= Venetian Arena =

Indoor arena in Macau

- 威尼斯人綜藝館; Arena Veneziana
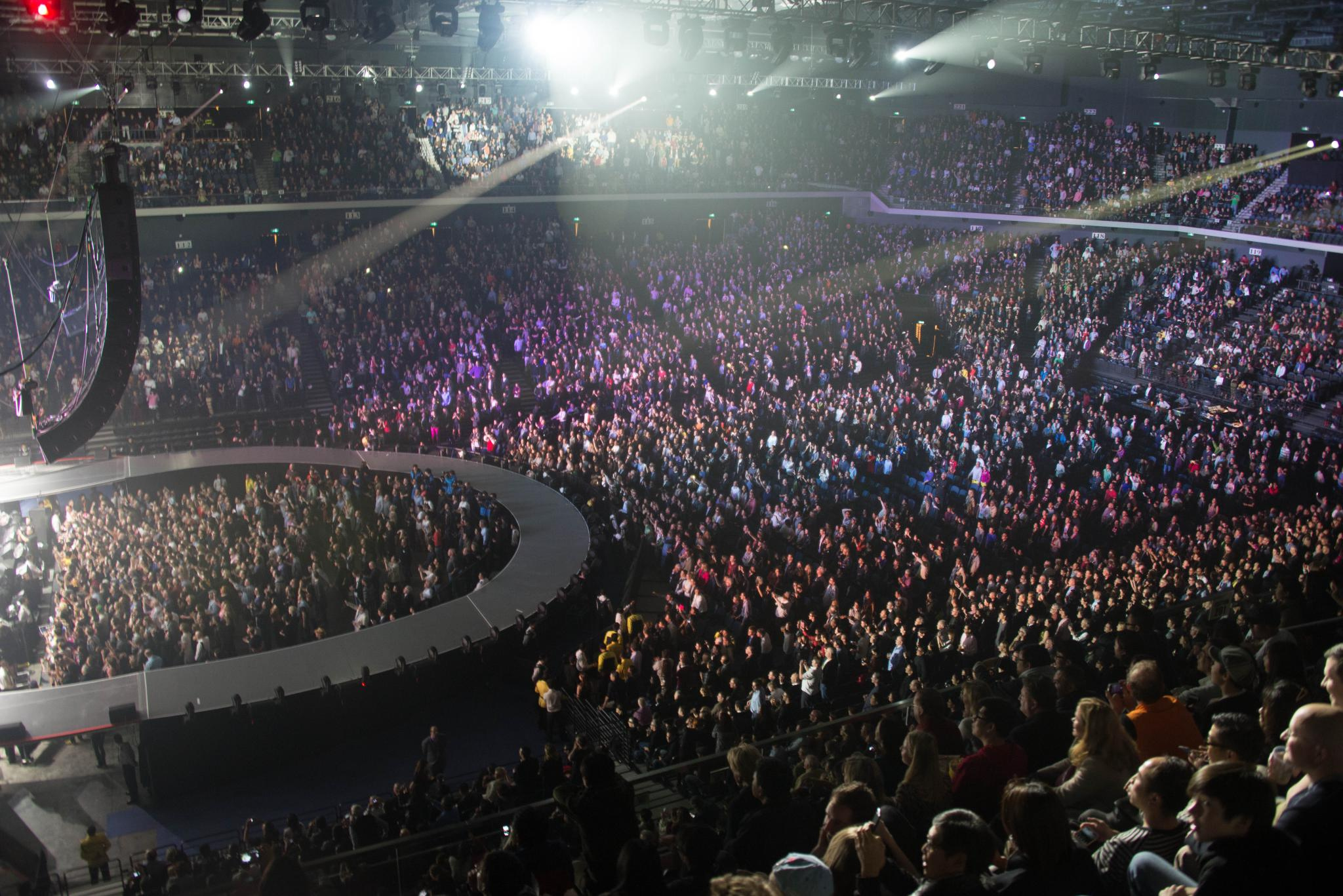
- Interactive map of Venetian Arena
- Full name: The Venetian Macao
- Former names: Cotai Arena (2010–2024)
- Location: Cotai, das Ilhas, Macau, China
- Coordinates: 22.1477°N 113.5590°E
- Owner: Las Vegas Sands
- Operator: Las Vegas Sands
- Capacity: 14,000

Construction
- Groundbreaking: 26 May 2005
- Opened: 28 August 2007

The Venetian Arena (previously known as the Cotai Arena) is an indoor arena located on the premises of The Venetian Macao, on the Cotai Strip, in Macau, China. It opened in 2007 and has a seating capacity of 14,000. The facility was known as Venetian Arena from 2007 to 2010, and was renamed the Cotai Arena from 2010 until 2024, when it reverted to its original name. It hosts sporting events such as basketball, tennis and boxing, as well as concerts and internationally televised awards shows.

== History ==
The arena opened as the Venetian Arena on 8 April 2007, and was renamed the Cotai Arena in 2010. In November 2024, the venue reopened with its original name, following renovations that added 15 VIP suites, enhanced acoustics, and advanced lighting systems.

== Notable events ==
- Annually: Miss Macau Beauty Pageant
- United States Basketball International Challenge: United States, Lithuania, Turkey
- The Amazing Race Australia – third leg
- 2007 Asian Indoor Games – closing ceremonies
- 20 October 2007: Cleveland Cavaliers vs Orlando Magic – NBA exhibition match
- 3 November 2007: The Beyoncé Experience by Beyoncé
- 26 January 2008: Ray Mercer vs Derric Rossy – heavyweight title flight
- 15 March 2008: Celine Dion – Taking Chances Tour
- November 2008: The Venetian Macao Tennis Showdown
- 15 August 2009: Lady Gaga – The Fame Ball Tour
- 25 October 2009: Andre Agassi vs Pete Sampras – exhibition tennis match
- 2009: IIFA Awards
- 2010 Mnet Asian Music Awards – South Korean music awards show, organised by Mnet Media
- 27 March 2010: – Fei Yu-ching
- 29 December 2011 to 1 January 2012: Cantopop Legend, 'God of Songs' Jacky Cheung held his 'Jacky Cheung 1/2 Century World Tour'.
- 2012: Zee Cine Awards – Indian cinema show and awards ceremony
- 9 and 10 March 2012: Super Show 4 World Tour by South Korean boy band Super Junior – These shows made the group the first Korean singers to perform two consecutive shows in Macau, with a sold-out total attendance of 26,756 people.
- 31 March 2012: Jam Hsiao World Tour 2012 – Taiwanese Mandopop singer Jam Hsiao
- 10 November 2012: UFC on Fuel TV: Franklin vs. Le
- 2013: IIFA Awards
- 13 and 14 September 2013: Rihanna (Barbadian singer) – Diamonds World Tour
- 12 October 2013: Believe Tour by Justin Bieber
- 23 November 2013: Welterweight Boxing bout between Manny Pacquiao and Brandon Ríos
- 30 November 2013: Super Show 5 World Tour by South Korean boy band Super Junior
- 15 February 2014: Girls' Generation – Girls' Generation World Tour Girls & Peace (South Korean girl group)
- 9 March 2014 : 50 & Counting Tour Asia Tour by The Rolling Stones
- 23 April 2014: 18th China Music Awards (CMA) by Star China Media, Ltd.
- 1, 2 and 3 May 2014: X.X.X. Live Tour concert by Hong Kong singer-songwriter G.E.M.
- 23 August 2014: UFC Fight Night: Bisping vs. Le
- 17 October 2014: All or Nothing World Tour by South Korean girl group 2NE1
- 22 November 2014: Welterweight Boxing bout between Manny Pacquiao and Chris Algieri
- 1 March 2015: Super Show 6 World Tour by South Korean boy band Super Junior, With a sold-out crowd of 14,750 fans, It is the second biggest audience at the Cotai Arena in a single concert after Super Show 7 World Tour in 2018.
- 1 and 2 May 2015: The Prismatic World Tour by American singer and songwriter Katy Perry.
- 23, 24 and 25 October 2015: sold-out concerts for Made World Tour by BIGBANG
- 21 November 2015: EXO PLANET #2 – The EXO’luXion – South Korean boy band EXO; a sold-out crowd of 13,108 people.
- 18 February 2017: Race Start! Season 4 – Running Man Fan Meeting 2017 by the members of Running Man, as the second Running Man fan-meeting of 2017.
- 25 March 2017: Asia Tour "The Rebirth Of J" in Macau, by South Korean singer Kim Jaejoong
- 17 and 18 June 2017: two sold-out shows for Act III: M.O.T.T.E World Tour by G-Dragon
- 4 November 2017: 2017 BTS Live Trilogy Episode III: The Wings Tour by BTS (band)
- 17 November 2017: Live performance by YouTube star performers V Minor.
- 12 May 2018: Super Show 7 World Tour by South Korean boy band Super Junior – the biggest audience on-record at the venue for a single concert, and the highest-grossing event in Cotai Arena history.
- 24 February 2018: Queen of Hearts World Tour concert by Hong Kong singer-songwriter G.E.M.
- 29 and 30 June 2018: Celine Dion Live 2018 – Céline Dion
- 10 and 11 August 2018: Exo Planet 4 - The EℓyXiOn – South Korean boyband Exo
- 11–20 August 2018: A Classic Tour – Hong Kong singer-songwriter Jacky Cheung
- 30 September 2018: Joker Xue – Skyscraper World Tour
- 20 October 2018: The Number 1's Tour by Mariah Carey
- 18 and 19 January 2019 : Fei Yu Qing Farewell Concert Encore Show – Taiwanese singer Fei Yu-ching
- 8 June 2019: In Your Area World Tour – South Korean girl group Blackpink
- 26 and 27 July 2019: The Twenty Tour by Westlife (Irish pop boyband) – first date sold-out seconds after being made available.
- 21 September 2019: Fei Yu Qing Farewell Concert Encore Show – Taiwanese singer Fei Yu-ching
- 13 October 2019: Shawn Mendes: The Tour – Shawn Mendes
- April 29–30, 2023: The Sun is Still Shining Wakin Together – Wakin Chau
- 9–30 June & 1–2 July 2023: Jacky Cheung 60+ Concert Tour – Hong Kong singer-songwriter Jacky Cheung
- 13 and 14 May 2023: The Dream Show 2: In A Dream – NCT Dream
- 30 September – 1 October 2023: This is MC 2 Live – MC
- 13–15, 26 October – 1 November 2023: Fear and Dreams World Tour – Eason Chan
- 25 and 26 November 2023: Pakho Chau 2023 World Tour – Pakho Chau
- 23 November 2024: 10th Anniversary Limited Tour – Zhang Bichen
- 14 December 2024: Something New Tour – Charlie Puth
- 22 and 23 February 2025: Welcome Back Tour – 2NE1
- 26 and 27 April 2025: The Tense – Taeyeon
- 27 April 2025: Kiss Road – Kiss of Life
- 27 and 28 September 2025: This Is For World Tour - Twice
- 10 and 12 October 2025: Brooklyn Nets vs Phoenix Suns – NBA exhibition matches
- 6 March 2026: Pulse On Tour – Treasure
- 15 August 2026: Tunnel Vision World Tour - ITZY

== See also ==
- Events and festivals in Macau
