= Robert Swedberg =

American opera stage director, arts administrator, and educator

Robert Swedberg is an American opera stage director, arts administrator, and educator. He was the general director of Orlando Opera from 1990 to 2007 and later served as director of opera and Clinical Associate Professor of music at the University of Michigan, retiring in 2018.

== Education ==
Swedberg received Bachelor of Arts and Bachelor of Music degrees from California State University, Northridge, in 1975, and earned a Master of Business Administration from the University of Central Florida in 1998.

== Career ==
==== Early opera work ====
After college, Swedberg performed with opera companies and touring ensembles in the western United States. In 1978, he joined Seattle Opera as an assistant director for Wagner's Ring cycle. His responsibilities subsequently included educational programs, stage management, and performing. He later served as manager and artistic director of Opera Carolina in Charlotte, North Carolina, and as general director of Syracuse Opera Company before joining Orlando Opera in 1990.

==== Orlando Opera, 1990-2007 ====
During his tenure at Orlando Opera, Swedberg produced or directed more than 80 opera productions, concerts, and recitals. His work included the development of the Heinz Rehfuss Singing Actor Awards and the company's Resident and Studio Artists programs.

His educational initiatives included a summer program in which children created and performed operas, the Heinz Rehfuss competition for young singers, and Pizza and Puccini, which brought high-school students to dress rehearsals.

Following the collapse of the Florida Symphony Orchestra in 1993, Swedberg helped the musicians establishing the Orlando Philharmonic Orchestra obtain office and storage space and supported their efforts to gain recognition within the community. He also hosted Opera with Robert Swedberg on WMFE-FM for more than 15 years.

In 2003, Swedberg incorporated Orlando Magic dancers and acrobats into a production of Carmina Burana. Orlando Sentinel reporter Wes Smith reported that every performance sold out.

In July 2006, Orlando Opera's board created the position of president and chief executive officer and appointed Jim Ireland. Swedberg's resignation was announced in April 2007. He described the departure as amicable and declined to discuss its circumstances publicly; contemporary reporting described surprise within the local arts community. In a subsequent report, board chairman Mitch Levin said that the company's financial problems were the board's responsibility.

Following Swedberg's departure, Ireland eliminated the general director position and assumed its responsibilities. Swedberg returned that November to direct Don Giovanni for the opening of the company's 50th-anniversary season. The production relocated the opera to New Orleans in the late eighteenth century.

==== University of Michigan, 2008-2018 ====
In 2008, Swedberg joined the University of Michigan School of Music, Theatre, and Dance as clinical associate professor of music and director of opera in the Department of Voice. His work included productions incorporating measures intended to reduce the environmental impact of rehearsals and performances.

He retired from active faculty service on September 1, 2018. The university's Board of Regents granted him the title of clinical associate professor emeritus of music that month.

==== International directing work ====
Swedberg's international engagements have included productions for the Macau and Beijing music festivals in China, the Calvia Music Festival in Mallorca, and the William Walton Music Foundation in Ischia, Italy. He has also directed at theatres in Hof, Bamberg, Pforzheim, and Bayreuth, Germany.

==== Yoga and teaching ====
Swedberg is a certified yoga instructor and wrote Yoga for Performers in 2005. His work has included workshops and yoga programs for performers.
