= Prismatic World Tour =

2014–2015 concert tour by Katy Perry

- Tour by Katy Perry
- Associated album: Prism
- Start date: May 7, 2014
- End date: October 18, 2015
- Legs: 6
- No. of shows: 151
- Supporting acts: Icona Pop; Capital Cities; Ferras; Kacey Musgraves; Teagan and Sara; Becky G; Betty Who; Tove Lo
- Box office: $204.3 million ($277.09 million in 2025 dollars)

Katy Perry concert chronology
- California Dreams Tour (2011–2012); Prismatic World Tour (2014–2015); Witness: The Tour (2017–2018)

The Prismatic World Tour was the third concert tour by American singer Katy Perry, in support of her fourth studio album, Prism (2013). The tour began on May 7, 2014, at Belfast, Northern Ireland's Odyssey Arena and ended on October 18, 2015, at Alajuela, Costa Rica's Parque Viva after six legs. The Prismatic World Tour grossed more than $204.3 million from 149 shows, with a total tour attendance of 1,984,503 between 2014 and 2015; the tour is Perry's most successful, to-date.

== Production ==
Perry first teased the tour during her We Can Survive event at the Hollywood Bowl on October 23, 2013, where she invited fans to come see her on a 2014 tour, stating that it would be "magical". In an interview with Entertainment Weekly, the singer stated that "The tour is going to be fantastic. I always try to take it to the next level. I think people will realize what the tour is going to be like when they listen to the music." She also emphasized that she would be "very close" to the audience during the tour. At the 2013 MTV Europe Music Awards, Perry said the show would be "less cartoony" than the California Dreams Tour and would be a "feast for your eyes". Perry told Capital in December 2013 that the tour would feature less of a storyline than her previous endeavors, saying:

I'm going to bring all the bells and whistles like it was last time but it won't be so highly narrated. I just want a little bit more room to express myself ... I'm just really excited. I just did a big tour meeting yesterday and saw the graphic drawing of the stage and it's unlike anything I've seen for any other artist and it's unlike anything I've ever done. It's different, it's fresh, it's clean and it's actually in the middle of the audience.

Over 275 costumes were designed for the tour, including 80 for the dancers. Perry gave designer Marina Toybina intricate details for each outfit's materials, patterns, and designs. According to Toybina, "[Perry's] creative involvement was daily, down to us deciding together on trims, final prints, specific materials and color spectrum for any and all digital artwork".

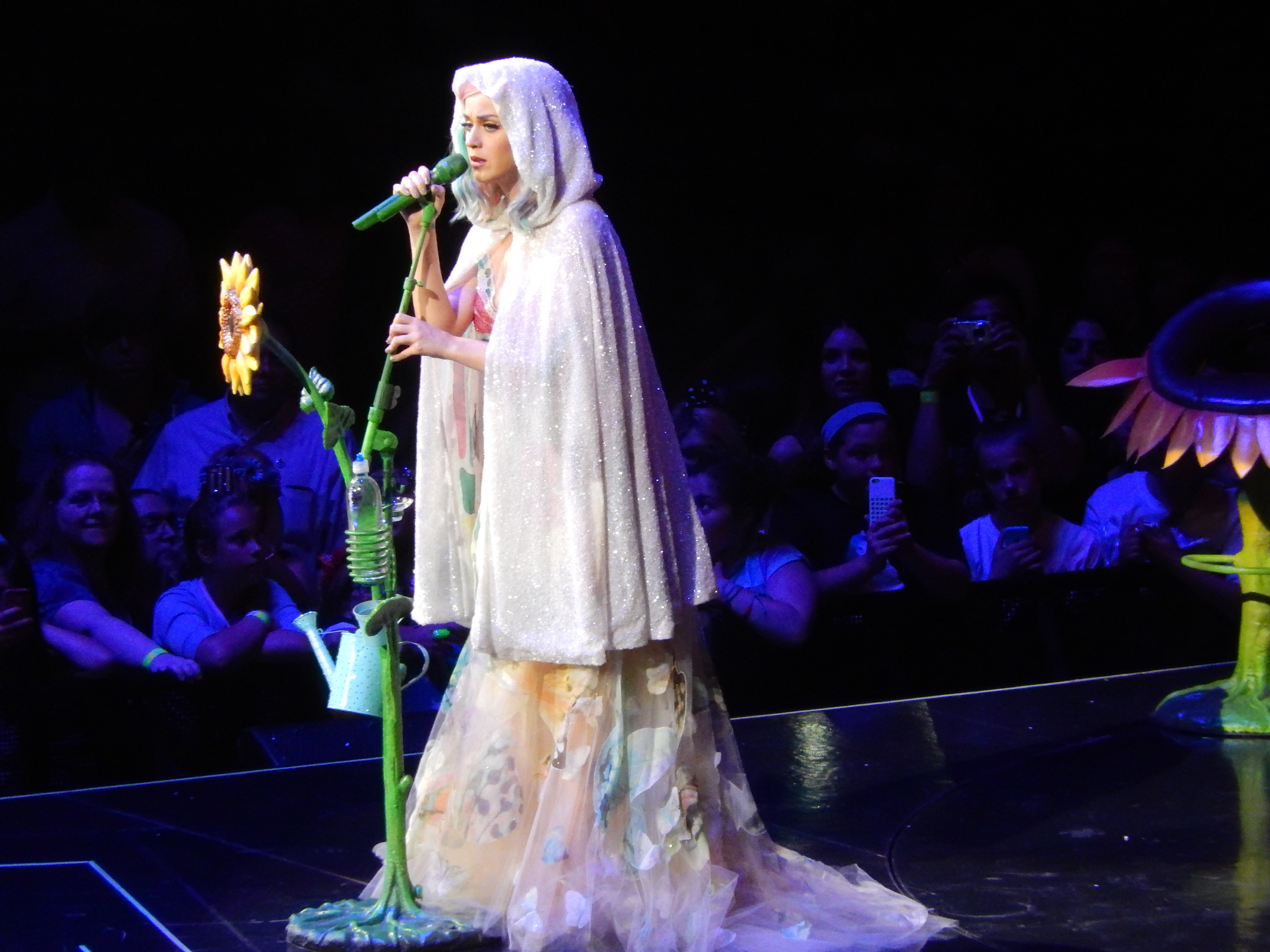
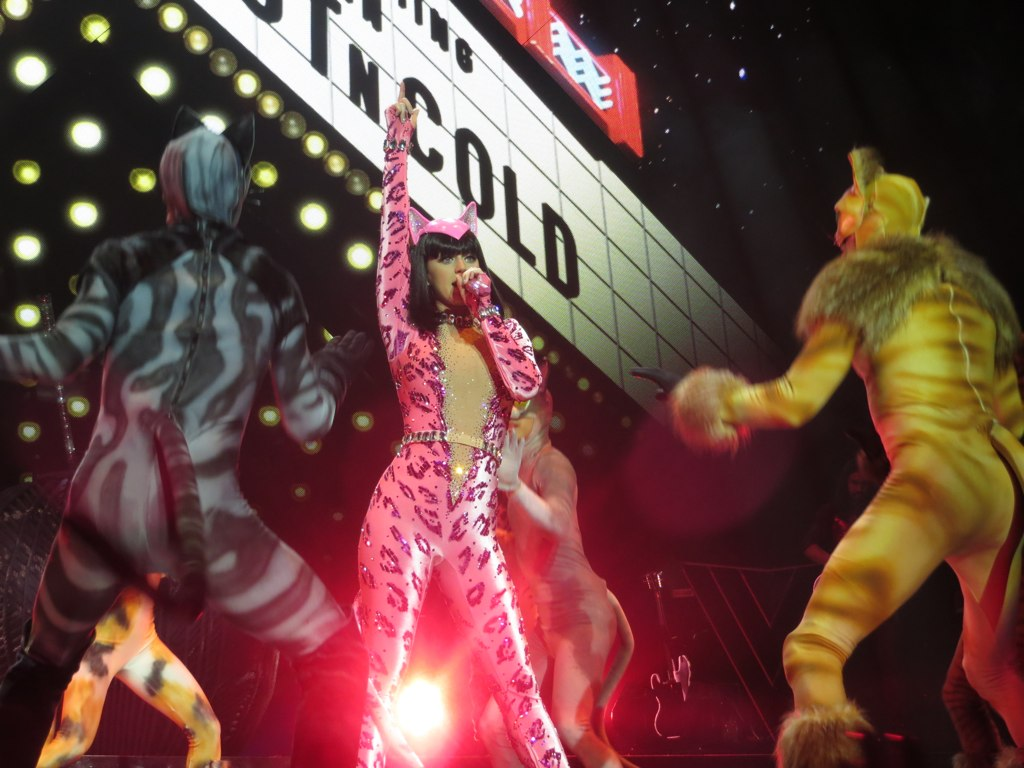
During the acoustic set of the tour, Perry was dressed in a butterfly-themed see-through dress with a sparkling cape with the stage props designed with sun flowers (left). While during the "Cat-Oure" section, Perry and her dancers were dressed as cats (right).

Perry announced the tour on November 18, 2013, via Twitter. She announced the first leg as taking place in Northern Ireland, Scotland, and England, with Icona Pop as the opening act. According to the official press release, the tour was designed to be a "multi-faceted spectacular" and would include a special standing area around the stage called "The Reflection Section" to allow Perry to be "closer than ever to her fans." The first leg commenced in May 2014. The North American second leg was announced on January 15, 2014, consisting of concerts in Canada, the United States and Mexico, from June to October 2014. Ferras opened for Perry on all of the North American dates, with the exception of Mexico. Capital Cities opened from June 22, 2014 through August 8, 2014, Kacey Musgraves opened from August 10, 2014 through September 10, 2014, duo Tegan and Sara opened from September 12, 2014 through October 8, 2014, and Mexican-American singer Becky G opened on the Mexican dates from October 10 through 18, 2014. The third leg, consisting of shows across Australia and Oceania, was announced in February 2014. Betty Who served as the opening act from November 7 through 28, 2014, while Tove Lo opened from November 30 until the end of the leg. The fourth leg was announced on June 2, 2014, and ran from February to March 2015 throughout Europe. Charli XCX opened these shows. The fifth leg of the tour, consisting of twelve shows, was announced on January 29, 2015, and toured eastern and southeastern Asia between April and May 2015. Ferras returned as the opening act in Taipei, Taiwan; The Dolls opened for Perry in China (Guangzhou, Macau and Shanghai) as well as Indonesia (Jakarta), Japan (Tokyo), the Philippines (Manila), Singapore and Thailand (Bangkok). The sixth and final leg of the tour, consisting of ten shows, was announced on March 7, 2015, and took place in Latin America between September and October 2015. Tinashe served as this leg’s opening act for shows in Argentina, Brazil (Curitiba), Chile (Santiago), Colombia (Bogotá), Costa Rica (Alajuel), Panama City, and San Juan, Puerto Rico. Other opening acts included Gala Brie (Lima, Peru), AlunaGeorge (São Paulo, Brazil), Argentine pop star Lali (Buenos Aires, Argentina), and Durazno (Bogotá, Colombia). On February 16, 2015, Rock in Rio announced Perry as their main headliner for the Rio de Janeiro festival.

=== Costumes ===
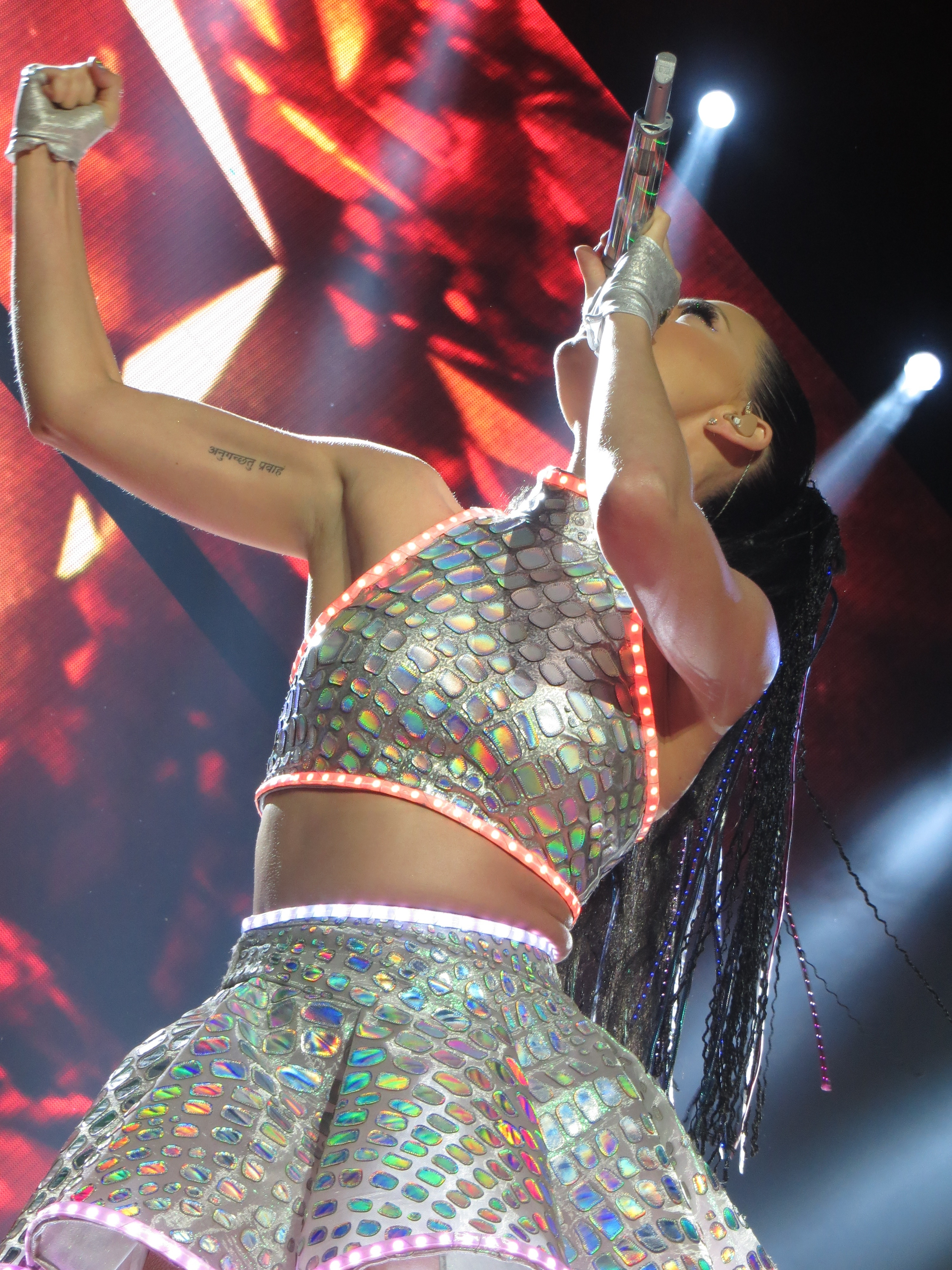
Perry performing "Roar" in a silver, mirrored leather skirt

Multiple outfits and costumes are featured throughout the tour. Her first costume, which is worn during the "Prismatic" act, is a silver, mirrored leather skirt, complete with fingerless gloves and matching heels. The neckline, waistline, arms, and bottom of the skirt all are installed with lights that glow during the performance. Perry also has light-up extensions to match her dress for this section. During the "Egyptian" act, Perry wears a hand-embroidered purple leotard, a hand-embellished collar and an ornate purple and gold skirt, complete with thigh-high purple high heel boots. She also wears a blonde wig with black bangs and ends. The "Cat-oure" act has Perry wearing a sparkly, pink, leopard leotard, complete with a tail and a matching pink plastic hat with cat ears and a short black bobbed wig attached to it. The chest and abdomen of the costume are nude colored, and the costume also contains a shimmery belt and collar. For the "Acoustic" act, Perry wears a butterfly-inspired dress, along with a short, silver glittery cape. The dress had a butterfly over the chest, and the bottom of the dress is see-through, also containing butterflies imprinted on it. She also adorns a multi-colored wig, featuring pastel blues, pinks, and greens. The "Throwback" act has Perry emerge on stage wearing a yellow smiley face push-up bra, leggings with yellow peace signs on them, as well as a yellow skirt. For "It Takes Two", Perry wears a Yin-Yang crop top over her smiley face bra and a large Yin-Yang dress that inflates as she rises on the stage. Following "It Takes Two", the Yin-Yang costume is removed and Perry now wears a yellow leather jacket with a smiley face on the back and sunglasses. The "Hyper Neon" act follows, where Perry wears a green palm tree-inspired bra, high waisted underwear containing palm tree decor around it, and pink heels with thigh-high socks on. After exiting and returning to perform "Birthday", Perry emerges wearing a full-body, skin-colored leotard. The leotard features many birthday-themed items on it, such as balloons over the breasts, a cake over her pubic region, a bow on the buttocks, confetti, and glitter everywhere, as well as 'Happy Birthday' embroidered on the back of it. During the entire "Hyper Neon" act, Perry wears a green ombre wig, that is dark towards the top, and transitions into a more lime green towards the tip. The wig is also pulled down into small buns. For the "Encore", Perry emerges with a long black wig and a firework-inspired dress. The corset and pants and heels are both glittery blue, and the corset features fireworks over the breasts. Perry adorns elbow-length blue gloves with fireworks on them. She also wears a dress that straps onto the corset and reveals the front of her body. The dress is orange and features many different fireworks around it.

=== Costume changes ===
On May 14, 2014, at LG Arena in Birmingham, England, the Egyptian-inspired Lavender bodysuit and thigh-high boots were replaced with a Red bodysuit & Gladiator sandals during the "Ancient Egyptian" Section of the show.

For the Asian Leg of the tour, Perry adorned several new costumes. For the "Prismatic" Act, she wore a metallic, purple cat-inspired leotard. The outfit contained metallic, purple thigh-high heel boots, a leotard complete with a cat face, glowing eyes, and little multi-color triangles around the leotard that lit up, similar to her previous outfit. For the "Acoustic" set, Perry now wears a sparkly green dress with sunflowers over the breasts and other parts of the dress. The wig she adorns is also more vibrant in color, and less pastel. For her shows in China, during the "Throwback" and "Hyper Neon" act, Perry wore a pastel splatter paint-inspired mini dress, which was a dress to look as if it had been splattered with paint. After her shows and China, Perry debuted (on tour) a new outfit to replace the splatter paint dress during the same act. This outfit consisted of a leather pink striped crop top bra, which had yellow shoulder pads sticking off of it. She wore leather pink striped cufflets and a pink, yellow and orange striped mini dress, created to look as if it was overlapping on itself – she wore this outfit when performing at the BBC Radio 1 Big Weekend.

== Concert synopsis ==
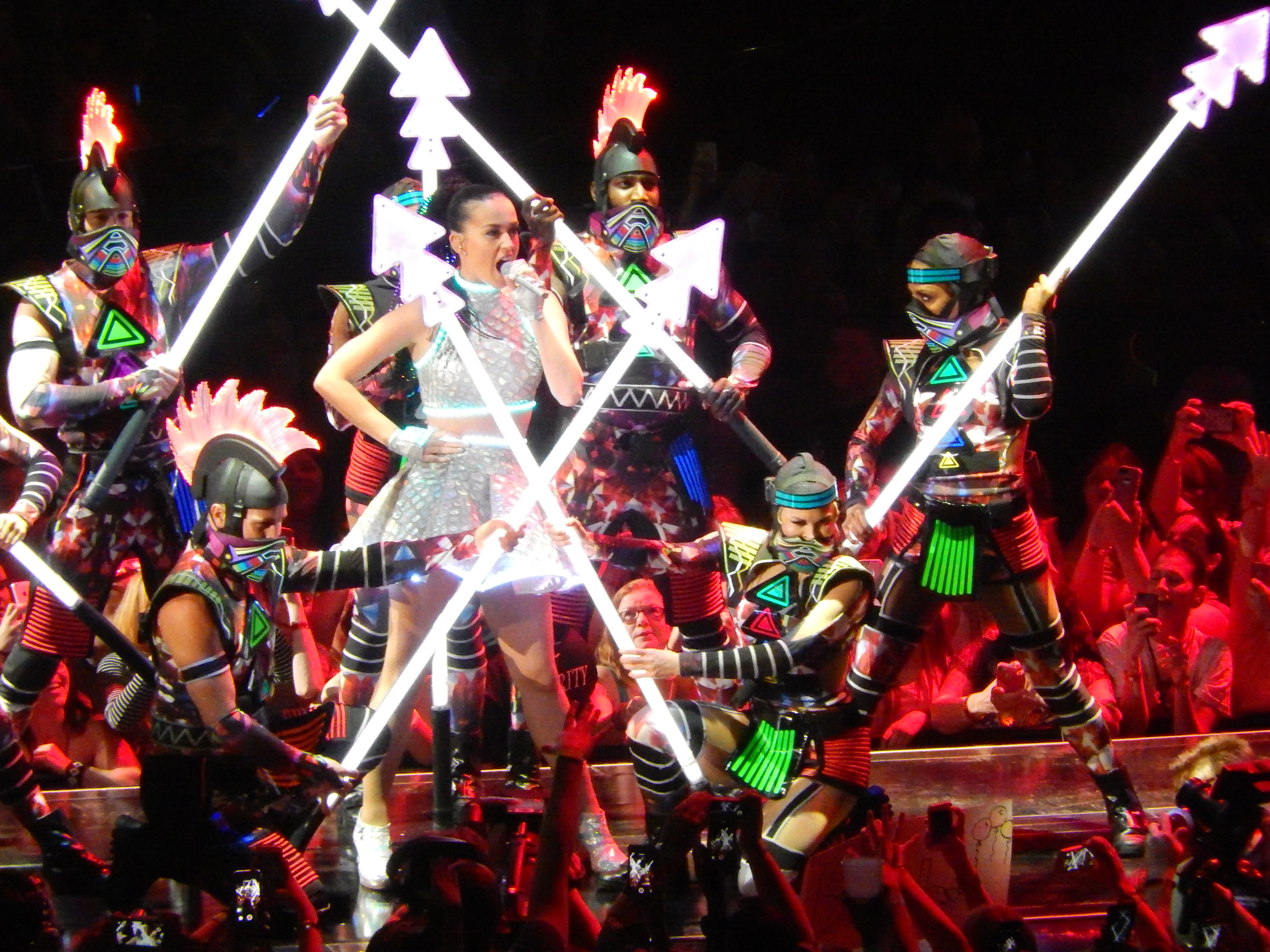
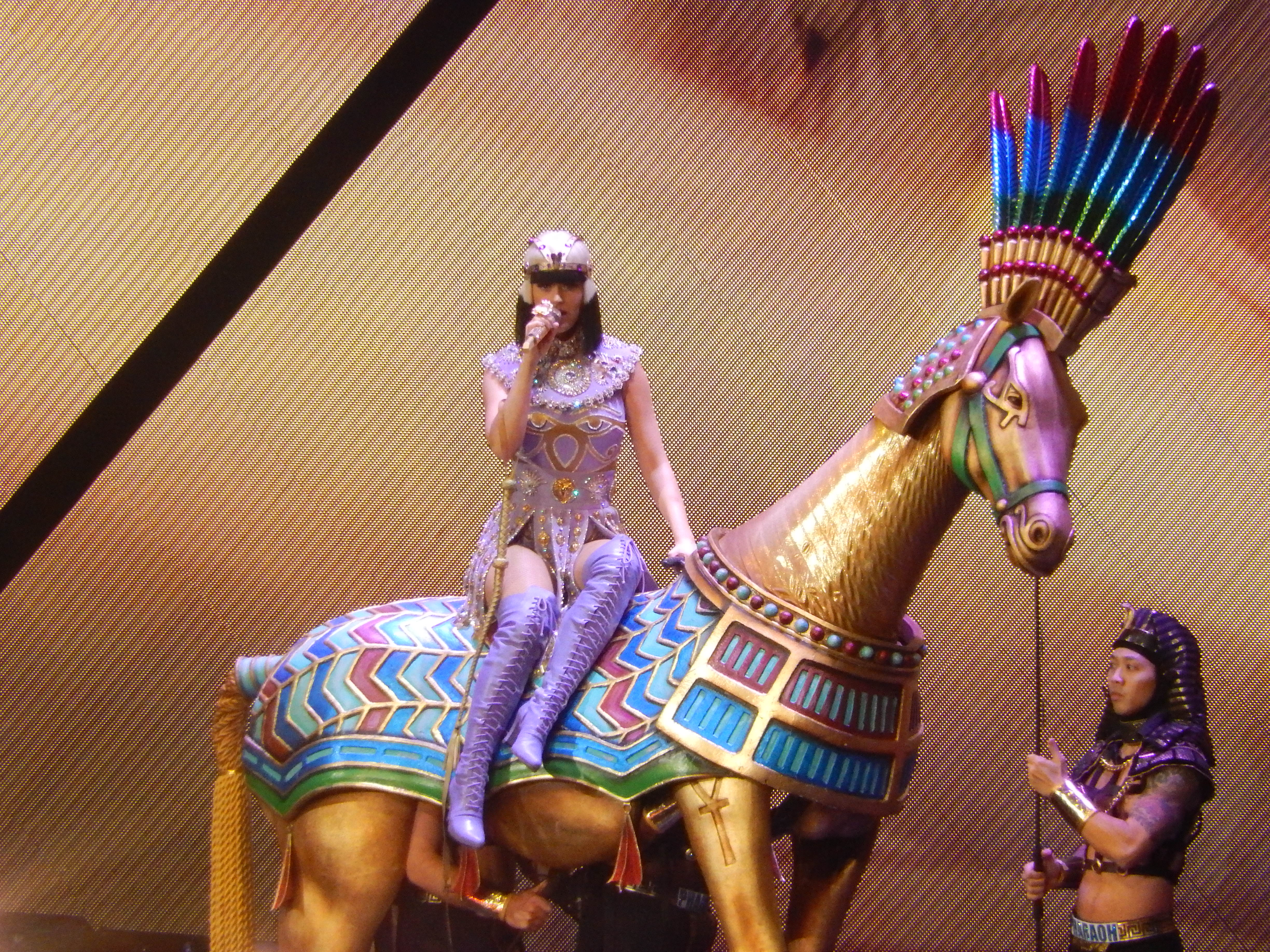
During the performance of "Part of Me", Perry was dressed in a mirrored-leather skirt with matching crop top with neon-clad dancers dressed in a similar way (left). while in the performance of "Dark Horse", Perry rose from the stage emerging on a golden horse carried below by her dancers (right).

The show begins with neon-clad dancers emerging on stage. An area of the stage moves to form a pyramid, from which Perry emerges to perform "Roar", wearing a mirrored leather skirt and crop top with neon lights woven into the seams. Towards the end of the song, she and the dancers skip using light-up ropes while the entire arena goes dark. "Part of Me" is the next track to be performed, where she and her dancers sprint down a 15-meter long treadmill. Following Part of Me, a dubstep version of "Wide Awake", during which a triangular section of the stage rises and rotates in the air. She then performs "This Moment", which features multi-colored lasers projected across the stage. This Moment shortly transforms into "Love Me" afterward, followed by Perry exiting the stage. After a video interlude displaying Perry's face created out of stars and planets in space, she appears on stage atop a mechanical horse. During this section of the tour, she wears an Egyptian-themed outfit, completed with a hand-embroidered leotard, a hand-embellished collar, and an ornate purple and gold skirt. Perry performs "Dark Horse", before moving on to "E.T.". A large diamond-shaped structure descends from the ceiling to lift the singer in the air. "Legendary Lovers" is then performed, followed by "I Kissed a Girl", which features dancers dressed as Rubenesque mummies with large breasts and buttocks. They follow Perry around the stage and after she exits, the mummies proceed with their own dance while guitarists are lifted into the air, with sparks shooting from their guitars.

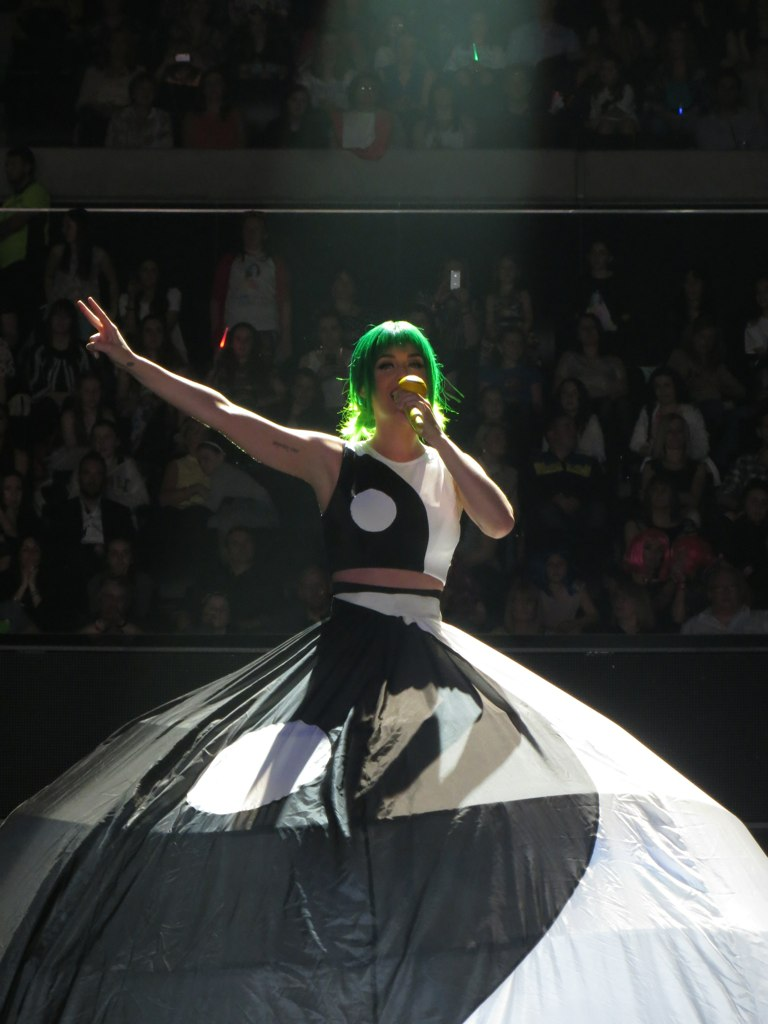
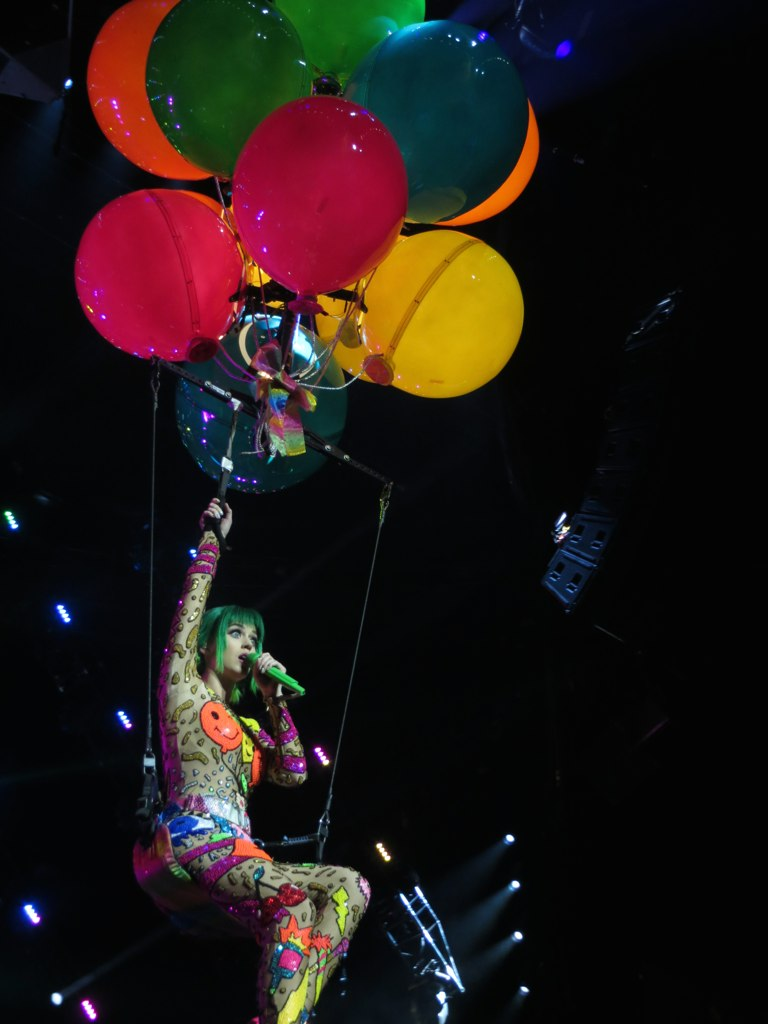
During the performance of "It Takes Two", Perry wore a ying-yang crop top with a matching huge skirt that rose from the center of the stage and rotated (left), while during "Birthday", Perry was lifted in the air while holding big balloons and flew all over the arena (right).

A video interlude shows a cat being transported from the Pyramids of Giza to "Kittywood". Perry emerges on top of a large ball of wool wearing a catsuit, accompanied by her dancers wearing similar cat costumes. A jazz version of "Hot n Cold" is then performed, before Perry begins to perform "International Smile"; the song is intermingled with Madonna's "Vogue". The dancers enact a short scene in which the cats chase a mouse. Perry re-enters, wearing a butterfly-themed dress and cape and performs multiple songs acoustically, including "By the Grace of God", a mash-up of "The One That Got Away" and "Thinking of You", and "Unconditionally".

At the beginning of this section, there is a "Megamix Dance Party", performed by the dancers and backing singers, which is a mix of a selection of songs. Perry arrives on stage wearing a top, skirt, and leggings featuring smiling faces and peace symbols. She performs "Walking on Air", where she is lifted above the stage and flies from one end to the other. Following this, she changes into a yin-yang dress to sing "It Takes Two". While performing the song, she is lifted off the ground while the bottom half of her dress is inflated and covers the lift, to give the apprentice of her being very tall. To close this section of the tour, a mash-up of "This Is How We Do" and "Last Friday Night (T.G.I.F.)" is performed as Perry and her dancers ride an inflatable car on stage. A video interlude is played, showing Perry as a mental patient in a triangular padded cell, before paint splashes from all room areas. She appears on stage wearing a bra and skirt decorated with palm leaves to perform "Teenage Dream". "California Gurls" is then performed with blackout lights and dancers move letters that eventually recreate the Hollywood Sign. Perry exits the stage before re-emerging to sing "Birthday", wearing a one-piece outfit named the "Birthday Suit", decorated with balloons over her breasts and other birthday-themed items. During the performance, Perry brings a member of the audience whose birthday is near the show's date on stage, and they sit on a throne on top of a rotating birthday cake, which emerges from the stage. She is soon trapped in a seat with multiple balloons attached and flies around the entire audience as balloons and confetti descend from above. Soon after, she exits the stage once more after thanking everyone for attending and introducing her dancers and band members.

For the encore, an interlude called "Prism-Vision" is played, where the audience is encouraged to wear special rainbow-star diffraction glasses picked up before the show to magnify the visual effects of the performance. Perry enters the stage wearing a firework-themed dress to perform "Firework". During the song's climax, multiple fireworks explode on stage before Perry ends the show, exiting through the pyramid from which she entered the stage at the beginning.

== Commercial performance ==
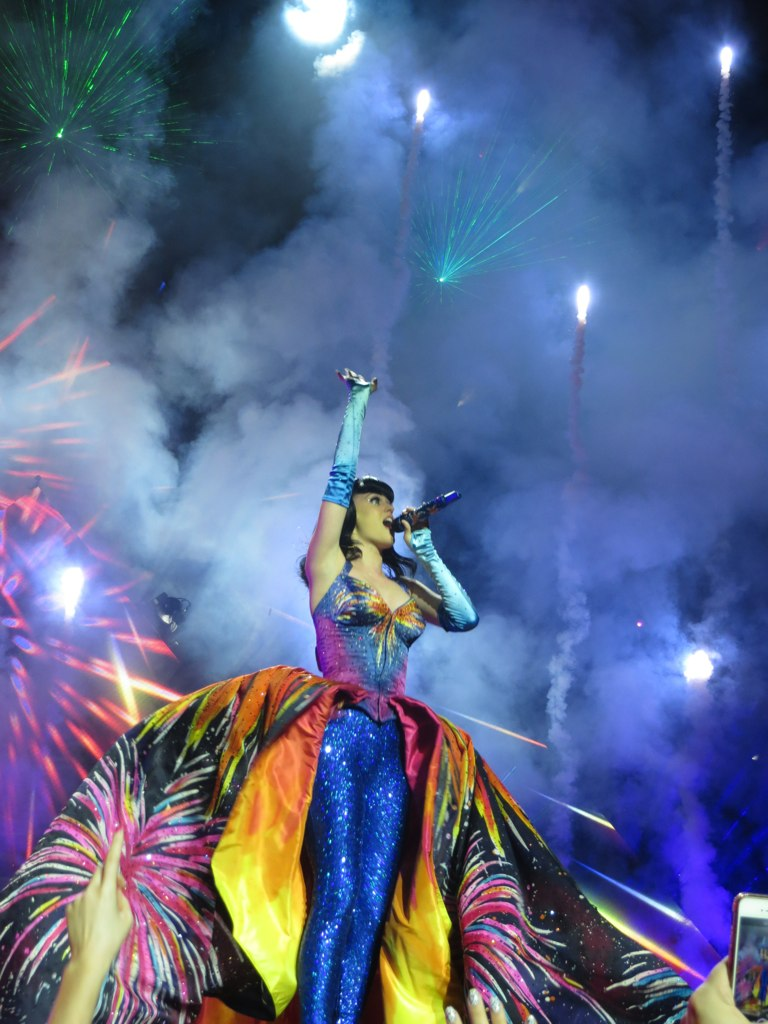
Perry closing the show with a performance of "Firework"

=== Ticket sales ===
The first leg attracted high public demand, resulting in additional shows in Belfast, Glasgow, and London being announced within hours of tickets being released on general sale. Soon after, Perry added extra dates in Manchester and Birmingham. Extra dates in the United States, Canada and Mexico were also added to the second leg of her tour shortly after the leg's first announcement. Due to vast popularity during the pre-sale period, Perry added more shows to the Oceania leg in Melbourne, Sydney, and Brisbane, extending the leg to December. Jesse Lawrence from Forbes reported on the North American leg of the tour, saying that her ticket sales averaged at $252.60 on the secondary market throughout the five-month stint in the country. His analysis concluded that the average price was higher than that of her peers, such as Beyoncé and Lady Gaga, adding "with Prismatic holding one of the highest tour average prices of the summer, the secondary market won't have many dates dropping below a $200 average price."

On Pollstar's Mid Year Top 100 Worldwide Tours list, released in July 2014 and ranking tours up until that date, the Prismatic World Tour ranked at number 26 with $22 million in grosses and 249,716 tickets sold for 22 shows so far. The Prismatic World Tour topped the Billboard Hot Tours weekly recap the week of September 18. The tour topped the chart with $31 million in ticket sales from 21 of the tour's North American concerts that occurred in a two-month span beginning on July 15. In Australia, the tour sold more than 350,000 tickets across 23 dates. It broke the record for most tickets sold at the Allphones Arena, selling a total of 89,500 tickets spanning six shows. Paul Dainty of Dainty Group, the promoters of the Australian leg, stated that ticket demand was so high "we could have added another dozen shows everywhere easily."

=== Boxscore ===
The Prismatic World Tour was an international success and became Perry's most successful tour to date. The tour was the second highest-grossing, and highest-grossing led by a female, in North America by average box office gross per city in 2014. According to Pollstar, the tour was the fourth best-selling in the world, and the best-selling by a solo female, in 2014 with a gross of $153 million and 1,407,972 attendees. The tour was highly successful in North America, becoming the 25th best-selling North American tour of all-time with sales of $94.3 million, making it the third best-selling tour in North America of 2014. The tour was also highly successful in Australia, selling 350,000 tickets across the country and breaking Allphones Arena's attendance record with over 89,000 tickets sold at Allphones Arena alone. The tour's success continued into 2015. The Pollstar 2015 Mid-Year Top 100 Worldwide Tour list revealed the Prismatic World Tour as the 23rd highest grosser, with a total of $25.8 million from 35 shows, and a total of 373,133 in attendance. However, Pollstar later adjusted its Mid-Year report, stating that the Prismatic World Tour grossed $35.7 million from 35 international dates in the first half of 2015 instead of $25.8 million. In the other hand, one week later, Billboard reported that the Prismatic World Tour grossed over $41.7 million from 27 shows in the first half of 2015. At the end of 2015, the tour placed 27th on Pollstar's "Top 100 Worldwide Tours", grossing $51 million from 43 dates.

Perry's performances at Melbourne's Rod Laver Arena ranked at number 11 on Pollstar's 2014 Top Year End International Boxoffice list. At the 2014 Billboard Touring Awards, the tour won the award for "Top Package" and was nominated for the "Concert Marketing & Promotion" award. Perry was the seventh most-searched artist on Ticketmaster in 2014.

== Critical reception ==
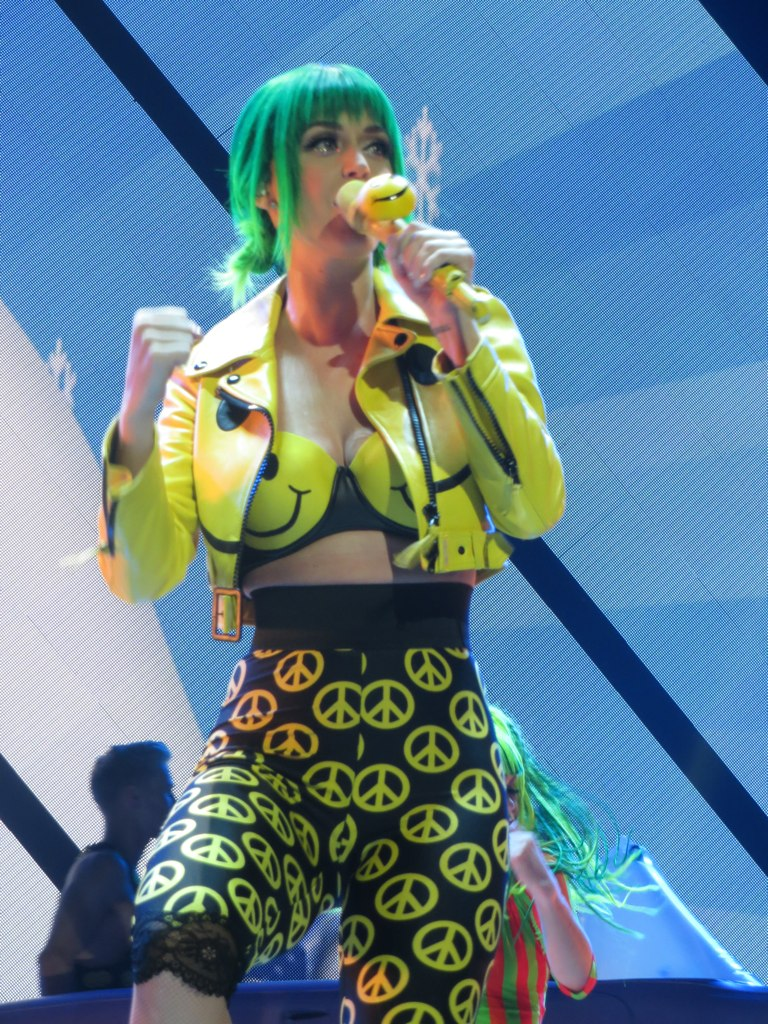
Perry performing "This Is How We Do"

The tour was largely well-received by critics. Colin Stutz, of Billboard magazine, called the performance in Belfast a "spectacle of costumes and colors". Julian Douglas, from The Irish Times, wrote that Perry "entertained, thrilled, and serenaded" and "oozed professionalism" despite feeling "under the weather". Emilee Lindner from MTV News felt Perry lived up to her previous "promise" of making the concert a "feast for your eyes and for your Instagram", and noted a recurring cat-theme within the show. In a review for one of the Glasgow shows, Matthew Magee from The Daily Telegraph awarded the tour four out of five stars, stating that Perry "made the kind of natural connection with her Glasgow audience that her peers would die for." Richard Clayton of Financial Times gave the show an excellent review, awarding five out of five stars, and described it as "sonically stonking, visually spectacular and fun, fun, fun." Daisy Wyatt from The Independent criticized Perry's vocal ability and stage presence. She awarded the tour three out of five stars. Rolling Stone reviewer Mark Sutherland praised the tour, calling it "loud, garish, camp and never less than uproariously entertaining" and "a show to damage retinas and blow minds."

Jem Aswad of The Village Voice described the show at Madison Square Garden as "Better Than: Every other multimillion-dollar concert I've seen" and commented that "The Prismatic tour, for all its expense and atom-splitting technology, is above all else fun, smart and crowd-pleasing, and I'll take that over the self-serious bombast that usually accompanies shows of this scale any day of the week." Nate Chinen of The New York Times gave the same show a mixed review, saying that he felt the "music was subordinate to the spectacle", though described it as a "Spectacle of Pop Idol Proportions". Pitchfork Media's Lindsay Zoladz commented on one of the shows at New York City's Barclays Center: "I felt about this concert the way I feel about Katy Perry overall: She throws everything she's got at the wall, and every so often hits a bullseye." Three journalists from Pitchfork gave the show a mixed review. Jason Lipshutz of Billboard reviewed the same show positively, saying "the superstar is at the top of her game, and Prismatic's Brooklyn debut shone bright." August Brown from the Los Angeles Times gave the tour a generally positive review, commenting that the "show at the Honda Center proved that Perry's persona is a lasting one", but "the few stumbles came in the presentation." Consequence of Sound's Michael Roffman named Perry one of the Top Live Acts of 2014, saying that with the Prismatic World Tour, "similar to the late King and the still-truckin' Queen of Pop — Michael Jackson and Madonna, respectively — Perry creates an unforgettable event for her legions of fans."

=== Accolades ===
Year	Award	Category	Result	Ref.
2014	Teen Choice Awards	Choice Music: Choice Summer Tour	Nominated	
2014	Billboard Mid-Year Music Awards	Best Tour	Nominated	
2014	TEC Awards	Tour / Event Sound Production	Nominated	
2014	Billboard Touring Awards	Concert Marketing & Promotion Award	Nominated	
2014	Billboard Touring Awards	Top Package	Won	
2014	Capital Loves Awards	Best Live Show	Nominated	
2015	Pollstar Awards	Major Tour of the Year	Nominated	
2015	Pollstar Awards	Most Creative Stage Production	Won	

== Broadcasts and recordings ==
Perry's pre-recorded "Birthday" performance at the Newcastle Metro Radio Arena show was aired live during the 2014 Billboard Music Awards ceremony on May 18, 2014. On May 25, 2014 Perry headlined BBC Radio 1's Big Weekend, which was streamed live on the Radio 1 website. It was also broadcast live on BBC Three, BBC HD and BBC Radio 1. Highlights of the event were also broadcast on BBC Three and BBC HD during the week following the Big Weekend. A recorded live performance of "Legends Never Die" with Ferras at the Staples Center was uploaded to Ferras's official YouTube channel on October 11, 2014. Perry's performance during Rock In Rio on September 27, 2015, was broadcast live in Brazil on Multishow, Globo.com, and Gshow, and internationally was streamed live online on LiveXLive.com, AOL.com and AOL app.

It was announced that the final Sydney shows on December 12 and 13, 2014, would be filmed for a concert movie. Almost a year later, on November 23, 2015, it was broadcast on Network Seven. On March 28, 2015, Epix aired a two-hour concert special of the tour, as part of their "Free Preview Weekend". A short video interlude for "Peacock" was broadcast before Perry performed "Teenage Dream". During the exclusive Q&A with Epix, Perry confirmed that she would make a DVD of the tour. She also revealed that she would change a couple of things for the DVD. Netflix added the tour's concert movie to its streaming service on June 26, 2015. The tour's concert movie was released on DVD, Blu-ray and Digital Download on October 30, 2015. All formats also include 30 minutes of exclusive extras.

== Set list ==
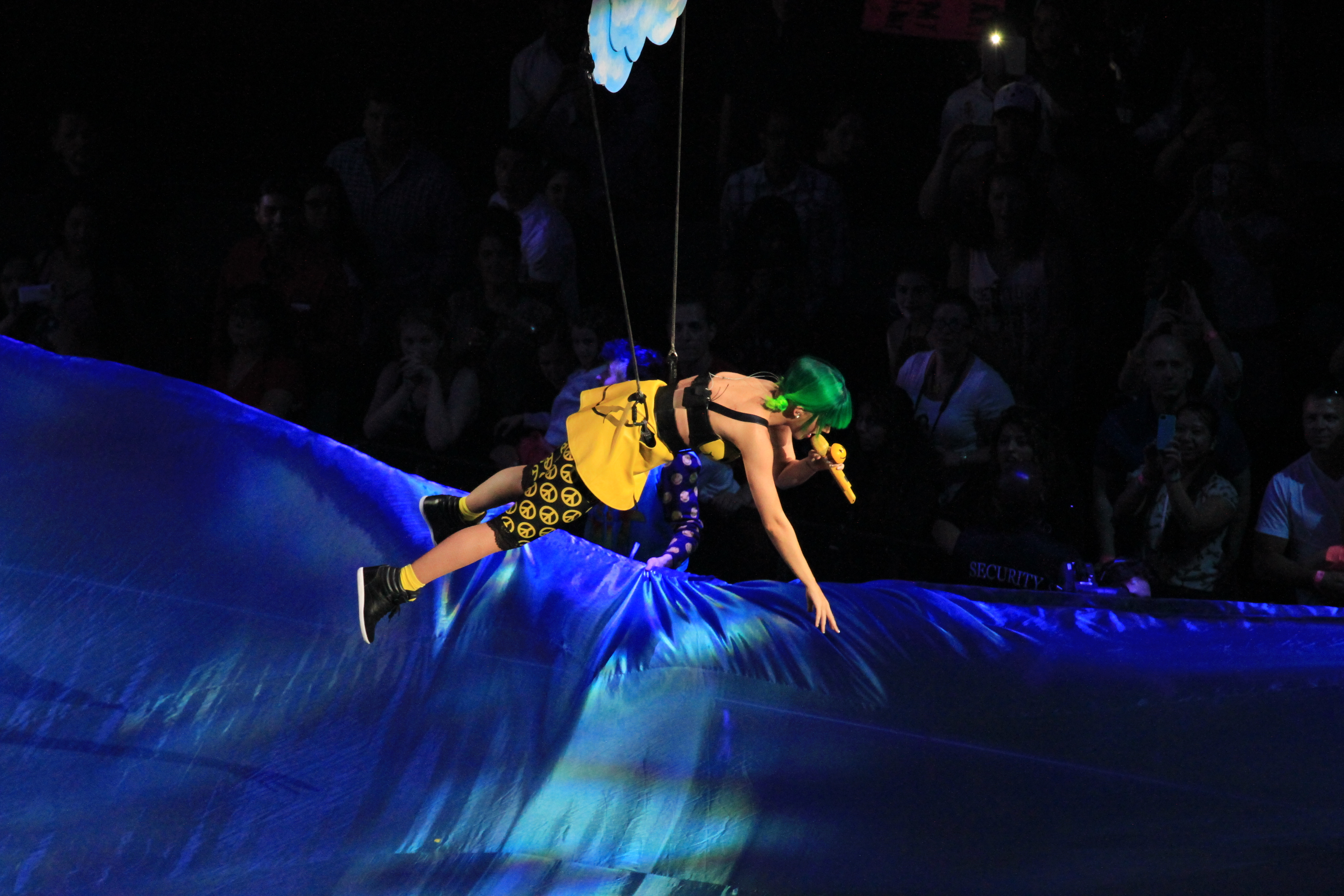
Perry performing "Walking on Air"

This set list is from the show on May 30, 2014 in London, England. It does not represent of all concerts for the duration of the tour.

1. "Roar"
2. "Part of Me"
3. "Wide Awake"
4. "This Moment" / "Love Me"
5. "Dark Horse"
6. "E.T."
7. "Legendary Lovers"
8. "I Kissed a Girl"
9. "Hot n Cold"
10. "International Smile" / "Vogue"
11. "By the Grace of God"
12. "The One That Got Away" / "Thinking of You"
13. "Unconditionally"
14. "Walking on Air"
15. "It Takes Two"
16. "This Is How We Do" / "Last Friday Night (T.G.I.F.)"
17. "Teenage Dream"
18. "California Gurls"
19. "Birthday"

Encore

20. "Firework"

Notes

- At selected dates in Europe, Perry performed "Double Rainbow" before "Unconditionally".
- At selected dates, such as on July 24 and 25 in Brooklyn and on April 28 in Taipei, Ferras joined Perry onstage in order to sing "Legends Never Die".

== Shows ==
List of 2014 concerts, showing date, city, country, venue, opening act, tickets sold, number of available tickets and amount of gross revenue
Date	City	Country	Venue	Opening act	Attendance	Revenue
May 7, 2014	Belfast	Northern Ireland	Odyssey Arena	Icona Pop	18,553 / 18,553	$1,658,690
May 8, 2014	Belfast	Northern Ireland	Odyssey Arena	Icona Pop	18,553 / 18,553	$1,658,690
May 10, 2014	Newcastle	England	Metro Radio Arena	Icona Pop	—N/a	—N/a
May 11, 2014	Nottingham	England	Capital FM Arena	Icona Pop	—N/a	—N/a
May 13, 2014	Birmingham	England	LG Arena	Icona Pop	—N/a	—N/a
May 14, 2014	Birmingham	England	LG Arena	Icona Pop	—N/a	—N/a
May 17, 2014	Glasgow	Scotland	The SSE Hydro	Icona Pop	—N/a	—N/a
May 18, 2014	Glasgow	Scotland	The SSE Hydro	Icona Pop	—N/a	—N/a
May 20, 2014	Manchester	England	Phones 4u Arena	Icona Pop	21,343 / 24,951 (Note: The score data is combined from the shows held at the Phones 4u Arena from May 20 and 24, 2014, respectively.)	$1,796,590
May 21, 2014	Liverpool	England	Echo Arena	Icona Pop	—N/a	—N/a
May 23, 2014	Sheffield	England	Motorpoint Arena	Icona Pop	—N/a	—N/a
May 24, 2014	Manchester	England	Phones 4u Arena	Icona Pop		
May 25, 2014 (Note: The concert of May 25, 2014, in Glasgow, Scotland is a part of Radio 1's Big Weekend.)	Glasgow	Scotland	Glasgow Green	—N/a	—N/a	—N/a
May 27, 2014	London	England	The O_{2} Arena	Icona Pop	53,871 / 63,574	$5,023,470
May 28, 2014	London	England	The O_{2} Arena	Icona Pop	53,871 / 63,574	$5,023,470
May 30, 2014	London	England	The O_{2} Arena	Icona Pop	53,871 / 63,574	$5,023,470
May 31, 2014	London	England	The O_{2} Arena	Icona Pop	53,871 / 63,574	$5,023,470
June 22, 2014	Raleigh	United States	PNC Arena	Capital Cities; Ferras	13,704 / 13,704	$1,461,008
June 24, 2014	Washington, D.C.	United States	Verizon Center	Capital Cities; Ferras	26,508 / 26,508	$3,293,503
June 25, 2014	Washington, D.C.	United States	Verizon Center	Capital Cities; Ferras	26,508 / 26,508	$3,293,503
June 27, 2014	Nashville	United States	Bridgestone Arena	Capital Cities; Ferras	13,487 / 13,487	$1,567,175
June 28, 2014	Atlanta	United States	Philips Arena	Capital Cities; Ferras	12,843 / 12,843	$1,525,349
June 30, 2014	Tampa	United States	Tampa Bay Times Forum	Capital Cities; Ferras	13,680 / 13,680	$1,503,644
July 2, 2014	Sunrise	United States	BB&T Center	Capital Cities; Ferras	12,888 / 12,888	$1,382,655
July 3, 2014	Miami	United States	American Airlines Arena	Capital Cities; Ferras	13,543 / 13,543	$1,432,275
July 7, 2014	Uncasville	United States	Mohegan Sun Arena	Capital Cities; Ferras	6,286 / 6,541	$941,786
July 9, 2014	New York City	United States	Madison Square Garden	Capital Cities; Ferras	13,846 / 13,846	$2,047,284
July 11, 2014	Newark	United States	Prudential Center	Capital Cities; Ferras	25,584 / 25,584	$3,363,432
July 12, 2014	Newark	United States	Prudential Center	Capital Cities; Ferras	25,584 / 25,584	$3,363,432
July 15, 2014	Montreal	Canada	Bell Centre	Capital Cities; Ferras	14,284 / 14,284	$1,332,540
July 16, 2014	Ottawa	Canada	Canadian Tire Centre	Capital Cities; Ferras	13,260 / 13,260	$1,053,260
July 18, 2014	Toronto	Canada	Air Canada Centre	Capital Cities; Ferras	44,556 / 44,556	$4,403,610
July 19, 2014	Toronto	Canada	Air Canada Centre	Capital Cities; Ferras	44,556 / 44,556	$4,403,610
July 21, 2014	Toronto	Canada	Air Canada Centre	Capital Cities; Ferras	44,556 / 44,556	$4,403,610
July 22, 2014	Pittsburgh	United States	Consol Energy Center	Capital Cities; Ferras	13,909 / 13,909	$1,440,835
July 24, 2014	Brooklyn	United States	Barclays Center	Capital Cities; Ferras	27,823 / 27,823	$3,280,455
July 25, 2014	Brooklyn	United States	Barclays Center	Capital Cities; Ferras	27,823 / 27,823	$3,280,455
August 1, 2014	Boston	United States	TD Garden	Capital Cities; Ferras	26,227 / 26,227	$3,178,415
August 2, 2014	Boston	United States	TD Garden	Capital Cities; Ferras	26,227 / 26,227	$3,178,415
August 4, 2014	Philadelphia	United States	Wells Fargo Center	Capital Cities; Ferras	28,213 / 28,213	$2,952,334
August 5, 2014	Philadelphia	United States	Wells Fargo Center	Capital Cities; Ferras	28,213 / 28,213	$2,952,334
August 7, 2014	Chicago	United States	United Center	Capital Cities; Ferras	27,851 / 27,851	$3,369,142
August 8, 2014	Chicago	United States	United Center	Capital Cities; Ferras	27,851 / 27,851	$3,369,142
August 10, 2014	Grand Rapids	United States	Van Andel Arena	Kacey Musgraves; Ferras	10,286 / 10,286	$787,474
August 11, 2014	Auburn Hills	United States	The Palace of Auburn Hills	Kacey Musgraves; Ferras	13,888 / 13,888	$1,363,889
August 13, 2014	Columbus	United States	Nationwide Arena	Kacey Musgraves; Ferras	14,138 / 14,138	$1,391,453
August 14, 2014	Cleveland	United States	Quicken Loans Arena	Kacey Musgraves; Ferras	15,376 / 15,376	$1,336,244
August 16, 2014	Louisville	United States	KFC Yum! Center	Kacey Musgraves; Ferras	16,306 / 16,306	$1,607,190
August 17, 2014	St. Louis	United States	Scottrade Center	Kacey Musgraves; Ferras	14,395 / 14,395	$1,463,826
August 19, 2014	Kansas City	United States	Sprint Center	Kacey Musgraves; Ferras	13,132 / 13,132	$1,219,456
August 20, 2014	Lincoln	United States	Pinnacle Bank Arena	Kacey Musgraves; Ferras	13,693 / 13,693	$1,217,100
August 22, 2014	Minneapolis	United States	Target Center	Kacey Musgraves; Ferras	13,718 / 13,718	$1,357,694
August 23, 2014	Fargo	United States	Fargodome	Kacey Musgraves; Ferras	21,843 / 21,843	$1,660,459
August 26, 2014	Winnipeg	Canada	MTS Centre	Kacey Musgraves; Ferras	11,858 / 11,858	$956,695
August 28, 2014	Saskatoon	Canada	Credit Union Centre	Kacey Musgraves; Ferras	12,379 / 12,379	$940,310
August 29, 2014	Calgary	Canada	Scotiabank Saddledome	Kacey Musgraves; Ferras	12,295 / 12,295	$1,239,040
August 31, 2014	Edmonton	Canada	Rexall Place	Kacey Musgraves; Ferras	25,112 / 25,112	$2,161,810
September 1, 2014	Edmonton	Canada	Rexall Place	Kacey Musgraves; Ferras	25,112 / 25,112	$2,161,810
September 9, 2014	Vancouver	Canada	Rogers Arena	Kacey Musgraves; Ferras	27,462 / 27,462	$2,680,950
September 10, 2014	Vancouver	Canada	Rogers Arena	Kacey Musgraves; Ferras	27,462 / 27,462	$2,680,950
September 12, 2014	Portland	United States	Moda Center	Tegan and Sara; Ferras	13,675 / 13,675	$1,137,015
September 13, 2014	Tacoma	United States	Tacoma Dome	Tegan and Sara; Ferras	19,902 / 19,902	$1,764,933
September 16, 2014	Anaheim	United States	Honda Center	Tegan and Sara; Ferras	23,374 / 23,374	$2,619,670
September 17, 2014	Anaheim	United States	Honda Center	Tegan and Sara; Ferras	23,374 / 23,374	$2,619,670
September 19, 2014	Los Angeles	United States	Staples Center	Tegan and Sara; Ferras	28,791 / 28,791	$3,606,823
September 20, 2014	Los Angeles	United States	Staples Center	Tegan and Sara; Ferras	28,791 / 28,791	$3,606,823
September 22, 2014	San Jose	United States	SAP Center	Tegan and Sara; Ferras	25,173 / 25,173	$2,963,031
September 23, 2014	San Jose	United States	SAP Center	Tegan and Sara; Ferras	25,173 / 25,173	$2,963,031
September 25, 2014	Glendale	United States	Gila River Arena	Tegan and Sara; Ferras	13,145 / 13,145	$1,423,994
September 26, 2014	Paradise	United States	MGM Grand Garden Arena	Tegan and Sara; Ferras	12,886 / 12,886	$1,742,965
September 29, 2014	Salt Lake City	United States	EnergySolutions Arena	Tegan and Sara; Ferras	13,860 / 13,860	$1,218,622
September 30, 2014	Denver	United States	Pepsi Center	Tegan and Sara; Ferras	12,784 / 12,784	$1,283,904
October 2, 2014	Dallas	United States	American Airlines Center	Tegan and Sara; Ferras	27,453 / 27,453	$3,520,503
October 3, 2014	Dallas	United States	American Airlines Center	Tegan and Sara; Ferras	27,453 / 27,453	$3,520,503
October 5, 2014	Memphis	United States	FedExForum	Tegan and Sara; Ferras	13,136 / 13,136	$1,177,517
October 6, 2014	Tulsa	United States	BOK Center	Tegan and Sara; Ferras	12,388 / 12,388	$1,285,851
October 8, 2014	New Orleans	United States	New Orleans Arena	Tegan and Sara; Ferras	13,718 / 13,718	$1,274,571
October 10, 2014	Houston	United States	Toyota Center	Becky G Ferras	24,268 / 24,268	$2,692,788
October 11, 2014	Houston	United States	Toyota Center	Becky G Ferras	24,268 / 24,268	$2,692,788
October 14, 2014	Monterrey	Mexico	Monterrey Arena	Becky G	—N/a	—N/a
October 15, 2014	Monterrey	Mexico	Monterrey Arena	Becky G	—N/a	—N/a
October 17, 2014	Mexico City	Mexico	Palacio de los Deportes	Becky G	39,212 / 40,368	$3,726,052
October 18, 2014	Mexico City	Mexico	Palacio de los Deportes	Becky G	39,212 / 40,368	$3,726,052
November 7, 2014	Perth	Australia	Perth Arena	Betty Who	29,153 / 29,153	$3,822,000
November 8, 2014	Perth	Australia	Perth Arena	Betty Who	29,153 / 29,153	$3,822,000
November 11, 2014	Adelaide	Australia	Adelaide Entertainment Centre	Betty Who	18,426 / 18,426	$2,264,770
November 12, 2014	Adelaide	Australia	Adelaide Entertainment Centre	Betty Who	18,426 / 18,426	$2,264,770
November 14, 2014	Melbourne	Australia	Rod Laver Arena	Betty Who	100,923 / 100,923 (Note: The score data is representative of the eight shows at the Rod Laver Arena on November 14–15, 18–19, December 4, 6–7, and 10 respectively.)	$13,360,900
November 15, 2014	Melbourne	Australia	Rod Laver Arena	Betty Who	100,923 / 100,923	$13,360,900
November 18, 2014	Melbourne	Australia	Rod Laver Arena	Betty Who	100,923 / 100,923	$13,360,900
November 19, 2014	Melbourne	Australia	Rod Laver Arena	Betty Who	100,923 / 100,923	$13,360,900
November 21, 2014	Sydney	Australia	Allphones Arena	Betty Who	93,841 / 93,841 (Note: The score data is representative of the six shows at the Allphones Arena on November 21–22, 24–25, and December 12–13 respectively.)	$12,177,000
November 22, 2014	Sydney	Australia	Allphones Arena	Betty Who	93,841 / 93,841	$12,177,000
November 24, 2014	Sydney	Australia	Allphones Arena	Betty Who	93,841 / 93,841	$12,177,000
November 25, 2014	Sydney	Australia	Allphones Arena	Betty Who	93,841 / 93,841	$12,177,000
November 27, 2014	Brisbane	Australia	Brisbane Entertainment Centre	Betty Who	60,159 / 60,159 (Note: The score data is representative of the five shows at the Brisbane Entertainment Centre on November 27–28, 30, December 1 and 15 respectively.)	$7,350,110
November 28, 2014	Brisbane	Australia	Brisbane Entertainment Centre	Betty Who	60,159 / 60,159	$7,350,110
November 30, 2014	Brisbane	Australia	Brisbane Entertainment Centre	Tove Lo	60,159 / 60,159	$7,350,110
December 1, 2014	Brisbane	Australia	Brisbane Entertainment Centre	Tove Lo	60,159 / 60,159	$7,350,110
December 4, 2014	Melbourne	Australia	Rod Laver Arena	Tove Lo		
December 6, 2014	Melbourne	Australia	Rod Laver Arena	Tove Lo		
December 7, 2014	Melbourne	Australia	Rod Laver Arena	Tove Lo		
December 10, 2014	Melbourne	Australia	Rod Laver Arena	Tove Lo		
December 12, 2014	Sydney	Australia	Allphones Arena	Tove Lo		
December 13, 2014	Sydney	Australia	Allphones Arena	Tove Lo		
December 15, 2014	Brisbane	Australia	Brisbane Entertainment Centre	Tove Lo		
December 19, 2014	Auckland	New Zealand	Vector Arena	Tove Lo	24,157 / 24,157	$3,046,890
December 20, 2014	Auckland	New Zealand	Vector Arena	Tove Lo	24,157 / 24,157	$3,046,890

List of 2015 concerts, showing date, city, country, venue, opening act, tickets sold, number of available tickets and amount of gross revenue
Date	City	Country	Venue	Opening act	Attendance	Revenue
February 16, 2015	Barcelona	Spain	Palau Sant Jordi	Charli XCX	—N/a	—N/a
February 17, 2015	Montpellier	France	Park&Suites Arena	Charli XCX	—N/a	—N/a
February 20, 2015	Lyon	France	Halle Tony Garnier	Charli XCX	—N/a	—N/a
February 21, 2015	Milan	Italy	Mediolanum Forum	Charli XCX	—N/a	—N/a
February 23, 2015	Prague	Czechia	O_{2} Arena	Charli XCX	—N/a	—N/a
February 24, 2015	Kraków	Poland	Tauron Arena	Charli XCX	—N/a	—N/a
February 26, 2015	Vienna	Austria	Wiener Stadthalle	Charli XCX	—N/a	—N/a
February 27, 2015	Bratislava	Slovakia	Ondrej Nepela Arena	Charli XCX	—N/a	—N/a
March 1, 2015	Zürich	Switzerland	Hallenstadion	Charli XCX	13,000 / 13,000	$1,183,140
March 2, 2015	Munich	Germany	Olympiahalle	Charli XCX	—N/a	—N/a
March 4, 2015	Antwerp	Belgium	Sportpaleis	Charli XCX	18,396 / 19,920	$1,045,430
March 5, 2015	Cologne	Germany	Lanxess Arena	Charli XCX	—N/a	—N/a
March 7, 2015	Herning	Denmark	Jyske Bank Boxen	Charli XCX	—N/a	—N/a
March 9, 2015	Amsterdam	Netherlands	Ziggo Dome	Charli XCX	—N/a	—N/a
March 10, 2015	Amsterdam	Netherlands	Ziggo Dome	Charli XCX	—N/a	—N/a
March 12, 2015	Hamburg	Germany	O_{2} World Hamburg	Charli XCX	7,936 / 11,664	$537,228
March 13, 2015	Berlin	Germany	O_{2} World	Charli XCX	12,491 / 12,515	$753,185
March 15, 2015	Riga	Latvia	Arena Riga	Charli XCX	—N/a	—N/a
March 18, 2015	Helsinki	Finland	Hartwall Arena	Charli XCX	—N/a	—N/a
March 20, 2015	Oslo	Norway	Telenor Arena	Charli XCX	—N/a	—N/a
March 22, 2015	Stockholm	Sweden	Ericsson Globe	Charli XCX	—N/a	—N/a
April 18, 2015	Guangzhou	China	Guangzhou Sports Arena	The Dolls	—N/a	—N/a
April 21, 2015	Shanghai	China	Mercedes-Benz Arena	The Dolls	—N/a	—N/a
April 22, 2015	Shanghai	China	Mercedes-Benz Arena	The Dolls	—N/a	—N/a
April 25, 2015	Tokyo	Japan	Tokyo Metropolitan Gymnasium	The Dolls	—N/a	—N/a
April 26, 2015	Tokyo	Japan	Tokyo Metropolitan Gymnasium	The Dolls	—N/a	—N/a
April 28, 2015	Taipei	Taiwan	Taipei Arena	Ferras	—N/a	—N/a
May 1, 2015	Macau	China	Cotai Arena	The Dolls	—N/a	—N/a
May 2, 2015	Macau	China	Cotai Arena	The Dolls	—N/a	—N/a
May 7, 2015	Bocaue	Philippines	Philippine Arena	The Dolls	—N/a	—N/a
May 9, 2015	Tangerang	Indonesia	Indonesia Convention Exhibition	The Dolls	—N/a	—N/a
May 11, 2015	Singapore		Singapore Indoor Stadium	The Dolls	—N/a	—N/a
May 14, 2015	Bangkok	Thailand	Impact Arena	The Dolls	—N/a	—N/a
September 22, 2015	Lima	Peru	Hipódromo de Monterrico	Gala Brie	15,635 / 15,635	$1,397,180
September 25, 2015	São Paulo	Brazil	Allianz Parque	AlunaGeorge	35,564 / 35,564	$2,218,220
September 27, 2015 (Note: The concert of September 27, 2015, in Rio de Janeiro, Brazil is a part of Rock in Rio.)	Rio de Janeiro	Brazil	Parque dos Atletas	—N/a	—N/a	—N/a
September 29, 2015	Curitiba	Brazil	Pedreira Paulo Leminski	Tinashe	16,076 / 16,076	$1,115,000
October 3, 2015	Buenos Aires	Argentina	Hipódromo Argentino de Palermo	Tinashe; Lali	17,623 / 17,623	$1,745,600
October 6, 2015	Santiago	Chile	Explanada del Estadio Nacional	Tinashe; Consuelo Schuster	23,438 / 23,438	$1,955,240
October 9, 2015	Bogotá	Colombia	Parque Deportivo 222	Tinashe; Durazno	18,796 / 18,796	$1,409,520
October 12, 2015	San Juan	Puerto Rico	José Miguel Agrelot Coliseum	Tinashe	15,218 / 15,653	$1,691,275
October 15, 2015	Panama City	Panama	Plaza Figali	Tinashe	6,928 / 8,000	$968,479
October 18, 2015	Alajuela	Costa Rica	Parque Viva	Tinashe	16,199 / 16,199	$1,423,310
Total					1,515,864 / 1,537,369 (98.6%)	$160,293,758

== Personnel ==
=== Main ===
- Baz Halpin – director
- Harry Sandler – tour manager
- Cindy Chapman – assistant tour manager
- Jay Schmit – production manager
- Kim Hilton – production coordinator
- Kavi Agrawal – production coordinator
- Bradford Cobb – tour producers
- Steven Jensen – tour producers
- Martin Kirkup – tour producers
- Ngoc Hoang – tour producers
- Alan Doyle – stage manager
- John Czajkowski – tour accountant
- David Mendoza – set construction
- Michael Curry Designs – set construction
- Aaron Ford – set construction
- Patrick Seeley – set construction
- Tamra Natisin – personal assistant
- Armando Alarcon – personal trainer
- Greenberg Traurig – legal representative
- Jay Cooper – legal representative
- Steve Plinio – legal representative
- Bernie Gudvi – business manager
- Jeff Hinkle – business manager
- Sandy Cohen – business manager
- Emma Banks– booking agent
- Mitch Rose– booking agent
- Jbeau Lewis– booking agent
- Christian Carubi – booking agent
- Tina Walters – travel agent
- Debbie and Nancy Rosenblatt – travel agent
- Lyndsay Thomson – travel agent
- Tracy Lonsdale – travel agent
- RJ Durell – choreographer
- Nick Florez – choreographer
- Katie Schaar – assistant choreographer
- Todd Delano – hair and make-up
- Clyde Haygood – hair and make-up
- Larry McDaniel – hair and make-up
- Darren Scott – hair and make-up
- Erin Lareau – wardrobe
- Lisa Nishimura – wardrobe
- Laura Spratt – wardrobe
- Abby Franklin – wardrobe
- Marina Toybina – wardrobe
- Tony Villanueva – wardrobe supervisor
- Baz Halpin – production design
- Kathy Beer – lighting director
- John Chiodo – lighting crew chief
- Baz Halpin – lighting design
- Eric Marchwinski – lighting design
- Julian Lavender – lighting design
- John Huddleston – lighting design
- Bart Buckalew – lighting technology
- Tony Cerasuolo – lighting technology
- Chris Donati – lighting technology
- John Dall – lighting technology
- Jamie Catt – lighting technology
- Nick Barton – lighting technology
- Alex Murphy – lighting technology
- Tiffany Hudson – lighting technology
- Chuck Melton – head rigger
- Ricky Baiotto – riggers
- Albert Pozzetti – riggers
- Jake Harrelson – riggers
- Patrick Leonard – riggers
- Duane Burda – backline crew chief
- Dan Lefevre – head chef, catering crew chief
- Robert Moore – automation
- Richard Kent – automation
- Simon Parsons – automation
- Rick Berger – automation
- Michael Berger – automation
- Eric Pelletier – automation
- Luke Larson – carpenter
- Dewey Evans – carpenter
- Jimmy George – carpenter
- PJ Smith – carpenter
- Mike Ryder – carpenter
- Vadim Melline – carpenter
- Aaron Ford – carpenter
- Pete Keppler – engineer
- Eric Racy – engineer
- Manny Barajas – engineer
- Ben Rothstein – engineer
- Shaun Barnett – pyrotechnics and lasers
- Marc Webber – pyrotechnics and lasers
- Ryan Hagan – pyrotechnics and lasers
- Dan Ivory-Castle – pyrotechnics and lasers
- Ian MacDonald – pyrotechnics and lasers
- Michael Morey – pyrotechnics and lasers
- Alex Oita – pyrotechnics and lasers
- Lightborne – video design
- Ben Nicholson – video design
- JT Rooney – video design
- Todd LePere – video design
- Omar Montes-Rangel – video engineer, video director
- Eugene McAuliffe – video engineer
- Live Nation – promoter
- SJM Concerts – promoter
- AEG, OCESA / Zignia Live – promoter
- Dainty Group – promoter
- The Blonds – costume design
- Roberto Cavalli – costume design
- Discount Universe – costume design
- J&M Costumers – costume design
- Nicolas Jebran – costume design
- Alexis Mabille – costume design
- Marco Marco – costume design
- Fausto Puglisi – costume design
- Jeremy Scott – costume design
- Silvia's Costumers – costume design
- Straight-Laced @ Runway Archives & Showroom – costume design
- Todd Thomas – costume design
- Valentino – costume design
- Johnny Wujek – costume design
- LaDuca Shoes – costume design
- Leah Adler – dancer
- Khasan Brailsford – dancer
- Lockhart Brownlie – dancer
- Bryan Gaw – dancer
- Loriel Hennington – dancer
- Malik LeNost – dancer
- Scott Myrick – dancer
- Cassidy Noblett – dancer
- Tracy Shibata – dancer
- Britt Stewart – dancer

=== Band ===
- Kris Pooley – musical director
- Max Hart – keys
- Casey Hooper – guitar
- Nathan Spicer – guitar
- Adam Marcello – drums
- Joshua Moreau – bass
- Lauren Ball – background vocals
- Cherri Black – background vocals
- The Last Night – remixer
- Jack Rayner – remixer

Credits adapted from The Prismatic World Tour program.

== See also ==
- List of highest-grossing concert tours by women
