= The Venetian Macao Tennis Showdown =

The Venetian Macao Tennis Showdown, in 2007 was the grand finale of a three-leg Pete Sampras vs Roger Federer Asia exhibition match tour. The previous legs were in Seoul, Korea on November 20, Kuala Lumpur, Malaysia on November 22.

On November 20, Sampras lost the first of the three exhibition matches in Asia against Roger Federer losing 6–4, 6–3 in Seoul, Korea. Two days later in Kuala Lumpur (The Clash of Times), Sampras again lost to Federer, 7–6(6), 7–6(5). However, Sampras was able to win the last match of the series (The Venetian Macao Tennis Showdown), winning 7–6(6), 6–4.

Format Of The Venetian Macao Tennis Showdown 2007: (Saturday November 24, 2007)

- Venue: The Venetian Macao
- Surface: Gerflor Tennis Tournament
- Match: Pete Sampras Vs Roger Federer (Best Of 3 Tie-Break Sets)

== 2008 ==
John McEnroe, Björn Borg, Roger Federer and James Blake. Four champions across two eras faced off in this tennis spectacular. It was the second group of challenge matches held in Macao (on November 20), the first being the Showdown of Champions format held in Kuala Lumpur on 18 November.

Format Of The Venetian Macao Tennis Showdown 2008: (Thursday, November 20, 2008, Cotai Strip CotaiArena, Macao)

- Surface: Gerflor Taraflex ATP
- Match 1 (1 Set)

John McEnroe Vs Björn Borg

- Match 2 (Best Of 3 Tie-Break Sets)

Roger Federer Vs James Blake

- Match 3 (10 Point Doubles Tie-Breaker)

Björn Borg/Roger Federer Vs John McEnroe/James Blake

The final results were:

- Björn Borg def. John McEnroe, 7-6
- Roger Federer def. James Blake 6–4, 6-4
- John McEnroe/James Blake def. Björn Borg/Roger Federer 10–7 in a 10 Point Doubles Tie-Breaker
