= Part of Me (Katy Perry song) =

2012 song by Katy Perry

Single by Katy Perry

from the album Teenage Dream: The Complete Confection
- B-side: "Tommie Sunshine's Megasix Smash-Up"
- Written: 2010
- Released: February 13, 2012
- Studio: Conway (Hollywood, California); Playback (Santa Barbara, California)
- Genre: Dance-pop; power pop
- Length: 3:35
- Label: Capitol
- Songwriters: Katy Perry; Lukasz Gottwald; Max Martin; Bonnie McKee
- Producers: Dr. Luke; Max Martin; Cirkut

Katy Perry singles chronology
| "The One That Got Away" (2011) | "Part of Me" (2012) | "Wide Awake" (2012) |

Music video
- "Part of Me" on YouTube

"Part of Me" is a song by American singer-songwriter Katy Perry from Teenage Dream: The Complete Confection (2012), the reissue of her third studio album, Teenage Dream (2010). It was written by Perry, Dr. Luke, Max Martin, and Bonnie McKee, and produced by Dr. Luke, Martin, and Cirkut. The song was not included on the original edition of Teenage Dream because Perry felt that it did not fit the composition of the album. A demo of the song leaked online in late 2010, amid speculation that the lyrics were directed to the singer's ex-boyfriend Travie McCoy. "Part of Me" was re-worked and officially released as the lead single from The Complete Confection on February 13, 2012, through Capitol Records.

A dance-pop and power pop record with electropop elements and a distinctive house beat, it has been compared to Perry's 2010 singles "Firework" and "California Gurls". Its lyrics describe a female protagonist who declares herself as unbreakable and strong following a break-up. Many critics theorized that the lyrics addressed Perry's divorce from British comedian, media personality and actor Russell Brand, although she stated it was not about him, since it was written in early 2010. The single's artwork was produced by art director Gavin Taylor and photographer Mary Ellen Matthews.

"Part of Me" was a commercial success. It was the twentieth song to debut at number one on the Billboard Hot 100, Perry's seventh number-one single on the chart, and her ninth consecutive number-one single on the Billboard Hot Dance Club Songs chart. Outside of the United States, "Part of Me" topped the charts in Bulgaria, Canada, New Zealand, and the United Kingdom, and has been certified diamond in Brazil while receiving multi-platinum certifications in Australia, Canada, New Zealand, and the United States. Marketing campaigns for Adidas and The Sims 3: Showtime have featured it.

An accompanying music video was filmed at the United States Marine Corps' Camp Pendleton in Oceanside, California. The video depicts Perry enlisting in the Marines following a break-up. It garnered generally positive reviews for Perry's "Girl power" message but drew criticism from feminist author Naomi Wolf, who denounced it as military propaganda. Perry debuted the first televised performance of the song at the 54th Grammy Awards and has also performed the song at the ECHO Awards, the 2012 Kids' Choice Awards, and American Idol.

== Background and release ==
I wrote 'Part of Me' two years ago and I always knew that 'Part of Me' was a special song, It feels like my life plays out with these songs. I feel like I'm in some kind of weird 'Truman Show' where I'm like, 'Why is this single appropriate now and it wouldn't have been appropriate then?' It's just so crazy.

— Perry on the relevance of "Part of Me" following its release.

Katy Perry wrote "Part of Me" with Dr. Luke, Bonnie McKee, and Max Martin during the 2010 Teenage Dream writing sessions, which also produced the Hot 100 number-one singles "California Gurls", "Teenage Dream" and "Last Friday Night (T.G.I.F.)." Cirkut also helped produce the track with Luke and Martin. Perry and McKee had been casual friends prior to Perry's request for her help with a song that Perry had been writing called "Part of Me". According to Rolling Stone, McKee stayed up all night writing the lyrics. When Perry was presented the song, she shouted "We're buying you a car!" by the time she heard the third line.

Perry recorded a demo of the track that leaked in full on December 30, 2010. The song was rumored to be a leftover cut from her Teenage Dream recording sessions, and fans speculated that the track might be included in an as-yet-unconfirmed re-release of the LP. This re-release was confirmed in January 2012, when Perry announced through her official website that the album would contain all twelve songs from the original album, plus three new songs and a remix, and would be released on March 26, 2012.

On February 13, 2012, "Part of Me" received an official release as the lead single from the album's re-release. Perry had planned all along to release the song on the deluxe edition of the album rather than the original, as it did not fit that album's composition. On February 11, two days before its worldwide premiere, the song was leaked for a second time with a reworked production and slightly changed lyrics. "Part of Me" was released to most iTunes stores worldwide on February 18, 2012, following her performance at the 54th Grammy Awards. In the United States, "Part of Me" was sent to contemporary radio playlists on February 21, 2012. The song was released in England, Scotland, Wales, France, and Ireland on March 18, 2012 under the digital download and CD single formats. Perry revealed via Twitter that all profits raised from the sales of the single would be donated to MusiCares. The photograph by Mary Ellen Matthews that was used on the single cover was part of a photographic essay for Perry's appearance in episode 710 of the television program Saturday Night Live.

== Composition and lyrical interpretation ==
"Part of Me"
A 22 second sample of the song's chorus, in which Perry declares herself unbreakable to her ex-lover as she sings "This is the part of me that you're never gonna ever take away from me" over a house beat.

"Part of Me" is a dance-pop and power pop song set to a house beat. It is composed in the key of D minor and set in a 4/4 time signature at a tempo of 130 beats per minute. The melody spans the tonal range of D_{4} to D_{5}, while the music follows the chord progression of Dm–F–B♭–C and switches to a chord progression of C–Dm–F–C–Dm–F–C–Dm–F–C during the bridge. Production was done by Perry's frequent collaborator, Dr. Luke. The song begins with Perry's somber and emotional delivery of the line, "Days like this I want to drive away/ Pack my bags and watch your shadow fade." At the bridge, the beat amplifies and Perry's lyrics become more aggressive as she commands "Now Look at Me!", signalling to her ex that she is still strong, regardless of what he tries to do to bring her down. The beat reaches a peak at the chorus, and Perry's tone and the song's lyrics become more aggressive and prominent as she sings, "This is the Part of me that you're never gonna ever take away from me." As the song continues, Perry's lyrics become strong and empowered: "So you can keep the diamond ring/ It don't mean nothing anyway/ In fact you can keep everything Yeah/ Yeah Except for me". Perry repeats the ending chorus as the beat fades.

James Dinh of MTV News noted that "the pop star appears strong, bold and just a tad resentful after a breakup" on the track. His analysis of the lyrics observed that "The singer declares herself unbreakable after a breakup, evident in lines such as "Days like this I want to drive away/ Pack my bags and watch your shadow fade/ 'Cause you chewed me up and spit me out/ Like I was poison in your mouth/ You took my light, you drained me down/ But that was then and this is now, now look at me." Dinh pointed out similarities between "Part of Me" and Perry's previous single "California Gurls", noting that "the tune's steady beat amplifies" as the chorus starts. Andrew Hampp of Billboard described the song as a "dance-floor rave up", and compared the song's composition to Jessie J's "Domino". Edna Gundersen from USA Today stated: "Katy Perry could be addressing her ex or her detractors on this defiant slapdown, a gleaming "Firework"-like pop torpedo propelled by slick beats and a brazen chorus." Chris Ryan, also of MTV, inferred that the song was aimed at Perry's ex-boyfriend Travie McCoy, while New York magazine journalist Amanda Dobbis described it as "another break-up anthem". Fans and media noted differences in the lyrics between the demo and the single, and claimed that the changes redirected the song's subject from McCoy to Perry's ex-husband Russell Brand, from whom she had recently divorced. Perry declared it was not about Brand, stating:

I wrote it two years ago, which is funny because everybody is like "God, it sounds so current," and some people that I work with were like "You should just say you wrote it a couple of weeks ago." I'm like "I'm not a dick, I'm going to tell the truth." I wrote it two years ago when I was writing and recording Teenage Dream, [but] it didn't feel right on the record. I would've had to take out one of my other songs that [made the album] a nice, complete package.

== Critical reception ==
Jody Rosen of Rolling Stone gave the song three stars out of five, calling it "just plain predictable." Steven Hyden and Genevieve Koski of The A.V. Club were positive of the song, with Hyden, giving it a B+, noted that, although the lyrics seemed "dopey", the production and the chorus are "pretty damn sticky", while Koski, giving the song a B, noted that the song follows a similar formula to several of Perry's previous singles but went on to say that "the template works well in the context of a break-up anthem" and positively remarked that it comes off as "a chintzier, 2012 version of 'Since U Been Gone.'"

A reviewer from the Christian group Focus on the Family criticized Perry's decision to create an uplifting song about such a serious subject matter as divorce: "Framing the song in terms of her divorce from Brand, though 'Part of Me', puts a much more somber and serious spin on things. This is no mere breakup. It's the demolition of a marital covenant. So no matter how bad things were in her relationship, no matter how much better she feels now, no matter how cathartic the pulsing beats (courtesy of hitmeisters Max Martin and Dr. Luke) might feel, the ultimate end here is a very sad one indeed." Priya Elan of NME panned the song: 'This is the part of me, that you're never going to take away from me,' "she sings in that strange angry robot voice of hers. “The sentiment, as ever, is punch you in face crystal clear and probably meant something to one of the (probably) 17 writers who wrote the song.”

== Commercial performance ==
In the United States, "Part of Me" debuted at number one on the Billboard Hot 100 and the U.S. Hot Digital Songs chart, with 411,000 copies sold in its first week. It was the twentieth song to debut atop the Billboard Hot 100. "Part of Me" became Perry's seventh number-one song, and her sixth in the 2010s. The single debuted at number 36 on the Hot 100 Airplay chart, with 35 million radio impressions in its first week, and was Perry's ninth song to top the Hot Dance Club Songs chart. It is Perry's tenth single to be certified Platinum by the RIAA, for sales of over 1 million copies. As of January 2015, the single has sold 2,780,000 copies in the US.

In Canada, "Part of Me" debuted at number one on the Canadian Hot 100. In Brazil, it reached the top spot on the Brazil Pop 100. In Mexico, the song peaked in the top 10 of the Mexican Hot 100. It also peaked at number 1 in Venezuela. In New Zealand, song was Perry's first single to debut at number one on the New Zealand Singles Chart, and as her seventh to reach that spot, tied her with Mariah Carey as the artist with the most number-one hits in New Zealand. It has received a Platinum certification by the RIANZ, with over 15,000 copies sold. In Australia, "Part of Me" debuted at number 22 on the ARIA Singles Chart, and peaked at number five on the chart. The recording has been certified 2× platinum by the ARIA, with 140,000 copies sold.

In the United Kingdom, "Part of Me" debuted at number 1 on the UK Singles Chart on March 25, 2012 – for the week ending date March 31, 2012 – selling 79,079 copies in its first week, beating "She Doesn't Mind" by Sean Paul to the summit of the chart to become Perry's third number-one song in Britain, following "I Kissed a Girl" in August 2008 and "California Gurls" in June 2010. "Part of Me" was certified platinum by the British Phonographic Industry for sales and streams of over 600,000. In the Republic of Ireland, "Part of Me" peaked at number five on the Irish Singles Chart and was Perry's twelfth single to reach the top ten in the Irish Republic. In Italy, the song was certified Gold for sales of over 15,000.

== Music video ==
=== Background and development ===
The music video for "Part of Me" was directed by Ben Mor. Filming began on February 16, 2012, and took place over the course of three days at USMC Camp Pendleton in Oceanside, California. Perry announced the video shortly after the song's release, tweeting, "Holy power of the Grammy's, Part Of Me is already top 10 on itunes! U guys are killing it! NICE! Can't wait to shoot this video! #grateful." Her preparation for the video shoot included vigorous training in military basics, including firepower, military etiquette, and combat training.

As filming began, pictures from the video set surfaced online, showing Perry with short hair and dressed in military clothing. The music video premiered on March 21, 2012 during the program MTV First: Katy Perry, in which Perry discussed her experiences filming the video and the background of the video's plot:

Well, I actually had the idea, I wrote the story about what it is actually like to be in the Service, and it does take a lot of physical strength, but now that I've been through it – and even just for the three days I was there, [it's] a lot of mental strength. We used only Marines, no actors or actresses. We used all of the Marine's equipment and they were so lovely to us, I always have fun even though it's a lot of work. Even though I was sore and exhausted, I was so educated on people in the service, who I've always respected but the stuff they go through, and the kind of loyalty they possess, it's very communal, and community. Not to sound weird, but it seems like the heart of America. Seriously, the heart.

=== Synopsis ===
Perry featured in military camouflage, signaling her final transformation into a Marine

Perry sits in her car outside boyfriend Jason's (Lucas Kerr) workplace and sees him flirting with a woman. Perry confronts him in his office, slams down her heart pendant on the desk, and ends their relationship before Jason can talk to her. Perry storms out the door. The title track begins as we see Perry driving to a gas station, where she buys a can of tea. After paying for her items, she sees a moto-sticker on a notice board which reads, "All women are created equal, then some become Marines". The increasingly emotional Perry gathers her possessions from her car trunk, enters a nearby restroom, and begins her change of identity. She tearfully cuts her hair short, removes her bracelets, flattens her breasts, and changes into a hoodie and jeans.

Perry enlists in the United States Marine Corps, and after a brief scene of recruit training, reports to the School of Infantry for the Marine Corps' rigorous basic combat instruction course. She reminisces over her experiences with her ex-boyfriend, yet remains spiteful towards him. She then burns a love note from him (as opposed to a Dear John letter) and vents her frustration through the Marine Corps Martial Arts Program. The remainder of the video depicts Perry's training, and shows her dancing beneath a large garrison flag. Perry ultimately transforms into a trained warrior, clad in camouflage marine pattern, body armor and face paint.

=== Reception ===
The video garnered positive reviews from critics, who praised its self-empowerment theme and its different approach in comparison to Perry's previous music videos. Bruna Nessif of E! Online compared the video to Demi Moore's role in G.I. Jane. Ray Rahman from Entertainment Weekly echoed the similarity of the G.I. Jane influence in the video, and called it an "intense ride". MTV's James Montgomery praised the video and Perry's role, saying:

"Over the years, Perry has been a California Gurl, a nerdy teenager, an alien and just about everything in between, but up until now, she's never really been an actual person." He went on to praise the video stating: "Part of Me" is unlike any pop video in recent memory. Rihanna did military chic in her "Hard" video (she even straddled a tank), and just about every one of Perry's pop contemporaries have ventured down the same path. But they were never really in the military; they were just making it more fabulous. Perry takes the opposite tact [sic]: She cuts off her hair, she eschews makeup, she fights, crawls, suffers. It's a commendable level of commitment. Your move, everybody else."

Feminist author Naomi Wolf criticized the video as propaganda for the Marine Corps, stating "I really want to find out if she was paid by them for making it ..... it is truly shameful. I would suggest a boycott of this singer whom I really liked if you are as offended at this glorification of violence as I am." Glenn Selig, founder of The Publicity Agency, responded to these claims on Fox News Live, stating, "In her efforts to boycott the video, Naomi Wolf has brought more attention to it, without her comments, most people would clearly have seen the military simply as a metaphor and not as an attempt by Katy Perry to glamorize the military or war." Perry told MTV that she chose the military plot because it represented the song, saying, "It's an affirmation of strength, so I wanted to go the strongest route I ever could."

== Live performances ==
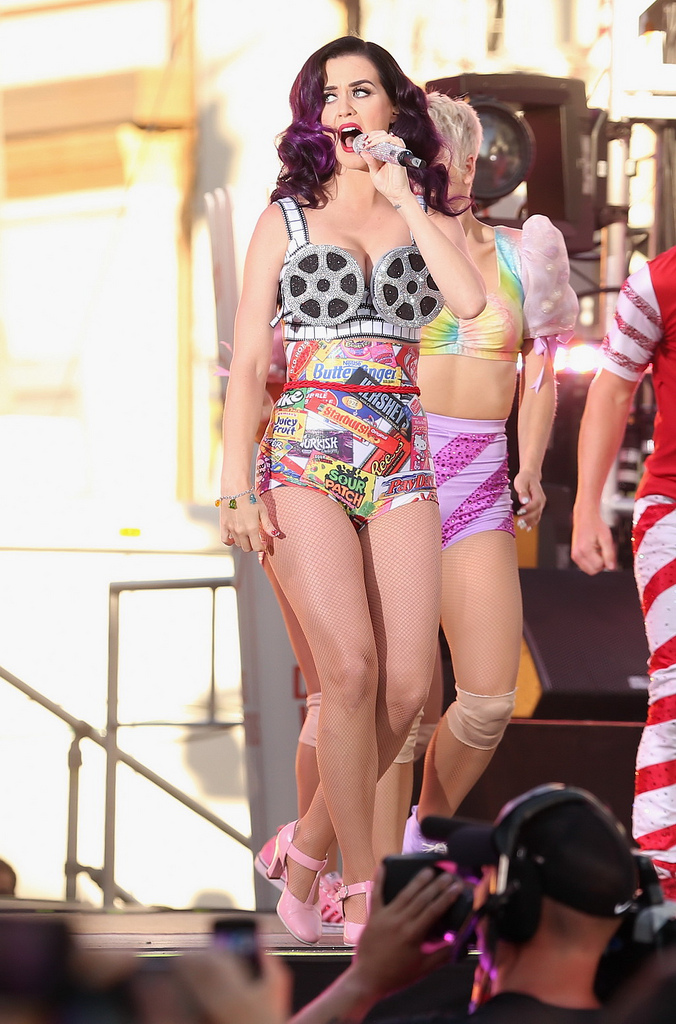
Perry performing "Part of Me" at the premiere of Katy Perry: Part of Me

"Part of Me" was given its first live performance on February 12, 2012, at the 54th Grammy Awards. The performance began with "E.T." with dancers and a singer who appeared to be Perry on a darkened stage. It ended partway through the chorus as electronic sound effects and the lights and sound suddenly went out, implying technical difficulties. Wearing sunglasses and a metallic bodysuit with the appearance of golden armor, a blue-haired Perry, slowly singing the first part of "Part of Me," descended from the roof of the venue in a transparent cube, revealing the singer on the stage below to be a body double. Perry shattered the cube, fireworks went off around the stage, and Perry began "Part of Me" as the dancers present during "E.T." reappeared, lifted her up, and performed a routine behind her.

On March 19, 2012, Perry performed "Part of Me" as part of a Live Lounge special for BBC Radio 1, along with "The One That Got Away" (2011), "Firework" (2011), "Thinking of You" (2009) and a censored version of "Niggas in Paris" (2011). The performances were closely similar, through their depiction of Perry as a superhero and their theme of self-empowerment. Katie Brine of MTV News commented that "Even when Katy is getting serious, there's always fun to be had."

On April 26, 2012, Perry performed the track on season 11 of American Idol. This was similar to her previous performances and the video, but was pre-taped due to illness. After a short, introductory military-style video, Perry made a simulated airdrop onto a military base peopled by female background dancers, all clad in military clothing. The complexity and originality of the performance were praised. Brian Mansfield, of USA Today, called it a "pretty impressive production", but criticized Perry's vocal abilities.

On June 26, 2012, she performed "Part of Me" in her set list at the premiere for her July 2012 3D autobiographical documentary-concert film Katy Perry: Part of Me on Hollywood Boulevard as part of Pepsi's "Summer Beats" concert series. During the performance, Perry emerged from a large box of popcorn, wearing a shirt that resembled a film reel with the stage decorated with life-sized lollipops and neon lights. This was Perry's final performance prior to her taking a musical hiatus after two years of continuous promotion for Teenage Dream.

The song is a regular part of the setlist for her Prismatic World Tour and Witness: The Tour.

On June 4, 2017, Perry performed an acoustic rendition of "Part of Me" at the One Love Manchester benefit concert for the victims of the Manchester Arena bombing.

== Usage in media ==
"Part of Me" was used in a national marketing campaign for The Sims 3 limited-edition expansion pack, The Sims 3: Showtime. Perry filmed a 30-second commercial, in which she performed the song onstage as a Sim version of herself. The expansion pack includes Katy Perry-themed items, inspired by the concept and artwork of her album Teenage Dream (2010), that players can use on their own Sims. In May 2012, Perry signed a deal with Pepsi to promote Katy Perry: Part of Me. This deal was a part of Pepsi's first global campaign, titled "Live For Now", which partners with entertainment artists and properties to promote their work. "Part of Me" was used in a series of trailers as part of this deal as well as various other media related campaigns to promote the film. The track is available as downloadable content for the video games Just Dance 4 and Just Dance 2014.

== Formats and track listings ==
- US Digital download
1. "Part of Me" – 3:35
- US Digital download – Remix
1. "Part of Me" (Jacques Lu Cont's Thin White Duke Mix) – 6:02
- UK Digital download – Remix EP
1. "Part of Me" – 3:35
2. "Part of Me" (Jacques Cont's Thin White Duke Mix) – 6:02
3. "Part of Me" (Jacques Cont's Thin White Duke Radio Edit) – 3:47
4. "Part of Me" (Instrumental) – 3:35
- CD single
1. "Part of Me" – 3:35
2. "Tommie Sunshine's Megasix Smash-Up" – 7:03
- Digital download – The Remixes
1. Part of Me (Freemasons Radio Edit) – 3:57
2. Part of Me (Freemasons Mixshow Edit) – 5:48
3. Part of Me (Freemasons Dub) – 7:58
4. Part of Me (Freemasons Club Mix) – 8:18

== Personnel ==
Credits adapted from Teenage Dream: The Complete Confection liner notes.

- Katy Perry – vocals, songwriting
- Dr. Luke – songwriting, production
- Max Martin – songwriting, production
- Bonnie McKee – songwriting
- Cirkut – production

== Charts ==
=== Weekly charts ===
Weekly chart performance
| Chart (2012) | Peak position |
|---|---|
| Australia (ARIA) | 5 |
| Austria (Ö3 Austria Top 40) | 18 |
| Belgium (Ultratop 50 Flanders) | 18 |
| Belgium (Ultratop 50 Wallonia) | 28 |
| Bulgaria Airplay (BAMP) | 1 |
| Brazil Hot 100 Airplay (Billboard Brasil) | 25 |
| Canada Hot 100 (Billboard) | 1 |
| CIS Airplay (TopHit) | 99 |
| Czech Republic Airplay (ČNS IFPI) | 17 |
| Euro Digital Song Sales (Billboard) | 3 |
| Finland Download (Latauslista) | 26 |
| France (SNEP) | 13 |
| Germany (GfK) | 20 |
| Hungary (Rádiós Top 40) | 6 |
| Ireland (IRMA) | 5 |
| Israel International Airplay (Media Forest) | 9 |
| Italy (FIMI) | 14 |
| Japan (Japan Hot 100) | 22 |
| Lebanon (Lebanese Top 20) | 3 |
| Mexico (Billboard Mexican Airplay) | 8 |
| Netherlands (Dutch Top 40) | 27 |
| Netherlands (Single Top 100) | 28 |
| New Zealand (Recorded Music NZ) | 1 |
| Scottish Singles Sales (Official Charts) | 1 |
| Slovakia Airplay (ČNS IFPI) | 11 |
| South Korea Foreign (Circle) | 6 |
| Spain (Promusicae) | 48 |
| Switzerland (Schweizer Hitparade) | 33 |
| Turkey (Number One Top 20) | 11 |
| Ukraine Airplay (TopHit) | 59 |
| UK Singles (Official Charts) | 1 |
| UK Streaming (OCC) | 21 |
| US Billboard Hot 100 | 1 |
| US Adult Contemporary (Billboard) | 18 |
| US Adult Pop Airplay (Billboard) | 4 |
| US Dance Club Songs (Billboard) | 1 |
| US Dance Mix/Show Airplay (Billboard) | 4 |
| US Pop Airplay (Billboard) | 3 |
| US Rhythmic Airplay (Billboard) | 22 |
| Venezuela Pop Rock General (Record Report) | 1 |

=== Monthly charts ===
Monthly chart performance
| Chart (2012) | Peak position |
|---|---|
| Ukraine Airplay (TopHit) | 76 |

=== Year-end charts ===
Year-end chart performance
| Chart (2012) | Position |
|---|---|
| Australia (ARIA) | 45 |
| Brazil (Crowley) | 21 |
| Canada Hot 100 (Billboard) | 18 |
| France (SNEP) | 98 |
| Hungary (Rádiós Top 40) | 44 |
| Italy (FIMI) | 74 |
| New Zealand (Recorded Music NZ) | 32 |
| South Korea Foreign (Circle) | 86 |
| UK Singles (Official Charts) | 55 |
| US Billboard Hot 100 | 31 |
| US Adult Contemporary (Billboard) | 40 |
| US Adult Top 40 (Billboard) | 26 |
| US Dance Club Songs (Billboard) | 36 |
| US Dance/Mix Show Airplay (Billboard) | 31 |
| US Pop Airplay (Billboard) | 24 |

== Certifications and sales ==
Sales and certifications for "Part of Me"
| Region | Certification | Certified units/sales |
|---|---|---|
| Australia (ARIA) | 7× Platinum | 490,000^{‡} |
| Austria (IFPI Austria) | Platinum | 30,000^{*} |
| Brazil (Pro-Música Brasil) | Diamond | 250,000^{‡} |
| Canada (Music Canada) | 6× Platinum | 480,000^{‡} |
| Denmark (IFPI Danmark) | Platinum | 90,000^{‡} |
| Finland | 2× Platinum | 8,000 |
| France (SNEP) | Platinum | 200,000^{‡} |
| Germany (BVMI) | Gold | 150,000^{‡} |
| Italy (FIMI) | Gold | 15,000^{*} |
| Mexico (AMPROFON) | Gold | 30,000^{*} |
| New Zealand (RMNZ) | 3× Platinum | 90,000^{‡} |
| South Korea | — | 304,829 (Note: South Korea sales figures as of December 2012.) |
| United Kingdom (BPI) | Platinum | 600,000^{‡} |
| United States (RIAA) | 5× Platinum | 5,000,000^{‡} |
Streaming
| Denmark (IFPI Danmark) | Gold | 900,000^{†} |
| Greece (IFPI Greece) | Gold | 1,000,000^{†} |
| Sweden (GLF) | Platinum | 8,000,000^{†} |
^{*} Sales figures based on certification alone.^{‡} Sales+streaming figures based on certification alone.^{†} Streaming-only figures based on certification alone.

== Release history ==
Release dates and formats
| Region | Date | Format | Label | Ref. |
|---|---|---|---|---|
| Australia | February 14, 2012 | Digital download | Capitol | |
| Austria | February 14, 2012 | Digital download | Capitol | |
| Belgium | February 14, 2012 | Digital download | Capitol | |
| Czech Republic | February 14, 2012 | Digital download | Capitol | |
| Denmark | February 14, 2012 | Digital download | Capitol | |
| Finland | February 14, 2012 | Digital download | Capitol | |
| Germany | February 14, 2012 | Digital download | Capitol | |
| Italy | February 14, 2012 | Digital download | Capitol | |
| Japan | February 14, 2012 | Digital download | Capitol | |
| Netherlands | February 14, 2012 | Digital download | Capitol | |
| New Zealand | February 14, 2012 | Digital download | Capitol | |
| Norway | February 14, 2012 | Digital download | Capitol | |
| Portugal | February 14, 2012 | Digital download | Capitol | |
| Spain | February 14, 2012 | Digital download | Capitol | |
| Sweden | February 14, 2012 | Digital download | Capitol | |
| Switzerland | February 14, 2012 | Digital download | Capitol | |
| United States | February 21, 2012 | Contemporary hit radio | Capitol | |
| Ireland | March 18, 2012 | Digital download | Capitol | |
| United Kingdom | March 18, 2012 | Digital download | Capitol | |
| United Kingdom | April 23, 2012 | CD | Capitol | |

== See also ==
- Military-entertainment complex
- Katy Perry: Part of Me, a film by Perry
- List of number-one pop hits of 2012 (Brazil)
- List of Billboard Hot 100 number ones of 2012
- List of Canadian Hot 100 number-one singles of 2012
- List of Billboard Dance Club Songs number ones of 2012
