= Showdown of Champions =

The Showdown of Champions was the tennis exhibition tournament with four tennis champions from different eras: Roger Federer, James Blake, John McEnroe and Björn Borg. The format of events was an extravaganza of challenge matches at the 12,000 seat Putra Stadium in Bukit Jalil, Kuala Lumpur on Tuesday, November 18, 2008.

== Summary ==
One set between Borg and McEnroe followed by one set between Federer and James Blake, and a final doubles set with Federer and Borg against McEnroe and Blake. Federer rallied from 3–1 down against Blake to win 7–6, taking the tiebreaker 10–7.

John McEnroe won the battle of the old timers when he beat former arch-rival Björn Borg 7–6 (13–11). For Borg and McEnroe, both sporting grey hair, it was a walk down memory lane, revisiting the highs and lows of their bitter rivalry, typified by the 1980 Wimbledon final won by Borg in five gruelling sets.

McEnroe played to the crowd, making fun of himself, only occasionally glaring at the linesman or umpire and throwing his racquet just twice. In spite of being 52, Borg showed he hadn't lost his touch, still exhibiting some sublime passing shots that left 49-year-old McEnroe grudgingly nodding his approval.

"He was my great rival and I knew it would be close," said McEnroe. Borg added: "Playing John is always special for me. It was a great rivalry and playing him again brings back some great memories."

Federer then teamed up with Borg for the first time ever to play a set against McEnroe and Blake in an event that featured players who have won 31 Grand Slam titles between them. Doubles match was won by James Blake and John McEnroe 7–5.
