= Wide Awake (Katy Perry song) =

2012 single by Katy Perry

Single by Katy Perry

from the album Teenage Dream: The Complete Confection
- Released: May 22, 2012
- Studio: NightBird (West Hollywood, California)
- Genre: Dance-pop
- Length: 3:41
- Label: Capitol
- Songwriters: Katy Perry; Lukasz Gottwald; Max Martin; Bonnie McKee; Henry Walter
- Producers: Dr. Luke; Cirkut

Katy Perry singles chronology
"Part of Me" (2012)	"Wide Awake" (2012)	"Roar" (2013)

Music video
- "Wide Awake" on YouTube

"Wide Awake" is a song by American singer-songwriter Katy Perry from Teenage Dream: The Complete Confection (2012), the reissue of her third studio album, Teenage Dream (2010). She co-wrote the song with Max Martin and Bonnie McKee, alongside its producers Dr. Luke and Cirkut. The song was recorded at NightBird Studios, based in West Hollywood, California. It was specifically written for Perry's autobiographical film Katy Perry: Part of Me (2012). Capitol Records released the song onto radio stations on May 22, 2012. The track is a power ballad styled in dance-pop, and features lyrics about the reality of a break up and moving forward.

"Wide Awake" became another commercial success for Perry. In the United States, it peaked at number two on the Billboard Hot 100 and topped the charts in Canada and New Zealand while reaching the top 10 in Australia, Hungary, Ireland, Lebanon, and the United Kingdom, as well as the top 20 in Brazil, Italy, and Slovakia. The single's music video was directed by Lance Drake, and featured a fairy tale-like story, starring Perry and a child version of her. The video also makes references from Perry's Teenage Dream singles and the previous Complete Confection single "Part of Me".

== Background and release ==
This song in particular is a dose of reality. It's kind of like coming down from a high. You've been on cloud nine for so long, and it can't always be so sweet and sometimes you need to realize that, and you have to pick yourself up and move forward and face the facts of life and know that this is just a lesson you learn and you're stronger because of it

— Perry on the theme of "Wide Awake" following its release.

Perry co-wrote "Wide Awake" with Bonnie McKee, Max Martin, and its producers Cirkut and Dr. Luke. The production coordination was helmed by Irene Richter and Katie Mitzell. Recorded at NightBird Recording Studios in West Hollywood, California, it was engineered by Clint Gibbs, who was assisted by Angelo Caputo, and John Hanes, and was mixed by Serban Ghenea.

According to Perry, "Wide Awake" was inspired by "major life changes", including her divorce from actor and comedian Russell Brand. In an interview with MTV News, Perry revealed, "Well, this song, I have a lot of different emotions and feelings in all of my songs. This song in particular is a dose of reality. It's kind of like coming down from a high. You’ve been on cloud nine for so long, and it can't always be so sweet and sometimes you need to realize that, and you have to pick yourself up and move forward and face the facts of life and know that this is just a lesson you learn and you're stronger because of it." Initially Max Martin had produced a demo with the chorus being "No Matter What"; however due to his accent, McKee misheard the lyrics as "I'm Wide Awake/I'm Born Again" and wrote the song around that hook. McKee opined that the song represented Perry's departure from her previous releases.

"Wide Awake" impacted US contemporary hit radio on May 22, 2012, through Capitol Records, in support of Perry's autobiographical film Katy Perry: Part of Me. The single's cover artwork was released on the same day via Perry's Twitter account, featuring Perry with deep purple hair and multicolored lettering.

== Composition ==
"Wide Awake" is a midtempo dance-pop ballad. Sheet music for "Wide Awake" is set in the key of F major with a moderately fast tempo. The vocals span from C_{4} to D_{5}.

"Wide Awake" is lyrically about the reality of a break up and moving on, which many have believed to have been written about Perry's ex-husband, Russell Brand, since it was written and recorded after the divorce. Byron Flitsch from MTV stated that the downtempo melody of the song "highlights the song's introspective lyrics". Perry's Christian upbringing is also prominent on "Wide Awake", which references the concept of being born-again.

== Critical reception ==
Jody Rosen from Rolling Stone awarded "Wide Awake" three and a half stars out of five. He praised the song's composition, provided by Dr. Luke, Max Martin, and Bonnie McKee, and also felt it was, musically, a more comfortable side for Perry than "Part of Me". Robert Copsey from Digital Spy commented that the song sees Perry in "reflective mode", and gave it four stars out of five. However, in an album review for Teenage Dream: The Complete Confection, Melissa Maerz from Entertainment Weekly was more critical of the song, deeming it a "weepie" and a "kind of bummer", along with "Part of Me". In their list of "The 10 Best Guilty Pleasure Songs of 2012", Ernest Baker and Lauren Nostro from Complex listed "Wide Awake" at number 8, describing its beat as "sparse and contemplative", while describing it as Perry's 808s & Heartbreak in "one succinct take".

"Wide Awake" was nominated for the Grammy Award for Best Pop Solo Performance at the 55th Annual Grammy Awards but lost to the live version of "Set Fire to the Rain" by Adele.

== Commercial performance ==
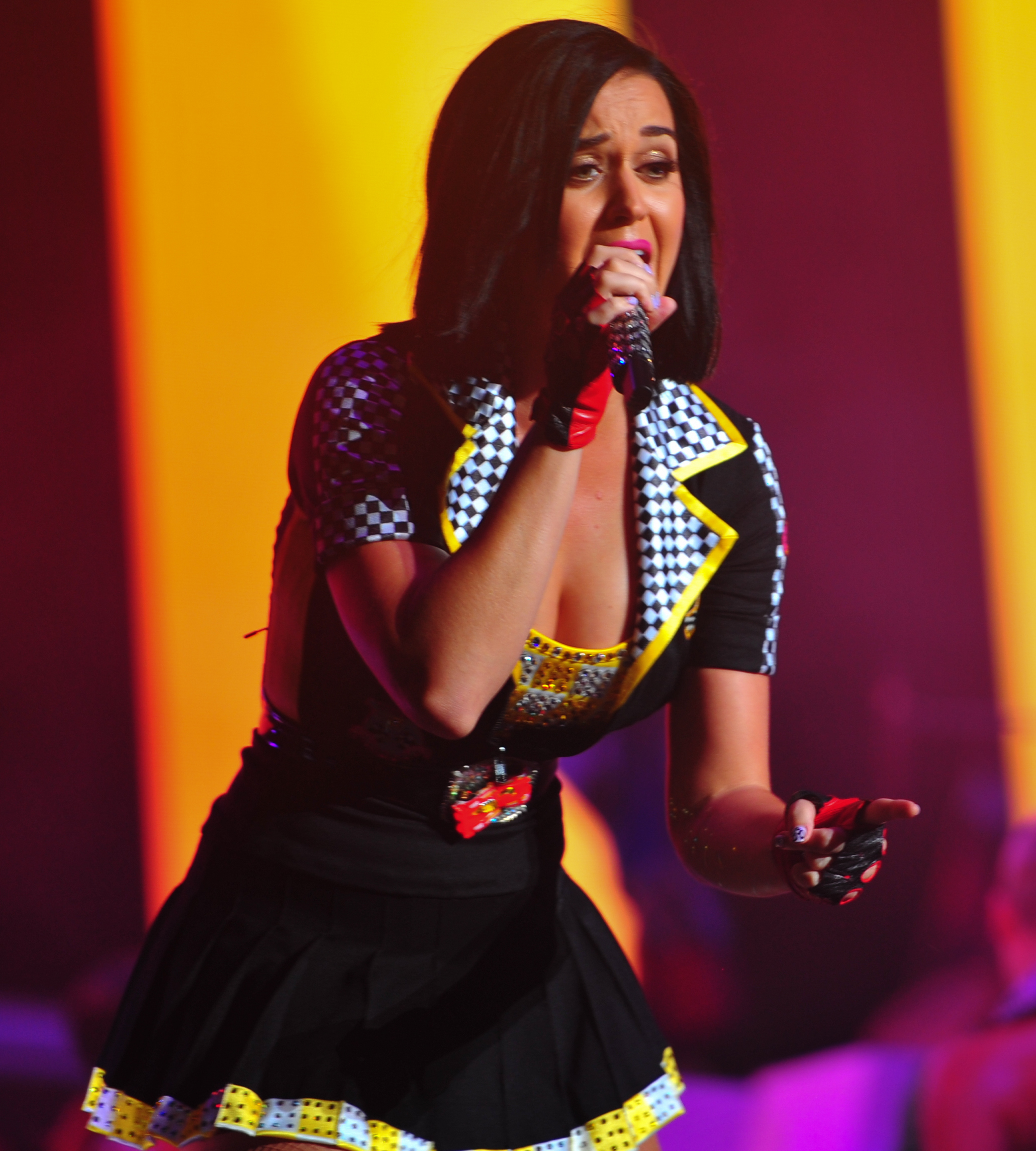
Perry (pictured) performing "Wide Awake"

In the United States, "Wide Awake" made its first appearance on the US Billboard Bubbling Under Hot 100 chart at number 19 based on digital sales alone following the release of Teenage Dream: The Complete Confection. After Perry's performance on the 2012 Billboard Music Awards, it debuted on the Billboard Hot 100 at number 35 as the second highest debut of the week, behind Phillip Phillips' "Home". The same week, the song debuted on multiple Billboard component charts – at number 29 on the Pop Songs and 35 on the Adult Pop Songs charts. For the chart issue dated June 4, 2012, "Wide Awake" debuted at number 50 on the Dance/Club Play Songs chart as well as moving 5 spots on the Pop songs chart to number 20. The song reached the summit on the week of August 4, 2012. On June 13, 2012, the single moved ten positions to nine on the Billboard Hot 100, and has sold 402,000 downloads. The following week, the single reached number four, and on the chart dated August 11, 2012, it peaked at number two on the Billboard Hot 100, making the song Perry's eighth consecutive single to reach the top three of the chart since "California Gurls", as well as her first song to peak in the runner-up position. It was kept off the top spot by Carly Rae Jepsen's "Call Me Maybe". On the week August 4, 2012, the song topped the Dance Club Songs chart, making her tenth consecutive number-one on the chart since 2009's "Waking Up in Vegas", extending her own record. The song has sold 3.5 million copies in the nation as of August 2020 and received a quintuple platinum certification from the Recording Industry Association of America (RIAA).

In Australia, the song debuted at number 26 on the Australian Singles Chart, and peaked at number four, position it stayed in for three weeks. In New Zealand, the song debuted at number 32, and peaked at number one on July 1, 2012, making it Perry's seventh single from the album Teenage Dream to peak inside the top 10, and her sixth song from the Teenage Dream era to take out the number one spot. The song was then certified Gold by the Recording Industry Association of New Zealand (RIANZ). The song is the eighth song from Teenage Dream to enter the top ten, and the ninth consecutive top ten single since "Waking Up in Vegas" and its eleventh top ten overall. The song makes Perry the female artist with the most number ones on New Zealand (eight), passing the previous record of Mariah Carey with seven number one singles. In Canada, the song peaked at number one, becoming her eighth single to do so. It also peaked at number one on the Canadian Adult Contemporary (AC), CHR/Top 40, and Hot AC airplay charts monitored by Nielsen Broadcast Data Systems. The song became the 21st best selling single in New Zealand of 2012. In the United Kingdom, the song debuted at number 69 on the UK Singles Chart, due to strong downloads in April 2012. The song then re-entered at number 74 in May 2012. It has peaked at number nine, selling 24,545 copies in that country. In Ireland, the song launched at number 30 and is currently peaking at number six.

== Music video ==
=== Background ===
In March 2012, Perry told MTV: "I know exactly what that music video is. I know exactly who is directing it. I know the art direction, the people, the narrative, and I had that idea while I was writing the song". Filming of the official 3D music video for "Wide Awake" began on April 30, 2012, and ended on May 2, 2012. The music video was directed by Tony T. Datis and was used as a tie-in promotion for her 2012 3D autobiographical documentary film, Katy Perry: Part of Me, as part of her deal with Pepsi.

On June 12, 2012, an official trailer directed by Lance Drake, was released on Perry's Vevo channel. It started with a girl flipping through a book which displays flashbacks of the Teenage Dream era, describing each of the singles as a "chapter", with "Wide Awake" being "the final chapter". A second preview aired on June 13, 2012, during the season finale of the program Randy Jackson Presents: America's Best Dance Crew.

=== Synopsis ===
Perry as she explores a crepuscular labyrinth with a lantern in the music video for "Wide Awake"

The video starts with Perry finishing shooting the topless cloud scene for the "California Gurls" video and going to her dressing room while talking with her assistant Johnny Wujek. She then takes off her wig, looks into the mirror, and the setting turns to a dark labyrinth, with Perry holding a lantern. The camera pans up to show the entire labyrinth, while also revealing a hill with light shining through the clouds onto it. Perry sees a strawberry, picks it off and eats it, and the walls close in on her. Perry pushes the walls, as a firework shoots from her chest into the dark sky, a reference to her "Firework" video. A door opens to reveal a younger version of Perry (Zoey Diaz), and their hands touch. The two reach a mirror in which the younger Perry does not have a reflection, and paparazzi taking pictures (one of whom is dressed as Freddy Krueger) are seen behind the mirror. The floor begins to crumble as Perry finally shatters the mirror and the shards of the glass become butterflies.

The little girl is then seen pushing a wheelchair in which Perry sits in a hospital gown, trembling with the poisoned strawberry in one hand. In the hallway, they are met by two minotaur guards who block their way. The little girl furiously goes up to them and stomps her foot, sending the minotaurs flying. Perry gets up from the wheelchair, grabbing the little girl's hand as they run down the hallway to the exit. The doors open to reveal a garden. A man dressed as Prince Charming (Jef Groff) appears riding a unicorn, and walks to Perry with fingers crossed behind his back. Perry punches him in the face, sending him through the fence. Perry and the girl find a heart-shaped exit, and the two girls high-five. They hug each other before the little girl places something in Perry's closed fist. The little girl rides away into a suburban neighborhood on a bike with a license plate reading "Katheryn", which is Perry's birth name. Perry returns to her dressing room and opens her fist, revealing a butterfly. The camera pans to a concert stage where Perry stands on a rising platform, and sings the beginning bars of "Teenage Dream" to a full audience as the butterfly flies into the arena.

=== Release and reception ===
The video was supposed to have its world premiere on June 19, 2012. However, the video was unexpectedly uploaded by EMI to the Czech website mixer.cz. one day earlier. Due to this, it was announced that the June 19 premiere was being scrapped and that the release was pushed up to June 18, 2012, on MTV as part of MTV First: Katy Perry. After the premiere, an exclusive 30-minute interview with Perry took place on MTV.com. The music video was also shown on MTV's sibling networks VH1, Logo and TeenNick. In addition, the video went into rotation immediately on mtvU, MTV Hits and AMTV the following morning. Perry stated in an interview that the music video is symbolic of her life, where various scenes in the video are redolent of her rise to stardom, personal struggles, love and marriage.

The music video was met with acclaim from most critics, with a number of them deeming it the best video to date from Perry. E! Online opined in a Twitter status that they love the video and compared it to Alice's Adventures in Wonderland. Rolling Stone gave the clip a positive review, praising its introspective nature, saying that "though the clip recalls familiar looks, the video puts a new spin on it all, recasting every colorful look with a melancholy tone and a darker palette." Hollywoodlife felt that the video was inspiring, while calling Perry a symbol of strength. Entertainment Weekly also credited the fantastical, whimsical vibe of the visual as Perry teams up with her younger self. Perry received three nominations for the video at the 2012 MTV Video Music Awards, winning the prize for Best Art Direction. On April 23, 2023, the video surpassed 1 billion views.

=== Lyric video ===
A lyric video of the track was released on May 20, 2012, when Perry was set to premiere the song at the 2012 Billboard Music Awards. The video implemented the use of the Facebook timeline and displayed a range of posts about the release of the Teenage Dream album, the seven singles (from "California Gurls" to "Part of Me") and the various achievements for the singles and the album. The lyric video received positive reviews from critics with many praising Perry's different approach to lyric videos on YouTube. Contessa Gayles from AOL Music commented that the video "is practically a music video in itself". Jenna Rubenstein from MTV Buzzworthy stated that "it's a clever and emotional way to recall her past successes and offer fans some closure on this chapter of the Katy Perry journey."

== Live performances ==
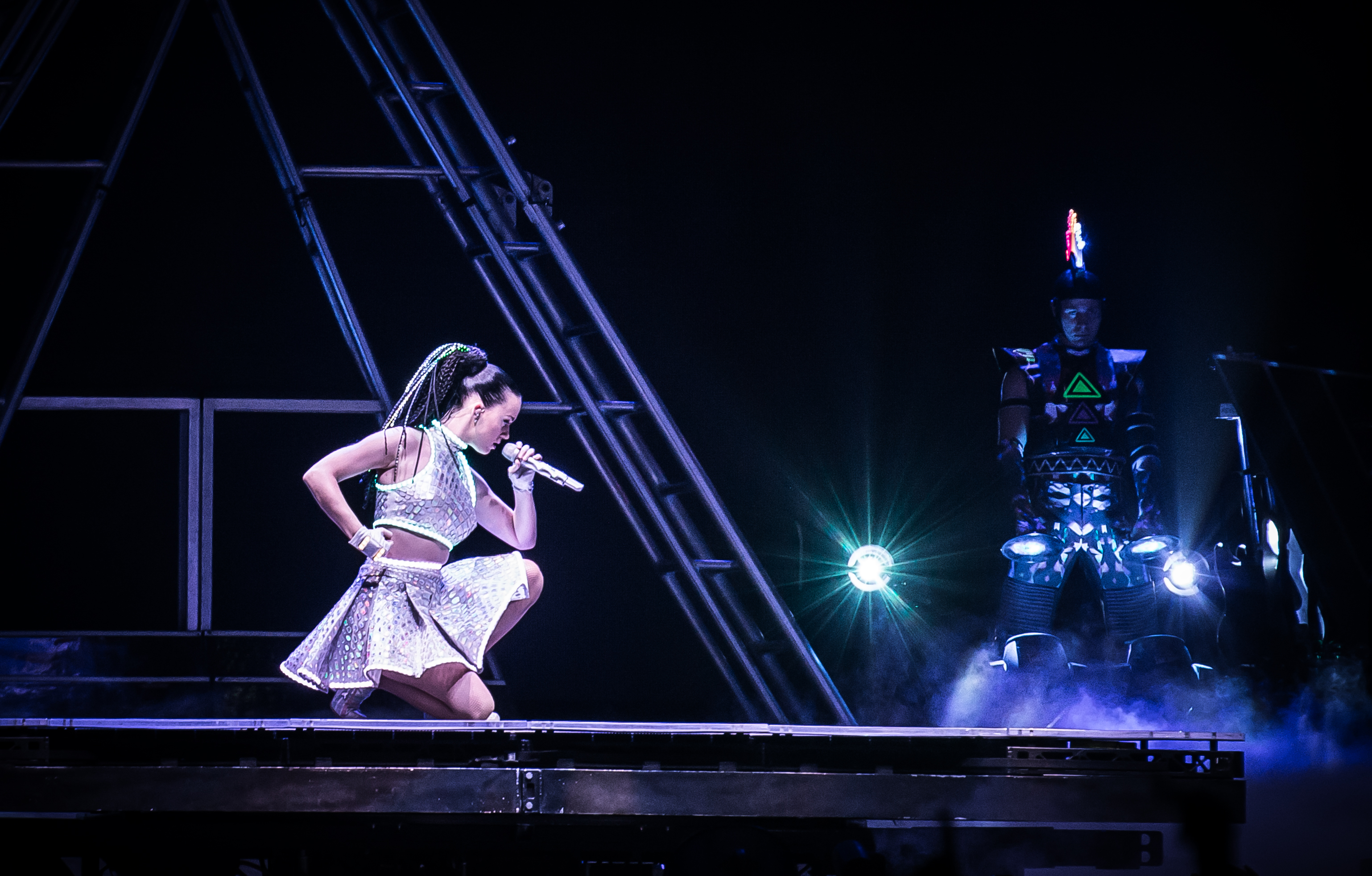
Perry performing "Wide Awake" in Berlin in 2015

Perry debuted the song in an acrobatic fashion for the first time during the 2012 Billboard Music Awards on May 20, 2012, where she floated over the stage in a white ribbon swing keeping her suspended in the air while several background dancers performed with aerial silk. On June 17, 2012, Perry performed "Wide Awake" at 2012 MuchMusic Video Awards, in which she stood on a raised platform, beginning the song as a cocoon and turned into a butterfly when she sang the last chorus. On June 26, Perry performed "Wide Awake" on Jimmy Kimmel Live!. Instead of taking the Kimmel stage, she performed a medley of her songs including "Wide Awake" into her Katy Perry: Part of Me premiere in Hollywood Boulevard in Los Angeles. For President Barack Obama's 2012 presidential candidacy, Perry performed several of her songs dressed as a ballot, including "Teenage Dream", "Firework", and "Wide Awake". Expressing solidarity for his campaign, the box next to Obama's name was shaded.

== Credits and personnel ==
=== Recording locations ===
- Recorded at NightBird Recording Studios (West Hollywood, California)
- Mixed at MixStar Studios (Virginia Beach, California)

=== Personnel ===
- Katy Perry – backing vocals, lead vocals, songwriting
- Lukasz Gottwald – songwriting, producer, instruments, programming
- Max Martin – songwriting
- Bonnie McKee – songwriting
- Henry Walter – songwriting, instruments, programming, producer
- John Hanes – engineering
- Serban Ghenea – mixing

== Charts ==
=== Weekly charts ===
Weekly chart performance for "Wide Awake"
Chart (2012)	Peak position
Australia (ARIA)	4
Austria (Ö3 Austria Top 40)	28
Belgium (Ultratop 50 Flanders)	25
Belgium (Ultratop 50 Wallonia)	48
Brazil (Billboard Brasil Hot 100)	17
Brazil Hot Pop Songs	3
Canada Hot 100 (Billboard)	1
Canada AC (Billboard)	1
Canada CHR/Top 40 (Billboard)	1
Canada Hot AC (Billboard)	1
Czech Republic Airplay (ČNS IFPI)	26
Denmark (Tracklisten)	24
Euro Digital Song Sales (Billboard)	7
France (SNEP)	33
Germany (GfK)	39
Honduras (Honduras Top 50)	9
Hungary (Rádiós Top 40)	5
Hungary (Single Top 40)	4
Ireland (IRMA)	6
Italy (FIMI)	11
Japan Hot 100 (Billboard)	79
Lebanon (Lebanese Top 20)	4
Mexico (Billboard Mexican Airplay)	4
Mexico Anglo (Monitor Latino)	2
Netherlands (Single Top 100)	41
New Zealand (Recorded Music NZ)	1
Scottish Singles Sales (Official Charts)	6
Slovakia Airplay (ČNS IFPI)	13
Switzerland (Schweizer Hitparade)	21
UK Singles (Official Charts)	9
UK Streaming (OCC)	12
Ukraine Airplay (TopHit)	52
US Billboard Hot 100	2
US Adult Contemporary (Billboard)	2
US Adult Pop Airplay (Billboard)	1
US Dance Club Songs (Billboard)	1
US Dance Airplay (Billboard)	2
US Hot Latin Songs (Billboard)	45
US Pop Airplay (Billboard)	1
US Rhythmic Airplay (Billboard)	21
Venezuela Pop Rock General (Record Report)	1

Weekly chart performance for "Wide Awake"
Chart (2024)	Peak position
Indonesia (Billboard)	23

=== Monthly charts ===
Monthly chart performance for "Wide Awake"
Chart (2012)	Peak position
Ukraine Airplay (TopHit)	73

=== Year-end charts ===
Year-end chart performance for "Wide Awake"
Chart (2012)	Position
Australia (ARIA)	35
Brazil (Crowley)	28
Canada (Canadian Hot 100)	16
Italy (FIMI)	64
Hungary (Rádiós Top 40)	77
New Zealand (RIANZ)	21
Spain (Los 40 Principales)	15
UK Singles (OCC)	68
US Billboard Hot 100	15
US Adult Contemporary (Billboard)	17
US Adult Top 40 (Billboard)	9
US Dance Club Songs (Billboard)	15
US Dance/Mix Show Airplay (Billboard)	16
US Mainstream Top 40 (Billboard)	9

Year-end chart performance for "Wide Awake"
Chart (2013)	Position
US Adult Contemporary (Billboard)	18

== Certifications and sales ==
Certifications for "Wide Awake"
Region	Certification	Certified units/sales
Australia (ARIA)	7× Platinum	490,000^{‡}
Austria (IFPI Austria)	Gold	15,000^{*}
Brazil (Pro-Música Brasil)	Diamond	250,000^{‡}
Canada (Music Canada)	6× Platinum	480,000^{‡}
Denmark (IFPI Danmark)	Platinum	90,000^{‡}
Finland	Platinum	4,000
France (SNEP)	Gold	100,000^{‡}
Italy (FIMI)	Platinum	30,000^{‡}
Mexico (AMPROFON)	Gold	30,000^{*}
New Zealand (RMNZ)	2× Platinum	30,000^{*}
United Kingdom (BPI)	Platinum	600,000^{‡}
United States (RIAA)	5× Platinum	5,000,000^{‡}
Streaming
Denmark (IFPI Danmark)	Gold	900,000^{†}
^{*} Sales figures based on certification alone.^{‡} Sales+streaming figures based on certification alone.^{†} Streaming-only figures based on certification alone.

== Release history ==
Release dates and formats for "Wide Awake"
Region	Date	Format	Label	Ref.
United States	May 22, 2012	Contemporary hit radio	Capitol	
Italy	June 8, 2012	Radio airplay	EMI	

== See also ==
- List of Billboard Dance Club Songs number ones of 2012
