= Events and festivals in Macau =

Events and festivals in Macau.

== February ==
=== Chinese New Year ===
The Chinese in Macau celebrate the same religious festivals as their counterparts in Hong Kong and other regions in Asia.

== March ==
=== Feast of the God Toutei ===
Tou Tei is the Earth God and he is said to be everywhere. Celebrations are held at the Pou Tai Un Temple on Taipa.

=== Procession of the Passion of our Lord, The Good Jesus ===
This is where a statue of Christ is paraded through the streets to the Macau Cathedral.

== April ==
=== Ching Ming or Qingming Festival ===
This Chinese tradition goes back thousands of years, and on this day, families visit the cemeteries to pay their respects and sweep the graves of their ancestors. They also burn joss sticks and paper objects, with the belief that the dead will receive these items "on the other side." Families offer roasted piglets, fruit and other food items to the deceased. The food is not wasted, for at the end of the day, there is a family feast.

=== Anniversary of 1974 Portuguese Revolution ===
This day celebrates Portugal's left-wing military coup.

=== A-Ma Festival ===
A-Ma is a Taoist goddess who is particularly revered in Macau. Also known as Tin Hau, she is the deity of fishermen and other seafarers. Legend tells of a story about a junk that, while sailing across the South China Sea, got stuck in a tremendous storm and was about to sink. All aboard were terrified, but at the last minute, a beautiful young woman stood up and ordered the elements to calm down. It did, and the junk reached land safely. This mysterious woman is none other than the goddess A-Ma. A temple was built on the spot where she landed, and it is still there to this day, on the Inner Harbour. The name Macau came to be when, many centuries later, Portuguese soldiers asked for the name of the place, the locals replied: "A-Ma-Gao" (Bay of A-Ma). It was eventually shortened to Macau. In recent times, a statue of A-Ma was erected at the highest point of Coloane Island. During the A-Ma Festival, offerings are made and there are also performances of Chinese opera.

== May ==
=== Feast of Buddha ===
The birthday of Prince Siddhartha, founder of Buddhism, is marked by devotees bathing his image. Born a prince, Siddhartha embarked on years of wandering to seek enlightenment. By resisting all temptations, he found that to attain true knowledge and peace, man had to renounce all of earthly desires and eliminate the self.

=== Feast of the Drunken Dragon ===
This is an unusual local festival that is observed by fish traders on the eighth day of the fourth moon. The festive occasion starts from Kwan Tai Temple (near Leal Senado square) where groups of intoxicated men will dance their way through markets and lanes while waving wooden dragons' heads and tails. The performance has also been interpreted as an exorcism or a fertility rite.

=== Tam Kong ===
Looked upon by fisherfolk, worshippers at the shrines of Taoist child god, Tam Kung, pray for health, wealth, calm seas, knowledge and wisdom. It was said that during the Qing Dynasty, the orphan Tam Kung who was raised by his grandmother attained extraordinary power at the age of 12, thus making him the subject of worship. He could heal the sick and control the weather. Just by tossing a handful of peas into the air, he could bring rain. And to stop a fire, he would simply throw water into the air. During this festival, Chinese opera will be staged at Coloane village where there is a temple dedicated to Tam Kung.

=== Procession of Our Lady of Fatima ===
An annual procession of devotees from S. Domingos Church to the Penha Chapel where an open-air mass is said. The event commemorates the Miracle of Fatima.

== June ==
=== Dragon Boat Festival ===
The Dragon Boat Festival is held on Nam Van Lakes. It commemorates a 3rd-century BC court adviser who drowned himself in protest against a decision by the emperor to go to war with a neighboring state. Wat Yuen was said to have left behind a beautiful poem before jumping into the river. In order to protect his body from being eaten by fish, the people quickly launched their boats, splashed the water with paddles and tossed rice dumplings into the water.

Kuan Tai is one of the major figures of Chinese history, and legend describes him as a superhero, admired by many. Several temples in the territory are dedicated to this deity, one of the most important of which is situated at Rua dos Mercadores in the Historic Centre of Macau.

On the occasion of the Feast of Kuan Tai, lion dances are enacted and Chinese opera performed in a specially constructed bamboo shed outside Kuan Tai Temple.

=== Feast of Na Cha ===
The Feast of Na Cha is usually celebrated on the eighteenth day of the fifth lunar month. There are two parades arranged: one with worship ritual with incenses in the Na Cha Temple and another called Prince Na Cha Parade. Currently, the Na Cha Temple is a part of World Heritage Monuments in the Historic Centre of Macau.

== August ==
=== Volleyball Grand Prix ===
Macau stages a section of the volleyball matches in the spacious Venetian stadium with international teams battling to qualify for the finals.

=== Feast of Maidens ===
Sometimes referred to as the Lovers' Festival, it falls on the seventh day of the seventh moon on the lunar calendar and has deep meaning for unmarried women. The festival celebrates the only day in the year when the legendary Heavenly Weaver can meet her lover, the Cowherd, over a bridge of birds spanning the Milky Way.

=== Feast of Hungry Ghosts ===
In accordance with the traditional belief that ghosts are freed from the underworld and are free to roam the world every year for a lunar month, restless spirits are appeased by burning paper and food offering by the roadsides. This festival also feature local celebrations such as Chinese opera.

== September ==
=== Mid-Autumn Festival ===
This festival is held in memory of a 14th-century uprising against the Mongols, when rebels wrote the call to revolt on pieces of paper and embedded them in cakes which were then smuggled to compatriots. Today, in commemoration of the festival, people eat special sweet cakes known as mooncake made of ground lotus and sesame. Children traditionally play with colored lanterns and watch the autumn moon rise.

=== International Fireworks Festival ===
The International Fireworks Festival is normally held around the end of September to the beginning of October. It is a unique event with experts from different countries invited to compete with firework displays.

== October ==
=== Macau International Music Festival ===
The Macau International Music Festival is an annual music festival held in Macau, with performances by artists.

=== Festival of Ancestors (Chung Yeung Festival) ===
During the Festival of Ascending Heights, or Double Ninth Festival, families offer prayers at the graves of their ancestors and climb hills in the belief that this will avoid disaster.

== November ==
=== Macau Grand Prix ===
The Macau Grand Prix is one of the biggest events in Macau's year. You'll get to see Formula 3 cars, motorcycles and saloon cars compete in this annual spectacle. The event takes place at the Guia circuit.

== December ==
=== Macau International Marathon and Macau International Half Marathon ===
Running of the International Marathon over a full course that circles the peninsula and crosses to Taipa and Coloane Islands. Runners from overseas will join hundreds of Macau and Hong Kong athletes.

=== Feast of Immaculate Conception ===
It is a traditional Christian festival with special masses. A public holiday as well.

=== Winter Solstice ===
A traditional Chinese celebration, the Winter Solstice is a public holiday as well.

== Other festivals ==
- Macau International Movie Festival (film)

== See also ==
- List of festivals in China
- List of festivals in Asia
