= Catwalk (Canadian TV series) =

Canadian musical drama television series (1992–1994)

- Genre: Musical drama
- Created by: Alan Levy
- Written by: Alison Lea Bingeman; Alan Borden; Alan Marc Levy; Frederick Rappaport; Judith and Garfield Reeves-Stevens; William A. Schwartz; Jeff Vlaming
- Directed by: Jerry Ciccoritti; Steve DiMarco; Christian Duguay; Alan Erlich; Ken Girotti; Eleanor Lindo; Jorge Montesi; Bruce Pittman; Stacey Stewart Curtis
- Starring: Lisa Butler; Neve Campbell; Christopher Lee Clements; Keram Malicki-Sanchez; Paul Popowich; Kelli Taylor
- Composers: David Hoffert; Paul Hoffert
- Country of origin: Canada
- Original language: English
- No. of seasons: 2
- No. of episodes: 49

Production
- Executive producer: Frederick Rappaport
- Producers: Tab Baird; Wendy Grean
- Cinematography: John Holosko; Richard Wincenty
- Editors: Jaime Fowler; Lisa Grootenboer
- Running time: 50 minutes
- Production companies: Lewis B. Chesler Productions; Franklin/Waterman Entertainment; King St. Entertainment; Claster Television; Camelot Entertainment Sales

Original release
- Network: YTV
- Release: October 1, 1992 – April 8, 1994

Catwalk is a Canadian musical drama television series that ran for 49 episodes on the YTV network from 1992 until 1994. The series' first season aired in syndication in the United States, while the second season aired on MTV.

== Synopsis ==
The series is based around six twenty-something adults who formed a band named Catwalk. The episodes focus on the band's personal relationships and struggles to land a record deal, while also featuring their musical performances in nightclubs. Their main gathering place is a downtown loft.

Singer/guitarist Johnnie Camden (Keram Malicki-Sanchez) is at the focal part of the show; it is in his loft where the band gathers to rehearse. Relationships are also a major part of the show; there are two couples within the cast, as Daisy (Neve Campbell) dates the group's manager Billy K., and Mary (Kelli Taylor) dates the drummer Jesse (Paul Popowich). The relationship is tumultuous and the couple broke up until the end of the first season.

The second season features a new character, Maggi (Nicole de Boer), who in the first season (in the episode "Toxic Love") became briefly involved with lead guitarist Johnnie Camden, causing tension within the band.

== Cast and characters ==
- Lisa Butler as Sierra Williams, the strong-willed lead singer. After watching Johnnie and Mary's performance, she leaves a "clue" in their audition tapes, hoping they find her. Sierra works for Master Sound Records and used to date a guy named Tyrone who is actually a separatist for black people; she would take over keyboards in addition to singing after Daisy left during the second season.
- Neve Campbell as Daisy McKenzie, the naïve keyboard player who used to date Johnnie and later ends up with Billy K. She almost married to a man named Eric, as she feels she has no one without her parents alive. She appears only in the first season.
- Christopher Lee Clements as Addie "Atlas" Robinson, the smart, tough-guy, urban rapper and dancer who used to work for Billy K to look after his aunt Ellen. He had a troubled past involving his father dying in a crossfire, with a difficulty in letting go. He appears only in the first season.
- Keram Malicki-Sanchez as Johnnie Camden, the fiercely driven leader and guitarist. He names his guitar "Watson". Johnnie moves out from his father, living in a loft with Jesse as his roommate. His mother Rita left him and his dad years ago. He appears only in the first season.
- Paul Popowich as Jesse Carlson, the band's drummer who has rebelled against his wealthy family to live on his own terms. He moves into the loft as Johnnie's roommate. He also plays guitar and piano/keyboards.
- Kelli Taylor as Mary Owens, the sensitive but tough bassist and background singer. She is a childhood friend of Johnnie's and Daisy's. In the second season, she, along with Jesse, would take control of the band after Johnnie.
- J. H. Wyman as Billy K., the band's manager, a nightclub owner with shady dealings. Billy has trouble reading due to dyslexia, as Daisy offers him her help both as tutor and girlfriend.
- David Lee Russek as Frank Cafla, an alcoholic singer with a great voice (second season only).
- Nicole de Boer as Maggie Holden, an ex-girlfriend of Johnnie's and later girlfriend for Billy K. after Daisy left. A regular in the second season, she previously appeared in a first-season episode titled "Toxic Love".
- Rob Stefaniuk as Benny Doulon, a guitarist who took Johnnie's place in the band (second season only).

=== Minor characters ===
- Victor Ertmanis as Eddie Camden: Johnnie's father who works on his boat and doesn't approve of his son in music due to carrying the harm of his wife leaving him and Johnnie. Despite this, he tries to support his son in what he loves and with the band.
- Johnie Chase and Brenda Bazinet as Joe and Julia Owens: Mary's parents who shared their likeness of music to her as a child and support her in the band.
- Jackie Richardson as Aunt Ellen Robinson: Atlas' aunt who runs a shop, who looked after him after his father died.
- Linda Griffiths as Rita: Johnnie's mother who left him and her ex-husband when Johnnie was young. She revisits to see Johnnie and explain why she left.
- Yannick Bisson as Nick: One of Mary's friends and Daisy's ex-boyfriends, who contracted HIV.
- Christina Cox as Suzie: One of Atlas' ex-girlfriends who got pregnant at a senior year. Due to child neglect, she was forced to give her up and be sent to foster care.
- Réal Andrews as Tyrone: A sound engineer who Sierra used to date. She thought he was a nice man, but is racist between blacks and whites, including towards Atlas who is a "sellout". Sierra ends up breaking up with Tyrone, when she brings Catwalk for the benefit.

== Episodes ==
=== Season 1 (1992–93) ===
| No. overall | No. in season | Title | Directed by | Written by | Original release date |
|---|---|---|---|---|---|
| 1 | 1 | "The Birth" | Eleanore Lindo | Alan Levy | 1992 |
| 2 | 2 | "The Birth" | Eleanore Lindo | Alan Levy | 1992 |
| 3 | 3 | "No Returns" | Jeff Woolnough | Alan Levy & Sarah Timberman | 1992 |
| 4 | 4 | "First Gig" | Christian Duguay | Alison Lea Bingeman | 1992 |
| 5 | 5 | "Family Business" | Alan Erlich | Lyons N. Wells | 1992 |
| 6 | 6 | "Here Today" | Jerry Ciccoritti | Nastaran Dibai | 1992 |
| 7 | 7 | "Six Hip Hoppers & Yo Babe" | Ken Girotti | Debra Epstein | 1992 |
| 8 | 8 | "Words and Music" | Jon C. Andersen | Judith and Garfield Reeves-Stevens | 1992 |
| 9 | 9 | "Life's Not Black 'n White" | Alan Erlich | Lyons N. Wells | 1992 |
| 10 | 10 | "The Gig, the Favor and the Really Big Turkey" | Allan Kroeker | Judith & Garfield Reeves-Stevens | 1992 |
| 11 | 11 | "My Girl" | Jon C. Andersen | Bill Gray | 1992 |
| 12 | 12 | "Shot in the Dark" | Ken Girotti | Durnford King | 1992 |
| 13 | 13 | "That's No Lady, That's His Wife" | Don McBrearty | Jeannie Elias | 1993 |
| 14 | 14 | "Sex, Lies and Rock n Roll" | Jorge Montesi | Judith & Garfield Reeves-Stevens | 1993 |
| 15 | 15 | "Life's Skills" | Alan Erlich | Alan Borden | 1993 |
| 16 | 16 | "Love During Wartime" | Eleanore Lindo | Lyons N. Wells | 1993 |
| 17 | 17 | "Trapped" | Jon C. Andersen | Nadine Van der Velde | 1993 |
| 18 | 18 | "Toxic Love" | Bruce Pittman | Sharon Corder & Jack Blum | 1993 |
| 19 | 19 | "Downtown" | Eleanore Lindo | Judith & Garfield Reeves-Stevens | 1993 |
| 20 | 20 | "Photo Finish" | Tab Baird | Lyons N. Wells | 1993 |
| 21 | 21 | "Mother's Day" | Bruce Pittman | Alan Levy | 1993 |
| 22 | 22 | "Flip Side" | Stacey Stewart Curtis | Judith & Garfield Reeves-Stevens | 1993 |
| 23 | 23 | "Billy's Blues" | Jerry Ciccoritti | Alan Borden | 1993 |
| 24 | 24 | "The Biggest Deal" | Eleanore Lindo | Alan Levy & Thomas George Carter | 1993 |

=== Season 2 ===
| No. overall | No. in season | Title | Directed by | Written by | Original release date |
|---|---|---|---|---|---|
| 25 | 1 | "Resurrection Blues" | Unknown | Unknown | March 4, 1994 |
| 26 | 2 | "Killing Time" | Unknown | Unknown | March 11, 1994 |
| 27 | 3 | "Do the Hustle" | Unknown | Unknown | March 18, 1994 |
| 28 | 4 | "Two-Legged Animals" | Unknown | Unknown | March 25, 1994 |
| 29 | 5 | "All Work and No Play" | Unknown | Unknown | April 1, 1994 |
| 30 | 6 | "Front and Centre" | Unknown | Unknown | April 8, 1994 |
| 31 | 7 | "Wild Thing" | TBD | TBD | 1994 |
| 32 | 8 | "All Night Long" | TBD | TBD | 1994 |
| 33 | 9 | "Just Desserts" | TBD | TBD | 1994 |
| 34 | 10 | "Truth or Consequences" | TBD | TBD | 1994 |
| 35 | 11 | "Getting What You Want" | TBD | TBD | 1994 |
| 36 | 12 | "Too Good to Be True" | TBD | TBD | 1994 |
| 37 | 13 | "Reckless to the End" | TBD | TBD | 1994 |
| 38 | 14 | "You Might Just Get What You Need" | TBD | TBD | 1994 |
| 39 | 15 | "She's Leaving Home" | TBD | TBD | 1994 |
| 40 | 16 | "Fifty Percent of Something" | TBD | TBD | 1994 |

== Music ==
The first season music was done by Rupert Gayle and Orin Isaacs. The second season on MTV was done by Steve Tyrell (The Heights and California Dreams) and his late wife, Stephanie Tyrell (also The Heights). A soundtrack from the second season was released on Atlantic Records and also featured performances, in addition to "Catwalk" (series star Lisa Butler and singer Barry Coffing as the singing role of Frank Cafla), from former The Heights star Jamie Walters, Vonda Shepard, Buffalo Tom, The Lemonheads, and Intro.

=== 1994 soundtrack ===
Catwalk: Music from the TV Series

Soundtrack album by Various
- Released: 1994
- Genres: Rock, R&B
- Language: English
- Label: Atlantic Records
- Producers: Steve Tyrell, except noted

Track listing

1. If You Want Me
2. Life is Sweet
3. I'm Allowed-Buffalo Tom (produced by The Robb Brothers with Buffalo Tom) (from the album Big Red Letter Day)
4. Drive Me-Jamie Walters (from the album Jamie Walters)
5. Let Me Off Here
6. Something to Cry About
7. Ribbon in the Sky (single edit) (cover of the song by Stevie Wonder)-Intro (produced by Nevelle Hodge) (from the album Intro)
8. Reckless (this song was later sung by Jamie Walters and appeared on an episode of Fox's Beverly Hills 90210; the Walters' version would also turn up on his second album Ride)
9. It's About Time-The Lemonheads (produced by The Robb Brothers and Evan Dando) (from the album Come On Feel The Lemonheads)
10. Love Is A Dream (featuring Vonda Shepard)
11. You Hurt Me

Tracks 1–2, 5, 8, and 11 lead vocals by Barry Coffing
Track 6 lead vocals by Lisa Butler

== Cancellation ==
The first season of Catwalk was rerun on YTV in Canada for four consecutive years. Season 1 comprised 24 episodes. The majority of the second-season episodes were never aired due to a licensing conflict between MTV Networks and the original creator of the show, Adam Kidron, and remain unseen.

== In popular culture ==
- In 1992, a Connecticut-based band also named Catwalk sued over the right to use the name.

== Award and nominations ==
| Year | Award | Category | Recipient | Result |
|---|---|---|---|---|
| 1994 | Gemini Awards | Best Performance by an Actress in a Supporting Role | Jackie Richardson | Nominated |
| 1994 | Gemini Awards | Best Direction in a Dramatic or Comedy Series | Jorge Montesi | Nominated |
| 1994 | Gemini Awards | Best Direction in a Dramatic or Comedy Series | Jerry Ciccoritti | Won |

== See also ==
- The Heights
