= List of Billboard Hot 100 chart achievements and milestones =

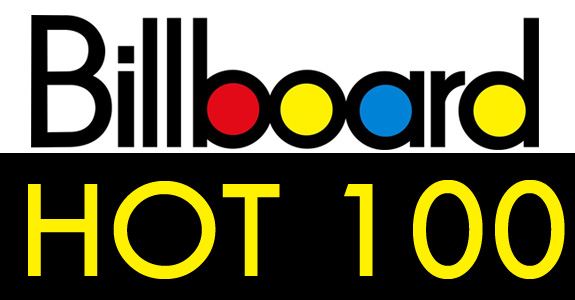

The Billboard Hot 100 is a singles chart published by Billboard that measures the most popular singles in the United States, based on sales (physical and digital), online streaming, and radio airplay. Throughout the history of the Hot 100 and its predecessor charts, many songs have set records for longevity, popularity, or number of hit singles by an individual artist.

Among these records is the longest-running number-one single, a record currently held by Ella Langley's "Choosin' Texas", spending 28 weeks at the top of the chart. The Beatles have the most number-one hits on the chart, with 20 songs having reached the top position.

Before the Hot 100's creation in 1958, Billboard published four singles charts: "Best Sellers in Stores", "Most Played by Jockeys", "Most Played in Jukeboxes", and "The Top 100". These charts, which had from 20 to 100 slots, were discontinued in 1957 and 1958. Though technically not part of the Hot 100 chart history, some data from these charts are included for computational purposes, and to avoid unenlightening or misleading characterizations.

== All-time achievements ==
In 2008, for the 50th anniversary of the Hot 100, Billboard magazine compiled a ranking of the 100 best-performing songs on the chart over the 50 years, along with the best-performing artists. In 2013, Billboard revised the rankings for the chart's 55th anniversary edition. In 2015, Billboard revised the rankings again. In 2018, the rankings were revised again for the Billboard chart's 60th anniversary. From the 2008 (50th anniversary) to the 2018 (60th anniversary) lists, Billboard ranked "The Twist" at the top all time song, with "Smooth" and "Mack the Knife" consistently in second and third, respectively. In 2021, Billboard revised the rankings again upon the ascendance of "Blinding Lights" to the top spot on the list, with the previous top three still filling out the next three positions.

=== Top 10 songs of all time (1958–2021) ===
Rank	Single	Year(s) released	Artist(s)	Peak and duration
1.	"Blinding Lights"	2019	The Weeknd	Number 1 for 4 weeks (Note: Peak position is one attribute for the "All Time Songs" list. The other attributes, all of which "Blinding Lights" holds the records for as of the 2021 update, are (with record in parenthesis): most weeks in the top five (43), top 10 (57), top 40 (86) and top 100 (90).)
2.	"The Twist"	1960, 1961 (re)	Chubby Checker	Number 1 for 3 weeks
3.	"Smooth"	1999	Santana featuring Rob Thomas	Number 1 for 12 weeks
4.	"Mack the Knife"	1959	Bobby Darin	Number 1 for 9 weeks
5.	"Uptown Funk"	2015	Mark Ronson featuring Bruno Mars	Number 1 for 14 weeks
6.	"How Do I Live"	1997	LeAnn Rimes	Number 2 for 5 weeks
7.	"Party Rock Anthem"	2011	LMFAO featuring Lauren Bennett and GoonRock	Number 1 for 6 weeks
8.	"I Gotta Feeling"	2009	The Black Eyed Peas	Number 1 for 14 weeks
9.	"Macarena (Bayside Boys Mix)"	1996	Los Del Rio	Number 1 for 14 weeks
10.	"Shape of You"	2017	Ed Sheeran	Number 1 for 12 weeks

=== Top 10 artists of all time (1958–2026) ===
Rank	Artist
1.	The Beatles
2.	Madonna
3.	Elton John
4.	Elvis Presley
5.	Mariah Carey
6.	Rihanna
7.	Taylor Swift
8.	Michael Jackson
9.	Whitney Houston
10.	Stevie Wonder

== Song milestones ==
=== Most weeks at number one ===
Number of weeks	Artist(s)	Song	Year(s)
28	Ella Langley	"Choosin' Texas"	2026
22	Mariah Carey	"All I Want for Christmas Is You"	2019–2026
19	Lil Nas X (1 week solo, 18 weeks featuring Billy Ray Cyrus)	"Old Town Road"	2019
19	Shaboozey	"A Bar Song (Tipsy)"	2024
16	Mariah Carey and Boyz II Men	"One Sweet Day"	1995–1996
16	Luis Fonsi and Daddy Yankee featuring Justin Bieber	"Despacito"	2017
16	Morgan Wallen	"Last Night"	2023
15	Harry Styles	"As It Was"	2022
14	Whitney Houston	"I Will Always Love You"	1992–1993
14	Boyz II Men	"I'll Make Love to You"	1994
14	Los del Río	"Macarena (Bayside Boys Mix)"	1996
14	Elton John	"Candle in the Wind 1997" / "Something About the Way You Look Tonight"	1997–1998
14	Mariah Carey	"We Belong Together"	2005
14	The Black Eyed Peas	"I Gotta Feeling"	2009
14	Mark Ronson featuring Bruno Mars	"Uptown Funk"	2015

Notes:

- Before the use of Nielsen SoundScan and Nielsen Broadcast Data Systems to compile the Hot 100 in 1991, the most number of weeks a single spent at number one on the Hot 100 was ten. This occurred twice, with Debby Boone's "You Light Up My Life" in 1977, and Olivia Newton-John's "Physical" in 1981–1982. Five additional singles managed nine weeks at number one during the first 34 years of the chart (1958–1992). In October 1992, the first single to top the Hot 100 for more than ten weeks was Boyz II Men's "End of the Road", which accumulated 13 weeks at number one by November 1992.

=== Progression of most weeks at number one ===
The table below highlights the progression of the songs that first hit each milestone week at number one and how long the record lasted. Songs that tied the current record at a given time are noted below the table. The current record holder is "Choosin' Texas" by Ella Langley at 28 weeks, and the longest record held is that of "One Sweet Day" by Mariah Carey and Boyz II Men with 8,554 days.

Record of longest time held
Current record

Number of weeks	Song	Artist(s)	Date achieved	Days held	Ref.
28	"Choosin' Texas"	Ella Langley	November 21, 2026	63	
27	"Choosin' Texas"	Ella Langley	November 14, 2026	63	
26	"Choosin' Texas"	Ella Langley	November 7, 2026	63	
25	"Choosin' Texas"	Ella Langley	October 31, 2026	63	
24	"Choosin' Texas"	Ella Langley	October 3, 2026	63	
23	"Choosin' Texas"	Ella Langley	September 26, 2026	63	
22	"All I Want for Christmas Is You"	Mariah Carey	January 3, 2026	281	
21	"All I Want for Christmas Is You"	Mariah Carey	December 27, 2025	281	
20	"All I Want for Christmas Is You"	Mariah Carey	December 20, 2025	281	
19	"Old Town Road"	Lil Nas X (one week solo, 18 weeks featuring Billy Ray Cyrus)	August 17, 2019	2,331	
18	"Old Town Road"	Lil Nas X (one week solo, 18 weeks featuring Billy Ray Cyrus)	August 10, 2019	2,331	
17	"Old Town Road"	Lil Nas X (one week solo, 18 weeks featuring Billy Ray Cyrus)	August 3, 2019	2,331	
16	"One Sweet Day"	Mariah Carey and Boyz II Men	March 16, 1996	8,554	
15	"One Sweet Day"	Mariah Carey and Boyz II Men	March 9, 1996	8,554	
14	"I Will Always Love You"	Whitney Houston	February 27, 1993	1,113	
13	"End of the Road"	Boyz II Men	November 7, 1992	133	
12	"End of the Road"	Boyz II Men	October 31, 1992	133	
11	"End of the Road"	Boyz II Men	October 24, 1992	133	
10	"You Light Up My Life"	Debby Boone	December 17, 1977	5,432	
9	"Mack the Knife"	Bobby Darin	December 7, 1959	6,606	
8	"Mack the Knife"	Bobby Darin	November 30, 1959	6,606	
7	"Mack the Knife"	Bobby Darin	November 23, 1959	6,606	
6	"It's All in the Game"	Tommy Edwards	November 3, 1958	392	
5	"Volare (Nel blu dipinto di blu)"	Domenico Modugno	September 22, 1958	63	
4	"Volare (Nel blu dipinto di blu)"	Domenico Modugno	September 15, 1958	63	
3	"Volare (Nel blu dipinto di blu)"	Domenico Modugno	September 8, 1958	63	
2	"Poor Little Fool"	Ricky Nelson	August 11, 1958	35	
1	"Poor Little Fool"	Ricky Nelson	August 4, 1958	35	
As of the chart dated September 26, 2026

- Note: "The Battle of New Orleans" by Johnny Horton tied the record for 6 weeks at number one on July 6, 1959.
- Note: "Theme from A Summer Place" by Percy Faith tied the record for 9 weeks at number one on April 18, 1960.
- Note: "Hey Jude" by the Beatles tied the record for 9 weeks at number one on November 23, 1968.
- Note: "Physical" by Olivia Newton-John tied the record for 10 weeks at number one on January 23, 1982.
- Note: "I'll Make Love to You" by Boyz II Men tied the record for 14 weeks at number one on November 26, 1994.
- Note: "Despacito" by Luis Fonsi and Daddy Yankee featuring Justin Bieber tied the record for 16 weeks at number one on September 9, 2017.
- Note: "A Bar Song (Tipsy)" by Shaboozey tied the record for 19 weeks at number one on November 30, 2024.

=== Most weeks at number two ===
Number of weeks	Artist(s)	Song	Year(s)	Weeks at number one	Ref.
17	Brenda Lee	"Rockin' Around the Christmas Tree"	2019–2026	3	
14	The Kid Laroi and Justin Bieber	"Stay"	2021–2022	7	
13	Alex Warren	"Ordinary"	2025–2026	10	
12	Post Malone featuring Morgan Wallen	"I Had Some Help"	2024	6	
12	Lady Gaga and Bruno Mars	"Die with a Smile"	2024–2025	5	
12	Ella Langley	"Choosin' Texas"	2026	28	
11	Whitney Houston	"Exhale (Shoop Shoop)"	1995–1996	1	
11	Olivia Rodrigo	"Good 4 U"	2021	1	
11	SZA	"Kill Bill"	2023	1	
10	Foreigner	"Waiting for a Girl Like You"	1981–1982	0	
10	Silk	"Freak Me"	1993	2	
10	Missy Elliott	"Work It"	2002–2003	0	
10	Bruno Mars	"That's What I Like"	2017	1	
10	Billie Eilish	"Bad Guy"	2019	1	
10	Harry Styles	"As It Was"	2022	15	
10	Huntrix: Ejae, Audrey Nuna and Rei Ami	"Golden"	2025–2026	8	

- "Bad Guy" by Billie Eilish and "Rockin' Around the Christmas Tree" by Brenda Lee share the record for most weeks at number 2 before topping the chart, with nine weeks each.

==== Without hitting number one ====
Number of weeks	Artist(s)	Song	Year(s)	Kept out of number-one position by	Ref.
10	Foreigner	"Waiting for a Girl Like You"	1981–82	"Physical" (Olivia Newton-John), "I Can't Go for That (No Can Do)" (Hall & Oates)	
10	Missy Elliott	"Work It"	2002–03	"Lose Yourself" (Eminem)	
9	Donna Lewis	"I Love You Always Forever"	1996	"Macarena (Bayside Boys Mix)" (Los del Río)	
9	Shania Twain	"You're Still the One"	1998	"Too Close" (Next), "The Boy Is Mine" (Brandy and Monica)	
8	Shai	"If I Ever Fall in Love"	1992–93	"How Do You Talk to an Angel" (The Heights), "I Will Always Love You" (Whitney Houston)	
8	Deborah Cox	"Nobody's Supposed to Be Here"	1998–99	"I'm Your Angel" (R. Kelly and Celine Dion), "Have You Ever?" (Brandy)	
8	Brian McKnight	"Back at One"	1999–2000	"Smooth" (Santana featuring Rob Thomas)	
8	Mario Winans featuring Enya and P. Diddy	"I Don't Wanna Know"	2004	"Yeah!" (Usher featuring Lil Jon and Ludacris), "Burn" (Usher)	
8	Ed Sheeran	"Thinking Out Loud"	2015	"Uptown Funk" (Mark Ronson featuring Bruno Mars)	
8	Future featuring Drake	"Life Is Good"	2020	"The Box" (Roddy Ricch)	
8	Luke Combs	"Fast Car"	2023	"Last Night" (Morgan Wallen), "Rich Men North of Richmond" (Oliver Anthony Music), "I Remember Everything" (Zach Bryan featuring Kacey Musgraves)	

=== Most total weeks in the top two ===
Number of weeks	Artist(s)	Song	Year(s)	Ref.
40	Ella Langley	"Choosin' Texas"	2026	
29	Mariah Carey	"All I Want for Christmas Is You"	2019–26	
25	Harry Styles	"As It Was"	2022	
24	Shaboozey	"A Bar Song (Tipsy)"	2024–25	
23	Alex Warren	"Ordinary"	2025–26	
21	The Kid Laroi and Justin Bieber	"Stay"	2021–22	
21	Morgan Wallen	"Last Night"	2023	
20	Brenda Lee	"Rockin' Around the Christmas Tree"	2019–26	
19	Lil Nas X (one week solo, 18 weeks featuring Billy Ray Cyrus)	"Old Town Road"	2019	
18	Mark Ronson featuring Bruno Mars	"Uptown Funk"	2015	
18	Post Malone featuring Morgan Wallen	"I Had Some Help"	2024	
18	Huntrix: Ejae, Audrey Nuna and Rei Ami	"Golden"	2025–26	

=== Most total weeks in the top three ===
Number of weeks	Artist(s)	Song	Year(s)	Ref.
40	Ella Langley	"Choosin' Texas"	2026	
33	Alex Warren	"Ordinary"	2025–26	
32	Mariah Carey	"All I Want for Christmas Is You"	2019–26	
29	Harry Styles	"As It Was"	2022	
28	Brenda Lee	"Rockin' Around the Christmas Tree"	2019–26	
27	Shaboozey	"A Bar Song (Tipsy)"	2024–25	
26	Morgan Wallen	"Last Night"	2023	
24	Lady Gaga and Bruno Mars	"Die with a Smile"	2024–25	
23	The Kid Laroi and Justin Bieber	"Stay"	2021–22	
22	Miley Cyrus	"Flowers"	2023	

=== Most total weeks in the top five ===
Number of weeks	Artist(s)	Song	Year(s)	Ref.
47	Shaboozey	"A Bar Song (Tipsy)"	2024–25	
46	Alex Warren	"Ordinary"	2025–26	
44	Ella Langley	"Choosin' Texas"	2026	
43	The Weeknd	"Blinding Lights"	2020–21	
35	Mariah Carey	"All I Want for Christmas Is You"	2019–26	
34	The Kid Laroi and Justin Bieber	"Stay"	2021–22	
31	Harry Styles	"As It Was"	2022	
31	Morgan Wallen	"Last Night"	2023	
31	Lady Gaga and Bruno Mars	"Die with a Smile"	2024–25	
30	Brenda Lee	"Rockin' Around the Christmas Tree"	2019–26	

=== Most total weeks in the top ten ===
Number of weeks	Artist(s)	Song	Year(s)	Ref.
80	Teddy Swims	"Lose Control"	2024–25	
66	Shaboozey	"A Bar Song (Tipsy)"	2024–25	
57	The Weeknd	"Blinding Lights"	2020–21	
54	Alex Warren	"Ordinary"	2025–26	
51	Lady Gaga and Bruno Mars	"Die with a Smile"	2024–25	
46	Ella Langley	"Choosin' Texas"	2026	
44	The Kid Laroi and Justin Bieber	"Stay"	2021–22	
43	Mariah Carey	"All I Want for Christmas Is You"	2017–26	
43	Olivia Dean	"Man I Need"	2025–26	
42	Benson Boone	"Beautiful Things"	2024–25	

=== Most total weeks on the Hot 100 ===
==== Non-holiday songs ====
Below are songs not connected to Christmas or the holiday season. (A special section for the holiday songs is below, as several of those songs re-enter the Hot 100 each holiday season.) On October 20, 2025, Billboard updated the rules of its charts, disqualifying any song with more than 52 weeks that was no longer in the top ten. As a result, all future entries except for holiday singles will be affected.

Number of weeks	Artist(s)	Song	Year entered	Year departed	Ref.
112	Teddy Swims	"Lose Control"	2023	2025	
91	Glass Animals	"Heat Waves"	2021	2022	
90	The Weeknd	"Blinding Lights"	2019	2021	
89	Benson Boone	"Beautiful Things"	2024	2025	
87	Imagine Dragons	"Radioactive"	2012	2014	
79	Awolnation	"Sail"	2011	2014	
77	Dua Lipa (45 weeks featuring DaBaby, 32 weeks solo)	"Levitating"	2020	2022	
77	Shaboozey	"A Bar Song (Tipsy)"	2024	2025	
76	Jason Mraz	"I'm Yours"	2008	2009	
72	Billie Eilish	"Wildflower"	2024	2025	

==== Holiday songs ====
During November and December beginning in the 2010s, these songs have regularly appeared on the Hot 100, generally departing from the chart once the holiday season ends in early January.

Number of weeks	Artist(s)	Song	Year entered	Ref.
81	Mariah Carey	"All I Want for Christmas Is You"	2000	
72	Brenda Lee	"Rockin' Around the Christmas Tree"	1960	
69	Bobby Helms	"Jingle Bell Rock"	1958	
56	Nat King Cole	"The Christmas Song"	1960	
55	Wham!	"Last Christmas"	2017	
53	Andy Williams	"It's the Most Wonderful Time of the Year"	2017	
51	Burl Ives	"A Holly Jolly Christmas"	2017	
44	Bing Crosby	"White Christmas"	1958	
43	José Feliciano	"Feliz Navidad"	2017	
42	Dean Martin	"Let It Snow! Let It Snow! Let It Snow!"	2018	

=== Biggest jump to number one ===
Chart movement	Artist(s)	Song	Date	Ref.
97–1	Kelly Clarkson	"My Life Would Suck Without You"	February 7, 2009	
96–1	Britney Spears	"Womanizer"	October 25, 2008	
80–1	T.I. featuring Rihanna	"Live Your Life"	October 18, 2008	
78–1	Eminem, Dr. Dre and 50 Cent	"Crack a Bottle"	February 21, 2009	
77–1	Taylor Swift	"Look What You Made Me Do"	September 16, 2017	
72–1	Taylor Swift	"We Are Never Ever Getting Back Together"	September 1, 2012	
71–1	T.I.	"Whatever You Like"	September 6, 2008	
68–1	Adele	"Easy on Me"	October 30, 2021	
64–1	Maroon 5	"Makes Me Wonder"	May 12, 2007	
60–1	Rihanna featuring Drake	"What's My Name?"	November 20, 2010	

Changes in when the eligibility of a single first begins, as well as more accurate digital download totals, have made abrupt chart jumps more commonplace. From 1955 to 2001, under Billboard's previous methodologies, only two singles directly charted to number one from a previous position outside of the Top 20: The Beatles' "Can't Buy Me Love", which jumped from number 27 to the top slot in April 1964, and Brandy and Monica's "The Boy Is Mine" which jumped from number 23 to number one in June 1998.

=== Biggest single-week upward movements ===
Number of positions	Chart movement	Artist(s)	Song	Date	Ref.
98	100–2	Taylor Swift featuring Brendon Urie	"Me!"	May 11, 2019	
96	97–1	Kelly Clarkson	"My Life Would Suck Without You"	February 7, 2009	
95	96–1	Britney Spears	"Womanizer"	October 25, 2008	
92	94–2	Billie Eilish	"Therefore I Am"	November 28, 2020	
91	94–3	Beyoncé and Shakira	"Beautiful Liar"	April 7, 2007	
90	94–4	Maroon 5 featuring Cardi B	"Girls Like You"	June 16, 2018	
88	95–7	Akon featuring Eminem	"Smack That"	October 14, 2006	
88	97–9	Drake featuring Nicki Minaj	"Make Me Proud"	November 5, 2011	
85	96–11	Carrie Underwood	"Cowboy Casanova"	October 10, 2009	
85	100–15	A. R. Rahman and Pussycat Dolls featuring Nicole Scherzinger	"Jai Ho! (You Are My Destiny)"	March 14, 2009	

Under Billboard's previous methodologies, jumps of this magnitude were rare. One exception was Jeannie C. Riley's "Harper Valley PTA," which advanced 74 slots in August 1968; this upward acceleration went unmatched for 30 years, until Shanice's song "When I Close My Eyes" (1999) advanced 75 slots from number 91 to number 16 in April 1999. Changes in when the eligibility of a single first begins, as well as more accurate digital download totals, have made abrupt chart jumps more commonplace.

=== Longest climbs to number one ===
Week	Artist(s)	Song	Debut date	Date reaching number one	Ref.
59	Glass Animals	"Heat Waves"^{†}	January 16, 2021	March 12, 2022	
54	Brenda Lee	"Rockin' Around the Christmas Tree"^{†}	December 12, 1960	December 9, 2023	
35	Mariah Carey	"All I Want for Christmas Is You"^{†}	January 8, 2000	December 21, 2019	
33	Los del Río	"Macarena (Bayside Boys Mix)"^{†}	September 2, 1995	August 3, 1996	
32	Teddy Swims	"Lose Control"	August 26, 2023	March 30, 2024	
31	Lonestar	"Amazed"^{†}	June 5, 1999	March 4, 2000	
31	The Weeknd and Ariana Grande	"Die for You"^{†}	December 17, 2016	March 11, 2023	
30	John Legend	"All of Me"^{†}	September 21, 2013	May 17, 2014	
27	Creed	"With Arms Wide Open"	May 13, 2000	November 11, 2000	
26	Vertical Horizon	"Everything You Want"	January 22, 2000	July 15, 2000	

† – Non-consecutive weeks on the Hot 100 before it was ranked number one

- Note: Ariana Grande was added to the artist credits on "Die for You" the week the song reached number one, as a remix of the song featuring Grande had been released and counted for the first time.

=== Biggest drop from number one ===
This list does not include titles which have dropped from number 1 off the Hot 100 altogether; see the Holiday songs section below.

Chart movement	Artist(s)	Song	Date	Ref.
1–57	Travis Scott	"4x4"	February 15, 2025	
1–45	Jimin	"Like Crazy"	April 15, 2023	
1–38	Taylor Swift	"Willow"	January 2, 2021	
1–34	6ix9ine and Nicki Minaj	"Trollz"	July 4, 2020	
1–28	BTS	"Life Goes On"	December 12, 2020	
1–25	Travis Scott featuring Young Thug and M.I.A.	"Franchise"	October 17, 2020	
1–21	Jason Aldean	"Try That in a Small Town"	August 12, 2023	
1–17	The Weeknd	"Heartless"	December 21, 2019	
1–17	BTS	"Butter"	September 18, 2021	
1–16	Hozier	"Too Sweet"	May 4, 2024	

Prior to December 2019, the biggest drop from number one was shared by two songs that were back-to-back number ones in October 1974, both dropping from number one to number 15: "Nothing from Nothing" by Billy Preston, and "Then Came You" by Dionne Warwick and the Spinners. That record held for more than 45 years.

=== Biggest single-week downward movements ===
Number of positions	Chart movement	Artist(s)	Song	Date	Ref.
81	16–97	Kendrick Lamar and Taylour Paige	"We Cry Together"	June 4, 2022	
81	13–94	Drake	"Texts Go Green"	July 9, 2022	
80	19–99	ASAP Ferg featuring Nicki Minaj and MadeinTYO	"Move Ya Hips"	August 22, 2020	
79	17–96	Javier Colon	"Stitch by Stitch"	July 23, 2011	
78	21–99	Jordan Smith	"Somebody to Love"	January 2, 2016	
77	20–97	J. Cole	"Punchin' the Clock"	June 5, 2021	
77	16–93	5 Seconds of Summer	"Amnesia"	July 26, 2014	
75	17–92	Justin Bieber	"Die in Your Arms"	June 23, 2012	
74	25–99	J. Cole	"The Climb Back"	June 5, 2021	
74	17–91	Lil Wayne	"Can't Be Broken"	October 20, 2018	

=== Biggest drops off the Hot 100 ===
==== Non-holiday songs ====
Below are songs not connected to Christmas or the holiday season. (A separate section for the holiday songs is listed below, as some of those songs set higher records for departing the Hot 100 starting in early 2019 and 2020.)

Chart movement	Artist(s)	Song	Date	Ref.
4–Off	Prince and The Revolution	"Purple Rain"^{††}	May 21, 2016	
6–Off	J. Cole	"7 Minute Drill"	April 27, 2024	
6–Off	Alex Warren	"Ordinary"	May 30, 2026	
7–Off	Olivia Dean	"So Easy (To Fall in Love)"	October 10, 2026	
8–Off	Prince	"When Doves Cry"^{††}	May 21, 2016	
8–Off	Olivia Dean	"Man I Need"	October 10, 2026	
9–Off	Soko	"We Might Be Dead by Tomorrow"	April 5, 2014	
10–Off	Rema and Selena Gomez	"Calm Down"	October 21, 2023	
11–Off	Jonas Brothers	"A Little Bit Longer"	August 30, 2008	
11–Off	Taylor Swift	"Mean"	November 13, 2010	
11–Off	One Direction	"Diana"	December 14, 2013	
11–Off	Taylor Swift	"Love Story (Taylor's Version)"	March 6, 2021	
11–Off	Toby Keith	"Courtesy of the Red, White and Blue (The Angry American)"	July 25, 2026	

†† – "Purple Rain" and "When Doves Cry" reappeared on the Hot 100 for two weeks after Prince's death in 2016, and the above reflects their re-entries only. On their original releases, in their respective last weeks before falling off the chart, "When Doves Cry" ranked number 96 in October 1984, and "Purple Rain" ranked number 91 in January 1985.

Prior to 2008, the biggest drop off the Hot 100 was "Nights in White Satin" by The Moody Blues, which ranked at number 17 in its final week on the chart in December 1972. This high drop-off position was matched in January 1975 by "Junior's Farm" by Paul McCartney and Wings. The record descent held for over three decades. With the exceptions of "Calm Down", "Ordinary", "Man I Need" and "So Easy", most of the songs above left the Hot 100 after four or fewer weeks; "Nights in White Satin" and "Junior's Farm" departed after 18 and 12 weeks, respectively.

==== Holiday songs ====
During November and December beginning in the 2010s, these songs have regularly appeared on the Hot 100, generally departing from the chart once the holiday season ends in January. Some of them have reached into the top ten, and in 2019, for only the second time in the Hot 100's history (the first since 1958), made it to number one. This led to all-time records for dropping off the Hot 100, including from number one, as the songs depart regardless of their final chart positions during the season. Only the highest drop-off position per song is listed and its most recent date if achieved more than once, such as "All I Want for Christmas Is You", which first dropped off the Hot 100 from number one on January 11, 2020, and has done so several times since.

A similar seasonal pattern has emerged for Halloween music, which experiences a sharp surge every tracking week of Halloween. Most notably, Michael Jackson's "Thriller" achieved a major milestone when it returned to the top ten in 2025, marking its first top-ten appearance since 1984. Like holiday music, Halloween tracks typically depart once the season ends.

Chart movement	Artist(s)	Song	Date	Ref.
1–Off	Mariah Carey	"All I Want for Christmas Is You"	January 10, 2026	
1–Off	Brenda Lee	"Rockin' Around the Christmas Tree"	January 13, 2024	
2–Off	Michael Jackson	"Thriller"	November 21, 2026	
3–Off	Bobby Helms	"Jingle Bell Rock"	January 10, 2026	
3–Off	Wham!	"Last Christmas"	January 11, 2025	
4–Off	Burl Ives	"A Holly Jolly Christmas"	January 11, 2020	
5–Off	Ariana Grande	"Santa Tell Me"	January 10, 2026	
6–Off	Andy Williams	"It's the Most Wonderful Time of the Year"	January 13, 2024	
6–Off	Nat King Cole	"The Christmas Song"	January 10, 2026	
7–Off	José Feliciano	"Feliz Navidad"	January 14, 2023	
7–Off	Dean Martin	"Let it Snow, Let it Snow, Let it Snow"	January 10, 2026	

=== Songs charting every week for a given calendar year on the Hot 100 ===
There have been a few songs that charted more than 52 weeks throughout their runs, but only five songs have managed to chart on the Hot 100 every week within a given calendar year. The first to accomplish such a milestone was Jewel's "You Were Meant for Me" charting each week of 1997.

Year	Song	Artist(s)	Total weeks charted	Ref.
1997	"You Were Meant for Me" / "Foolish Games"	Jewel	65	
2013	"Radioactive"	Imagine Dragons	87	
2020	"Blinding Lights"	The Weeknd	90	
2023	"Snooze"	SZA	70	
2024	"Lose Control"	Teddy Swims	112	

- Note - Jewel's "Foolish Games" began appearing on the Hot 100 in September 1997, but was paired with "You Were Meant for Me" for the remainder of that song's chart run.
- Note - Dua Lipa's "Levitating" (solo or with DaBaby) charted every week of 2021 through December 4, 2021, and most likely could have charted all 52 weeks despite Billboard's recurrent rules. For the remaining three weeks of 2021, the song charted at number one on Billboard's recurrent chart, due to holiday songs taking the majority of the Hot 100 and caused many non-holiday songs off the chart. Once the holiday season ended, "Levitating" returned to the Hot 100 in early January 2022.
- Note - SZA's "Kill Bill" charted every week of 2023 through December 2, 2023, and most likely could have charted all 52 weeks despite Billboard's recurrent rules, due to holiday songs taking the majority of the Hot 100 and causing many non-holiday songs off the chart. Once the holiday season ended, "Kill Bill" returned to the Hot 100 in early January 2024.

=== Holiday top-ten hits ===
Sixteen total top-ten hits, as of January 3, 2026.

Top-ten initial entry date	Single	Artist(s)	Peak	Peak date	Weeks in top-ten
December 20, 1958	"The Chipmunk Song (Christmas Don't Be Late)"	The Chipmunks with David Seville	1	December 27, 1958	6
December 23, 1989	"This One's for the Children"	New Kids on the Block	7	January 6, 1990	4
January 8, 2000	"Auld Lang Syne"	Kenny G	7	January 8, 2000	2
December 30, 2017	"All I Want for Christmas Is You"	Mariah Carey	1	December 21, 2019	43
December 29, 2018	"It's the Most Wonderful Time of the Year"	Andy Williams	5	January 2, 2021	24
January 5, 2019	"Jingle Bell Rock"	Bobby Helms	2	December 27, 2025	32
January 5, 2019	"Rockin' Around the Christmas Tree"	Brenda Lee	1	December 9, 2023	35
January 5, 2019	"A Holly Jolly Christmas"	Burl Ives	4	January 4, 2020	26
December 19, 2020	"Feliz Navidad"	José Feliciano	6	January 2, 2021	9
January 2, 2021	"Let It Snow! Let It Snow! Let It Snow!"	Dean Martin	7	January 6, 2024	8
January 2, 2021	"Last Christmas"	Wham!	2	December 13, 2025	22
January 2, 2021	"Run Rudolph Run"	Chuck Berry	10	January 2, 2021	1
January 1, 2022	"Sleigh Ride"	The Ronettes	8	December 23, 2023	5
January 7, 2023	"The Christmas Song (Merry Christmas to You)"	Nat King Cole	6	December 27, 2025	6
December 28, 2024	"Santa Tell Me"	Ariana Grande	5	January 4, 2025	6
December 28, 2024	"Underneath the Tree"	Kelly Clarkson	7	December 27, 2025	5

=== Songs hitting number one for different artists ===
- "Go Away Little Girl" – Steve Lawrence (1963) and Donny Osmond (1971)
- "The Loco-Motion" – Little Eva (1962) and Grand Funk (1974)
- "Please Mr. Postman" – The Marvelettes (1961) and The Carpenters (1975)
- "Venus" – Shocking Blue (1970) and Bananarama (1986)
- "Lean on Me" – Bill Withers (1972) and Club Nouveau (1987)
- "You Keep Me Hangin' On" – The Supremes (1966) and Kim Wilde (1987)
- "When a Man Loves a Woman" – Percy Sledge (1966) and Michael Bolton (1991)
- "I'll Be There" – The Jackson 5 (1970) and Mariah Carey (1992)
- "Lady Marmalade" – Labelle (1975) and Christina Aguilera / Lil' Kim / Mýa / Pink (2001)

=== Non-English language number-ones ===
- "Nel Blu Dipinto Di Blu (Volare)" – Domenico Modugno (Italian – August 18, 1958, for five non-consecutive weeks)
- "Sukiyaki" – Kyu Sakamoto (Japanese – June 15, 1963, for three weeks)
- "Dominique" – The Singing Nun (French – December 7, 1963, for four weeks)
- "Rock Me Amadeus" – Falco (English/German – March 29, 1986, for three weeks)
- "La Bamba" – Los Lobos (Spanish – August 29, 1987, for three weeks)
- "Macarena (Bayside Boys Mix)" – Los del Río (English/Spanish – August 3, 1996, for fourteen weeks)
- "Despacito" – Luis Fonsi and Daddy Yankee featuring Justin Bieber (English/Spanish – May 27, 2017, for sixteen weeks)
- "Life Goes On" – BTS (Korean/English – December 5, 2020, for one week)
- "Like Crazy" – Jimin (Korean/English – April 8, 2023, for one week)
- "DTMF" – Bad Bunny (Spanish – February 21, 2026, for one week)

=== Instrumental number-ones ===
- "The Happy Organ" – Dave "Baby" Cortez (May 11, 1959, for one week)
- "Sleep Walk" – Santo & Johnny (September 21, 1959, for two weeks)
- "Theme from A Summer Place" – Percy Faith (February 22, 1960, for nine weeks)
- "Wonderland by Night" – Bert Kaempfert (January 9, 1961, for three weeks)
- "Calcutta" – Lawrence Welk (February 13, 1961, for two weeks)
- "Stranger on the Shore" – Mr. Acker Bilk (May 26, 1962, for one week; also first number-one for a British artist on the Hot 100)
- "The Stripper" – David Rose (July 7, 1962, for one week)
- "Telstar" – The Tornados (December 22, 1962, for three weeks)
- "Love Is Blue" – Paul Mauriat (February 10, 1968, for five weeks)
- "Grazing in the Grass" – Hugh Masekela (July 20, 1968, for two weeks)
- "Love Theme from Romeo and Juliet" – Henry Mancini (June 28, 1969, for two weeks)
- "Frankenstein" – The Edgar Winter Group (May 26, 1973, for one week)
- "Love's Theme" – Love Unlimited Orchestra (February 9, 1974, for one week)
- "TSOP (The Sound of Philadelphia)"^{†} – MFSB and The Three Degrees (April 20, 1974, for two weeks)
- "Pick Up the Pieces"^{†} – Average White Band (February 22, 1975, for one week)
- "The Hustle"^{†} – Van McCoy and the Soul City Symphony (July 26, 1975, for one week)
- "Fly, Robin, Fly"^{†} – Silver Convention (November 29, 1975, for three weeks)
- "Theme from S.W.A.T." – Rhythm Heritage (February 28, 1976, for one week)
- "A Fifth of Beethoven" – Walter Murphy and the Big Apple Band (October 9, 1976, for one week)
- "Gonna Fly Now"^{†} – Bill Conti (July 2, 1977, for one week)
- "Star Wars Theme/Cantina Band" – Meco (October 1, 1977, for two weeks)
- "Rise" – Herb Alpert (October 20, 1979, for two weeks)
- "Chariots of Fire" – Vangelis (May 8, 1982, for one week)
- "Miami Vice Theme" – Jan Hammer (November 9, 1985, for one week)
- "Harlem Shake"^{†} – Baauer (March 2, 2013, for five weeks)

† – Contains vocal part, but is considered an instrumental. See Instrumental § Borderline cases for more.

=== Live version number-ones ===
A "live version" would be the piece of music performed live (usually in front of an audience) and its cut single from the live album charted. It could also be a re-recording of the music being performed "live" and unplugged with audience that can be heard in the song clapping, cheering or chanting. Only eight live songs managed to hit number one compared to its studio versions.

- "Fingertips" – Little Stevie Wonder (August 10, 1963, for three weeks)
- "My Ding-a-Ling" – Chuck Berry (October 21, 1972, for two weeks)
- "Thank God I'm a Country Boy" – John Denver (June 7, 1975, for one week)
- "Coming Up" (Live at Glasgow) – Paul McCartney and Wings (June 28, 1980, for three weeks)
- "At This Moment" – Billy Vera and the Beaters (January 24, 1987, for two weeks)
- "Mony Mony" – Billy Idol (November 21, 1987, for one week)
- "Don't Let the Sun Go Down On Me" – George Michael and Elton John (February 1, 1992, for one week)
- "I'll Be There" – Mariah Carey (June 20, 1992, for three weeks)

=== All-female collaborations to reach number one ===
- "No More Tears (Enough Is Enough)" – Barbra Streisand and Donna Summer (November 24, 1979)
- "The Boy Is Mine" – Brandy and Monica (June 6, 1998)
- "Lady Marmalade" – Christina Aguilera, Lil' Kim, Mýa and Pink (June 2, 2001)
- "S&M" – Rihanna featuring Britney Spears (April 30, 2011)
- "Fancy" – Iggy Azalea featuring Charli XCX (June 7, 2014)
- "Say So" – Doja Cat featuring Nicki Minaj (May 16, 2020)
- "Savage" – Megan Thee Stallion featuring Beyoncé (May 30, 2020)
- "Rain on Me" – Lady Gaga and Ariana Grande (June 6, 2020)
- "WAP" – Cardi B featuring Megan Thee Stallion (August 22, 2020)
- "Golden" – Huntrix: Ejae, Audrey Nuna and Rei Ami (August 16, 2025)

† – "Rain on Me" marked the first all-female collaboration to debut atop the chart

=== Number-ones from animated film soundtracks ===
- "A Whole New World" – Peabo Bryson and Regina Belle (Aladdin – March 6, 1993, for one week)
- "Happy" – Pharrell Williams (Despicable Me 2 – March 8, 2014, for ten weeks)
- "Can't Stop the Feeling!" – Justin Timberlake (Trolls – May 28, 2016, for one week)
- "Sunflower" – Post Malone and Swae Lee (Spider-Man: Into the Spider-Verse – January 19, 2019, for one week)
- "We Don't Talk About Bruno" – Carolina Gaitán, Mauro Castillo, Adassa, Rhenzy Feliz, Diane Guerrero, Stephanie Beatriz and the Encanto cast (Encanto – February 5, 2022, for five weeks)
- "Golden" – Huntrix: Ejae, Audrey Nuna and Rei Ami (KPop Demon Hunters – August 16, 2025, for eight non-consecutive weeks)
- "I Knew It, I Knew You" – Taylor Swift (Toy Story 5 – June 20, 2026, for two weeks)

=== Length records ===
- The shortest number-one song of all time is "Stay" by Maurice Williams And The Zodiacs (November 21, 1960). It is 1 minute and 38 seconds long.
- The longest number-one song of all time is "All Too Well (Taylor's Version)" by Taylor Swift (November 27, 2021). It is 10 minutes and 13 seconds long.
- The number-one song with the longest title contains 41 words and topped the charts for Stars on 45 in June 1981. Though DJs announced it as the Stars on 45 Medley, its official title is "Medley: Intro 'Venus' / Sugar Sugar / No Reply / I'll Be Back / Drive My Car / Do You Want to Know a Secret / We Can Work It Out / I Should Have Known Better / Nowhere Man / You're Going to Lose That Girl / Stars on 45."
- The number-one song with the shortest title is "3" by Britney Spears.
- André 3000's "I Swear, I Really Wanted to Make a 'Rap' Album but This Is Literally the Way the Wind Blew Me This Time" is the longest song to chart on the Hot 100 (number 90), at 12:20.
- Jack Black's "Steve's Lava Chicken" is the shortest song to chart on the Hot 100 (number 78), at 34 seconds.

== Artist achievements ==
=== Most number-one songs ===
Number of songs	Artist	Ref.
20	The Beatles	
19	Mariah Carey	
17	Elvis Presley^{‡}	
16	Taylor Swift	
14	Rihanna	
14	Drake^{††}	
13	Michael Jackson	
12	The Supremes	
12	Madonna	
11	Whitney Houston	

‡ – Pre-Hot 100 charts and Hot 100.

- Billboard credits the dual number-one Presley single "Don't Be Cruel"/"Hound Dog" as a single chart entity, and credits Presley with 17 number one singles. "Don't Be Cruel"/"Hound Dog" spent 11 weeks at number one, "Hound Dog" for 6 weeks, and "Don't Be Cruel" for 5 weeks. Many chart statisticians, however, such as Joel Whitburn, still list Presley as having 18 number ones. If counting only entries after the creation of Billboard Hot 100, Presley has seven number-one singles on the chart.
- If counting Drake's uncredited feature on Travis Scott's "Sicko Mode", then he would have 15 total number ones.

=== Most cumulative weeks at number one ===
Weeks at number one	Artist	Ref.
101	Mariah Carey	
79	Elvis Presley^{†}	
60	Rihanna	
59	The Beatles	
57	Drake	
52	Taylor Swift	
50	Boyz II Men	
47	Usher	
46	Beyoncé	
42	Bruno Mars	

† – Pre-Hot 100 charts and Hot 100. Presley is sometimes credited with an "80th week" that occurred when "All Shook Up" spent a ninth week on top of the "Most Played in Jukeboxes" chart. Although Billboard's chart statistician Joel Whitburn still counts this 80th week based on preexisting research, Billboard magazine itself has since revised its methodology and officially credits Presley with 79 weeks. Much of Presley's total factors in pre-Hot 100 data. If counting from the August 1958 Hot 100 inception, Presley totaled 22 weeks at number one.

- Note: For singer Michael Jackson, if The Jackson 5, which would also be later known as The Jacksons, is included, this would give Michael Jackson 47 cumulative weeks at number one.
- Note: For singer Beyoncé, if Destiny's Child is included, this would give Beyoncé 63 cumulative weeks at number one.
- Note: For singer Diana Ross, if The Supremes are included, this would give Diana Ross 42 cumulative weeks at number one.
- Note: For each of the Beatles:
  - If John Lennon's total weeks were to include the Beatles, this would give John Lennon 65 cumulative weeks at number one.
  - If Paul McCartney's total weeks were to include the Beatles, as well as Wings, this would give Paul McCartney 89 cumulative weeks at number one.
  - If George Harrison's total weeks were to include the Beatles, this would give George Harrison 65 cumulative weeks at number one.
  - If Ringo Starr's total weeks were to include the Beatles, this would give Ringo Starr 61 cumulative weeks at number one.
- Note: For rapper Drake, if the track "Sicko Mode" is included, this would give him 58 weeks at number one.

=== Most consecutive number-one songs ===
Number of songs	Artist	First hit and date	Final hit and date	Streak-breaking song
7	Whitney Houston	"Saving All My Love for You" (October 26, 1985)	"Where Do Broken Hearts Go" (April 23, 1988)	"Love Will Save the Day" (Number 9 – August 27, 1988)
6	The Beatles	"I Feel Fine" (December 26, 1964)	"We Can Work It Out" (January 8, 1966)	"Nowhere Man" (Number 3 – March 26, 1966)
6	Bee Gees	"How Deep Is Your Love" (December 24, 1977)	"Love You Inside Out" (June 9, 1979)	"He's A Liar" (Number 30 – October 24, 1981)
5	Elvis Presley	"A Big Hunk o' Love" (August 10, 1959)	"Surrender" (March 20, 1961)	"I Feel So Bad" (Number 5 – May 1961)
5	The Supremes	"Where Did Our Love Go" (August 22, 1964)	"Back in My Arms Again" (June 12, 1965)	"Nothing but Heartaches" (Number 11 – September 4, 1965)
5	Michael Jackson	"I Just Can't Stop Loving You" (with Siedah Garrett) (September 19, 1987)	"Dirty Diana" (July 2, 1988)	"Another Part of Me" (Number 11 – September 10, 1988)
5	Mariah Carey	"Vision of Love" (August 4, 1990)	"Emotions" (October 12, 1991)	"Can't Let Go" (Number 2 – January 25, 1992)
5	Mariah Carey	"Fantasy" (September 30, 1995)	"My All" (May 23, 1998)	"When You Believe" (with Whitney Houston) (Number 15 – January 30, 1999)
5	Katy Perry	"California Gurls" (featuring Snoop Dogg) (June 19, 2010)	"Last Friday Night (T.G.I.F.)" (August 27, 2011)	"The One That Got Away" (Number 3 – January 7, 2012)

- Houston's "Thinking About You" is not counted as interrupting the streak, as it never appeared on the Hot 100, due to not being released to Pop radio. Likewise, Perry's "Not Like the Movies" and "Circle the Drain" were only promotional singles, not radio singles.
- With the streak spanning from her debut single "Vision of Love" until "Emotions," Mariah Carey became the first artist in Hot 100 history to have her first five solo singles reach number one on the chart.

=== Most consecutive weeks simultaneously topping the Hot 100 and Billboard 200 ===
Number of weeks	Artist	Year(s) charted	Singles	Albums
12	The Beatles	1964	"I Want to Hold Your Hand", "She Loves You", "Can't Buy Me Love"	Meet the Beatles!, The Beatles' Second Album
12	Whitney Houston	1992–93	"I Will Always Love You"	The Bodyguard: Original Soundtrack Album
8	Bee Gees	1978	"Night Fever"	Saturday Night Fever
7	The Monkees	1966–67	"I'm a Believer"	The Monkees, More of the Monkees
7	Michael Jackson	1983	"Billie Jean"	Thriller
7	Drake	2016	"One Dance" (featuring Wizkid and Kyla)	Views
7	Taylor Swift	2025	"The Fate of Ophelia"	The Life of a Showgirl
6	The Police	1983	"Every Breath You Take"	Synchronicity
6	50 Cent	2005	"Candy Shop"	The Massacre
6	Adele	2015–16	"Hello"	25

=== Most years charting a number-one song ===
Number of years	Artist	First number-one hit and week	Final number-one hit and final week	Calendar years
22	Mariah Carey	"Vision of Love" (August 4, 1990)	"All I Want for Christmas Is You" (January 3, 2026)	1990–2000, 2005–2006, 2008, 2019–2026
11	Taylor Swift	"We Are Never Ever Getting Back Together" (August 25, 2012)	"Patient Zero" (October 24, 2026)	2012, 2014–2015, 2017, 2020–2026
10	Paul McCartney	"Uncle Albert/Admiral Halsey" (September 4, 1971)	"Say Say Say" (January 14, 1984)	1971, 1973–1976, 1978, 1980, 1982–1984
10	Michael Jackson	"Ben" (October 14, 1972)	"You Are Not Alone" (September 2, 1995)	1972, 1979–1980, 1983–1984, 1987–1988, 1991–1992, 1995
10	Madonna	"Like a Virgin" (December 22, 1984)	"Music" (October 7, 2000)	1984–1987, 1989–1992, 1995, 2000
10	Beyoncé	"Crazy in Love" (July 12, 2003)	"Texas Hold 'Em" (March 9, 2024)	2003, 2006–2009, 2017–2018, 2020, 2022, 2024

=== Most consecutive years charting a number-one song ===
Number of years	Artist	First number-one hit and week	Final number-one hit and final week	Highest-peaking song during streak-breaking year
11	Mariah Carey	"Vision of Love" (August 4, 1990)	"Thank God I Found You" (February 19, 2000)	"Loverboy" (Number 2 – August 4, 2001)
8	Mariah Carey	"All I Want for Christmas Is You" (December 21, 2019 - January 3, 2026)		Active streak
7	Elvis Presley^{†}	"Heartbreak Hotel" (March 17, 1956)	"Good Luck Charm" (April 28, 1962)	"(You're The) Devil In Disguise" (Number 3 – August 10, 1963)
7	The Beatles	"I Want to Hold Your Hand" (February 1, 1964)	"The Long and Winding Road" (June 20, 1970)	N/A (did not chart in 1971)
7	Taylor Swift	"Cardigan" (August 8, 2020)	"Patient Zero" (October 24, 2026)	Active streak
6	The Supremes	"Where Did Our Love Go" (August 22, 1964)	"Someday We'll Be Together" (December 27, 1969)	"Stoned Love" (Number 7 – December 19, 1970)
6	Lionel Richie	"Endless Love" (August 15, 1981)	"Say You, Say Me" (January 11, 1986)	"Ballerina Girl" (Number 7 – February 21, 1987)

† – Pre-Hot 100 charts and Hot 100.

=== Most consecutive decades charting a number-one song ===
Number of decades	Artist	Decades
4	Mariah Carey	1990s, 2000s, 2010s, 2020s
3	Stevie Wonder	1960s, 1970s, 1980s
3	Michael Jackson	1970s, 1980s, 1990s
3	Elton John	1970s, 1980s, 1990s
3	Janet Jackson	1980s, 1990s, 2000s
3	Madonna	1980s, 1990s, 2000s
3	Usher	1990s, 2000s, 2010s
3	Britney Spears	1990s, 2000s, 2010s
3	Christina Aguilera	1990s, 2000s, 2010s
3	Beyoncé	2000s, 2010s, 2020s
3	Lady Gaga	2000s, 2010s, 2020s
3	Kanye West	2000s, 2010s, 2020s

- Michael Jackson, Janet Jackson and Lady Gaga are the only artists to score at least two number-one songs in three consecutive decades.
- If Michael Jackson's time with The Jackson 5 is counted, his time atop the chart would extend to four decades (1960s as a member of the Jackson 5, in addition to three decades of solo number-ones); however, their first single, "I Want You Back", did not reach number one on the Hot 100 until the chart of January 31, 1970.
- If Beyoncé's time with Destiny's Child is counted, her time atop the chart would extend to four decades (1990s as a member of Destiny's Child, in addition to three decades of solo number-ones).
- If Diana Ross' time with The Supremes is counted, she would appear on the list with three decades (1960s as a member of the Supremes, 1970s, 1980s).
- If Paul McCartney's time with The Beatles is counted, he would appear on the list with three decades (1960s as a member of the Beatles, 1970s, 1980s).
- If John Lennon's time with The Beatles is counted, he would appear on this list with three decades (1960s as a member of the Beatles, 1970s, 1980s).
- If George Harrison's time with The Beatles is counted, he would appear on this list with three decades (1960s as a member of the Beatles, 1970s, 1980s).

=== Most consecutive years charting on the Hot 100 ===
Active streak

Number of years	Artist	First song of streak and first week	Final song of streak and final week
31	Elton John	"Border Song" (August 15, 1970)	"Someday Out of the Blue" (July 29, 2000)
28	Rod Stewart	"Maggie May" / "Reason To Believe" (July 17, 1971)	"Ooh La La" (November 14, 1998)
26	Stevie Wonder	"Fingertips - Pt. 2" (June 22, 1963)	"My Love" (with Julio Iglesias) (June 18, 1988)
25	Kenny Chesney	"That's Why I'm Here" (May 9, 1998)	"Half of My Hometown" (Kelsea Ballerini featuring Kenny Chesney) (April 9, 2022)
24	Madonna	"Holiday" (October 29, 1983)	"Sorry" (April 15, 2006)
24	Tim McGraw	"Indian Outlaw" (March 5, 1994)	"The Rest of Our Life" (with Faith Hill) (December 9, 2017)
23	Elvis Presley	"Heartbreak Hotel" (February 22, 1956)	"My Way" (January 28, 1978)
23	Keith Urban	"Your Everything" (July 15, 2000)	"Wild Hearts" (June 11, 2022)
22	Lil Wayne	"Go D.J." (October 2, 2004)	"Sticky" (Tyler, the Creator featuring Glorilla, Sexyy Red and Lil Wayne) (January 4, 2025)
22	Jason Aldean	"Hicktown" (August 13, 2005)	"Anytime Soon" (November 14, 2026)
22	Chris Brown	"Run It!" (August 27, 2005)	"For the Moment" (May 23, 2026)
21	Taylor Swift	"Tim McGraw" (September 23, 2006)	"Patient Zero" (October 24, 2026)

† – Pre-Hot 100 charts and Hot 100. If counting from the August 1958 Hot 100 inception, Presley totaled 21 consecutive years charting, starting with "Hard Headed Woman" / "Don't Ask Me Why" on August 4, 1958.

- Note - Mariah Carey has charted at least one song every year on the Hot 100 since her debut with "Vision of Love" (June 2, 1990), except for 2007. If she had charted in 2007, she would have held the record for most consecutive years, with an active streak of 37 years. Her second streak spans 19 years from "Touch My Body" (March 8, 2008) to "All I Want for Christmas Is You" (January 3, 2026).

=== Most number-one songs in a calendar year ===
Number of songs	Artist	Year charted	Singles
6	The Beatles	1964	"I Want to Hold Your Hand"
6	The Beatles	1964	"She Loves You"
6	The Beatles	1964	"Can't Buy Me Love"
6	The Beatles	1964	"Love Me Do"
6	The Beatles	1964	"A Hard Day's Night"
6	The Beatles	1964	"I Feel Fine"
5	The Beatles	1965	"I Feel Fine"
5	The Beatles	1965	"Eight Days a Week"
5	The Beatles	1965	"Ticket to Ride"
5	The Beatles	1965	"Help!"
5	The Beatles	1965	"Yesterday"
4	Elvis Presley^{†}	1956	"Heartbreak Hotel"
4	Elvis Presley^{†}	1956	"I Want You, I Need You, I Love You"
4	Elvis Presley^{†}	1956	"Hound Dog" / "Don't Be Cruel"
4	Elvis Presley^{†}	1956	"Love Me Tender"
4	Elvis Presley^{†}	1957	"Too Much"
4	Elvis Presley^{†}	1957	"All Shook Up"
4	Elvis Presley^{†}	1957	"(Let Me Be Your) Teddy Bear"
4	Elvis Presley^{†}	1957	"Jailhouse Rock"
4	The Supremes	1965	"Come See About Me"
4	The Supremes	1965	"Stop! In the Name of Love"
4	The Supremes	1965	"Back in My Arms Again"
4	The Supremes	1965	"I Hear a Symphony"
4	Jackson 5	1970	"I Want You Back"
4	Jackson 5	1970	"ABC"
4	Jackson 5	1970	"The Love You Save"
4	Jackson 5	1970	"I'll Be There"
4	George Michael	1988	"Faith"
4	George Michael	1988	"Father Figure"
4	George Michael	1988	"One More Try"
4	George Michael	1988	"Monkey"
4	Usher	2004	"Yeah!" (featuring Lil Jon and Ludacris)
4	Usher	2004	"Burn"
4	Usher	2004	"Confessions Part II"
4	Usher	2004	"My Boo" (Duet with Alicia Keys)
4	Rihanna	2010	"Rude Boy"
4	Rihanna	2010	"Love the Way You Lie" (Eminem featuring Rihanna)
4	Rihanna	2010	"What's My Name?" (featuring Drake)
4	Rihanna	2010	"Only Girl (In the World)"
4	Taylor Swift	2026	"The Fate of Ophelia"
4	Taylor Swift	2026	"Opalite"
4	Taylor Swift	2026	"I Knew It, I Knew You"
4	Taylor Swift	2026	"Patient Zero"

† – Pre-Hot 100 charts.
Chart notes: If counting Presley's dual hit song "Don't Be Cruel/Hound Dog" separately, then Presley would have five for 1956. Some Presley songs included here charted number one on Cashbox, but not on the Billboard Top 100, the precursor to the Billboard Hot 100.

If counting Drake's feature on Travis Scott's "Sicko Mode", he would be included on the list with four for 2018 ("God's Plan", "Nice for What", and "In My Feelings")

=== Most weeks at number one in a calendar year ===
Number of weeks	Artist	Year charted	Songs
29	Drake	2018	"God's Plan"
29	Drake	2018	"Nice for What"
29	Drake	2018	"In My Feelings"
28	Usher	2004	"Yeah!" (featuring Lil Jon and Ludacris)
28	Usher	2004	"Burn"
28	Usher	2004	"Confessions Part II"
28	Usher	2004	"My Boo" (with Alicia Keys)
28	Ella Langley	2026	"Choosin' Texas"
26	The Black Eyed Peas	2009	"Boom Boom Pow"
26	The Black Eyed Peas	2009	"I Gotta Feeling"
19	Puff Daddy	1997	"Can't Nobody Hold Me Down" (featuring Mase)
19	Puff Daddy	1997	"I'll Be Missing You" (with Faith Evans featuring 112)
19	Drake	2016	"Work" (Rihanna featuring Drake)
19	Drake	2016	"One Dance" (featuring Wizkid and Kyla)
19	Lil Nas X	2019	"Old Town Road" (featuring Billy Ray Cyrus)
19	Shaboozey	2024	"A Bar Song (Tipsy)"
18	The Beatles	1964	"I Want to Hold Your Hand"
18	The Beatles	1964	"She Loves You"
18	The Beatles	1964	"Can't Buy Me Love"
18	The Beatles	1964	"Love Me Do"
18	The Beatles	1964	"A Hard Day's Night"
18	The Beatles	1964	"I Feel Fine"
18	Monica	1998	"The Boy Is Mine" (Brandy and Monica)
18	Monica	1998	"The First Night"
18	Billy Ray Cyrus	2019	"Old Town Road" (Lil Nas X featuring Billy Ray Cyrus)
18	Roddy Ricch	2020	"The Box"
18	Roddy Ricch	2020	"Rockstar" (DaBaby featuring Roddy Ricch)

- The Black Eyed Peas hold the record for the longest uninterrupted time at number one on the Hot 100, a total of 26 consecutive weeks from April to October 2009. "Boom Boom Pow" spent the first 12 weeks on top, with "I Gotta Feeling" spending the remaining 14 weeks.

=== Most number-two songs ===
Number	Artist
13	Drake
10	Taylor Swift
6	Madonna
5	Creedence Clearwater Revival
5	Elvis Presley
5	The Carpenters
5	Justin Bieber

- If Drake's appearance on "BedRock" as a member of Young Money is counted, he would be listed with a total of 14 songs.
- If Michael Jackson's time with The Jackson 5 and his uncredited appearance on "Somebody's Watching Me" are counted, he would appear on the list with six songs.
- If Paul McCartney's time with The Beatles is counted, he would appear on the list with five songs.
- Creedence Clearwater Revival is the artist with the most songs to peak at number two without topping the chart.

=== Most top five songs ===
Number of songs	Artist	Ref.
48	Drake	
46	Taylor Swift	
29	The Beatles	
28	Madonna	
27	Mariah Carey	
24	Janet Jackson	
24	Rihanna	
21	Elvis Presley	
21	Justin Bieber	
20	Michael Jackson	
20	Stevie Wonder	

- Note - Prior to December 5, 1998, songs were not eligible to enter the Billboard Hot 100 unless they were commercially released as a single. Since then, the Hot 100 changed from being a "singles" chart to a "songs" chart. In the digital era, many album tracks entered the chart without having to be promoted as official singles.

=== Most top ten songs ===
Number of songs	Artist	Ref.
91	Drake	
74	Taylor Swift	
38	Madonna	
36	Elvis Presley^{‡}	
35	The Beatles	
32	Rihanna	
30	Michael Jackson	
29	Elton John	
28	Stevie Wonder	
28	Mariah Carey	

‡ – Pre-Hot 100 charts and Hot 100 included. Elvis Presley has 25 top 10 singles after the inception of the Hot 100.

Notes:

- Prior to December 5, 1998, songs were not eligible to enter the Billboard Hot 100 unless they were commercially released as a single. Since then, the Hot 100 changed from being a "singles" chart to a "songs" chart. In the digital era, many album tracks entered the chart without having to be promoted as official singles.
- All but one of Mariah Carey's top 10 singles also reached the top 5, the exception being "Obsessed", which peaked at number 7.

=== Most cumulative weeks in the top 10 ===
Number of weeks	Artist	Ref.
424	Drake	
371	Taylor Swift	
362	Rihanna^{†}	
355	Bruno Mars	
342	Justin Bieber^{†}	
316	Mariah Carey	
273	Usher	
236	The Weeknd	
230	Post Malone	
225	Madonna	

† – Rihanna is the youngest (23) soloist to receive at least 200 weeks in the top 10. Justin Bieber is the youngest male (25) soloist to do so.

=== Most consecutive weeks in the top 10 ===
Number of weeks	Artist	Years charted	Songs
69	Katy Perry	2010–2011	"California Gurls" (featuring Snoop Dogg)
69	Katy Perry	2010–2011	"Teenage Dream"
69	Katy Perry	2010–2011	"Firework"
69	Katy Perry	2010–2011	"E.T." (featuring Kanye West)
69	Katy Perry	2010–2011	"Last Friday Night (T.G.I.F.)"
61	The Chainsmokers	2016–2017	"Don't Let Me Down" (featuring Daya)
61	The Chainsmokers	2016–2017	"Closer" (featuring Halsey)
61	The Chainsmokers	2016–2017	"Paris"
61	The Chainsmokers	2016–2017	"Something Just Like This" (with Coldplay)
59	Justin Bieber	2021–2022	"Peaches" (featuring Daniel Caesar and Giveon)
59	Justin Bieber	2021–2022	"Stay" (with The Kid Laroi)
59	Justin Bieber	2021–2022	"Essence" (Wizkid featuring Tems and Justin Bieber)
59	Justin Bieber	2021–2022	"Ghost"
51	Drake	2015–2016	"Hotline Bling"
51	Drake	2015–2016	"Work" (Rihanna featuring Drake)
51	Drake	2015–2016	"Summer Sixteen"
51	Drake	2015–2016	"One Dance" (featuring Wizkid and Kyla)
48	Ace of Base	1993–1994	"All That She Wants"
48	Ace of Base	1993–1994	"The Sign"
48	Ace of Base	1993–1994	"Don't Turn Around"

=== Most number-one debuts ===
Number	Artist	Ref.
10	Drake	
10	Taylor Swift	
8	Ariana Grande	
6	BTS	
4	Justin Bieber	
4	Travis Scott	
4	Olivia Rodrigo	
3	Mariah Carey	
3	Future	
3	Kendrick Lamar	
3	Morgan Wallen	

Notes:

- If Young Thug's uncredited appearance on the track "This Is America" is included, he would be listed with three debuts at number one.
- On September 2, 1995, "You Are Not Alone" by Michael Jackson became the first song to debut at number one. Mariah Carey was the first female artist to debut at number one, with "Fantasy", and the first artist to score multiple number-one debuts, with three in total.
- In 2020, Ariana Grande became the first artist in history to debut three and four songs at number one on the Hot 100 and the first to debut three songs at number one in a calendar year. Grande also became the fastest artist to accumulate two number-one debut songs; "Stuck With U", on May 23, 2020, and "Rain on Me", two weeks later, on June 6, 2020.
- Since 2009, at least one song has debuted at number one per year. 2020 holds the record for most debuts at number one in a calendar year, with twelve.
- A total of 94 number-one debuts have occurred through the chart dated October 24, 2026. The most recent is "Patient Zero" by Taylor Swift.

=== Most top 10 debuts ===
Number	Artist	Ref.
75	Drake	
63	Taylor Swift	
18	Travis Scott	
18	Justin Bieber	
18	Ariana Grande	
17	21 Savage	
17	Kendrick Lamar	
16	Morgan Wallen	
14	Eminem	
14	Future	

=== Most top 40 entries ===
Number	Artist	Ref.
245	Drake	
182	Taylor Swift	
91	Lil Wayne	
85	Future	
81	Elvis Presley^{†}	
81	Kanye West	
75	Nicki Minaj	
64	Ariana Grande	
63	Eminem	
62	Beyoncé	
62	Kendrick Lamar	
61	Travis Scott	
60	Elton John	

Notes - Prior to December 5, 1998, songs were not eligible to enter the Billboard Hot 100 unless they were commercially released as a single. Since then, the Hot 100 changed from being a "singles" chart to a "songs" chart. In the digital era, many album tracks entered the chart without having to be promoted as official singles.

=== Most Hot 100 entries ===
Entries (total)	Top 40 entries	Top 10 entries	Number 1s	Artist	Ref.
408	245	91	14	Drake	
281	182	74	16	Taylor Swift	
248	85	16	3	Future	
207	51	3	0	Glee Cast	
195	91	26	3	Lil Wayne	
177	81	21	5	Kanye West	
168	50	13	0	Lil Baby	
149	75	23	3	Nicki Minaj	
135	61	18	5	Travis Scott	
125	54	17	2	Chris Brown	

Notes:

- Prior to December 5, 1998, songs were not eligible to enter the Billboard Hot 100 unless they were commercially released as a single. Since then, the Hot 100 changed from being a "singles" chart to a "songs" chart. In the digital era, many album tracks entered the chart without having to be promoted as official singles.
- Other artists with at least 100 entries are Justin Bieber (123 entries), The Weeknd (117), Lil Uzi Vert (115), 21 Savage (114), Bad Bunny (113), Eminem (112), J. Cole (111), Ariana Grande, YoungBoy Never Broke Again, and Morgan Wallen (110 each), Elvis Presley (109), Beyoncé and Rod Wave (107 each), Jay-Z (105), and Gunna (100).
- Elvis Presley's career predated the inception of the Hot 100 by two years. He has charted 150 singles on Billboard if tracking his entire career.
- YoungBoy Never Broke Again (age 23 years, 198 days) is the youngest soloist to accumulate at least 100 entries on the Hot 100.

=== Most consecutive weeks on Hot 100 ===
Number of weeks	Artist	First song of streak and first week	Final song of streak and final week
431	Drake	"Best I Ever Had" (May 23, 2009)	"Passionfruit" (August 19, 2017)
326	Lil Wayne	"Sweetest Girl" (September 29, 2007)	"Beware" (December 21, 2013)
266	Morgan Wallen	"Sand in My Boots" (October 16, 2021)	currently ongoing
216	Rihanna	"Run This Town" (August 15, 2009)	"Stay" (September 28, 2013)
207	Nicki Minaj	"Knockout" (February 20, 2010)	"Love More" (February 1, 2014)
200	Post Malone	"Congratulations" (January 21, 2017)	"Circles" (November 7, 2020)
188	Drake	"God's Plan" (February 3, 2018)	"Betrayal" (September 4, 2021)
177	Lil Baby	"Baby" (August 3, 2019)	"Heyy" (December 17, 2022)
166	Future	"Fuck Up Some Commas" (April 18, 2015)	"King's Dead" (June 9, 2018)
161	Chris Brown	"Fine China" (April 20, 2013)	"Back to Sleep" (May 14, 2016)

- After his 188-week streak spanning from February 3, 2018–September 4, 2021, Drake was only off the Hot 100 for a single week before beginning a new streak of 32 weeks, stretching between the debut of 21 songs from Certified Lover Boy on September 18, 2021 up until April 30, 2022, when "P Power" spent its final week on the chart. Had he remained on the Hot 100 for that single week, he would have logged 221 consecutive weeks on the chart, making it the forth longest streak of all time.
- After his 142-week streak spanning from July 17, 2010–March 30, 2013, Chris Brown was only off the Hot 100 for two weeks before beginning a new streak of 161 weeks spanning from April 20, 2013–May 14, 2016. Had he remained on the Hot 100 for those two weeks, he would have logged 305 consecutive weeks on the chart, making it the third longest streak of all time.

=== Artists to peak across the entire top ten ===
Artists who have peaked at every position in the Top 10 (Note: Joel Whitburn's methodology for creating pre-1940s chart placings has been criticised, therefore, chart placements in that time frame are excluded.)
Artist	1	2	3	4	5	6	7	8	9	10
21 Savage	"Rockstar"	"My Life"	"Major Distribution"	"Knife Talk"	"Spin Bout U"	"Pussy & Millions"	"Privileged Rappers"	"Circo Loco"	"Runnin"	"Mr. Right Now"
Perry Como	"Till the End of Time"†	"When You Were Sweet Sixteen"†	"If I Loved You"†	"I'm Gonna Love That Gal"†	"I'm Always Chasing Rainbows"†	"Wild Horses"†	"Patricia"†	"Long Ago (and Far Away)"†	"(Did You Ever Get) That Feeling in the Moonlight"†	"I Dream of You"†
Bing Crosby	"Only Forever"†	"Sierra Sue"†	"I'm Too Romantic"†	"Along the Santa Fe Trail"†	"You and I"†	"Til Reveille"†	"New San Antonio Rose"†	"Can't Get Indiana Off My Mind"†	"That's for Me"†	"April Played the Fiddle"†
Drake	"What's My Name?"	"Best I Ever Had"	"She Will"	"Hold On, We're Going Home"	"Find Your Love"	"Right Above It"	"Take Care"	"Forever"	"Make Me Proud"	"I'm on One"
Aretha Franklin	"Respect"	"Chain of Fools"	"Until You Come Back to Me (That's What I'm Gonna Do)"	"Baby I Love You"	"(Sweet Sweet Baby) Since You've Been Gone"	"The House That Jack Built"	"Think"	"(You Make Me Feel Like) A Natural Woman"	"I Never Loved a Man (The Way I Love You)"	"I Say a Little Prayer"
Marvin Gaye	"I Heard It Through the Grapevine"	"What's Going On"	"Sexual Healing"	"Too Busy Thinking About My Baby"	"Your Precious Love"	"How Sweet It Is (To Be Loved by You)"	"You're All I Need to Get By"	"I'll Be Doggone"	"Inner City Blues (Make Me Wanna Holler)"	"Pride and Joy"
Kendrick Lamar	"Bad Blood"	"Mona Lisa"	"N95"	"DNA"	"Die Hard"	"Don't Wanna Know"	"All the Stars"	"Fuckin' Problems"	"Man at the Garden"	"30 for 30"
Ludacris	"Stand Up"	"Oh"	"Holidae In"	"Tonight (I'm Lovin' You)"	"Baby"	"Splash Waterfalls"	"Dirt Road Anthem"	"Gossip Folks"	"Pimpin' All Over the World"	"Move Bitch"
Madonna	"Like a Virgin"	"Material Girl"	"True Blue"	"Lucky Star"	"Angel"	"You'll See"	"Deeper and Deeper"	"Keep It Together"	"Rescue Me"	"Borderline"
Glenn Miller	"Tuxedo Junction†	"Careless"†	"Fools Rush In (Where Angels Fear to Tread)"†	"You and I"†	"Faithful Forever"†	"Five O'Clock Whistle"†	"The Gaucho Serenade"†	"This Changing World"†	"Slow Freight"†	"Starlit Hour"†
Nicki Minaj	"Say So"	"Anaconda"	"Till the World Ends"	"Turn Me On"	"Starships"	"Bottoms Up"	"Barbie World"	"Hey Mama"	"Make Me Proud"	"Dance (Ass)"
Frank Sinatra	"I'll Never Smile Again"†	"All or Nothing at All"†	"We Three (My Echo, My Shadow and Me)"†	"Do I Worry?"†	"Our Love Affair"†	"Just As Though You Were"†	"Stardust"†	"Imagination"†	"You're Lonely and I'm Lonely"†	"Trade Winds"†
Taylor Swift	"We Are Never Ever Getting Back Together"	"You Belong with Me"	"Mine"	"Love Story"	"Wildest Dreams"	"Back to December"	"Begin Again"	"Speak Now"	"Fearless"	"Change"
Kanye West	"Slow Jamz"	"Heartless"	"Love Lockdown"	"FourFiveSeconds"	"Swagga Like Us"	"I Love It"	"All Falls Down"	"Forever"	"American Boy"	"Jail"

Nine out of ten (showing their one missing achievement)
1	2	3	4	5	6	7	8	9	10
N/A	N/A	Connie Francis; Future; Morgan Wallen	Chris Brown; Lil Wayne; The Rolling Stones; Travis Scott	N/A	Stevie Wonder	Justin Timberlake	Michael Jackson	The Beatles; Jay-Z	Eminem; Daryl Hall & John Oates; Elton John; Rihanna

- If John Lennon's and Ringo Starr's times with The Beatles are counted, they would each appear on the list, as their respective solo hits "Number 9 Dream" and "Back Off Boogaloo" both peaked at number 9.

† – Pre-Hot 100

=== Self-replacement at number one ===
- The Beatles^{†} – "I Want to Hold Your Hand" → "She Loves You" (March 21, 1964); "She Loves You" → "Can't Buy Me Love" (April 4, 1964)
- Boyz II Men – "I'll Make Love to You" → "On Bended Knee" (December 3, 1994)
- Puff Daddy – "I'll Be Missing You" (Puff Daddy and Faith Evans featuring 112) → "Mo Money Mo Problems" (The Notorious B.I.G. featuring Puff Daddy and Mase) (August 30, 1997)
- Ja Rule – "Always on Time" (Ja Rule featuring Ashanti) → "Ain't It Funny" (Jennifer Lopez featuring Ja Rule) (March 9, 2002)
- Nelly – "Hot in Herre" → "Dilemma" (Nelly featuring Kelly Rowland) (August 17, 2002)
- OutKast – "Hey Ya!" → "The Way You Move" (OutKast featuring Sleepy Brown) (February 14, 2004)
- Usher – "Yeah!" (Usher featuring Lil Jon and Ludacris) → "Burn" (May 22, 2004); "Burn" → "Confessions Part II" (July 24, 2004)
- T.I. – "Whatever You Like" → "Live Your Life" (T.I. featuring Rihanna) (October 18, 2008); "Whatever You Like" → "Live Your Life" (November 15, 2008)
- The Black Eyed Peas – "Boom Boom Pow" → "I Gotta Feeling" (July 11, 2009)
- Taylor Swift^{‡} – "Shake It Off" → "Blank Space" (November 29, 2014); "Cruel Summer" → "Is It Over Now?" (November 11, 2023); "Is It Over Now?" → "Cruel Summer" (November 18, 2023)
- The Weeknd – "Can't Feel My Face" → "The Hills" (October 3, 2015)
- Justin Bieber – "Sorry" → "Love Yourself" (February 13, 2016); "I'm the One" (DJ Khaled featuring Justin Bieber, Quavo, Chance the Rapper and Lil Wayne) → "Despacito" (Luis Fonsi and Daddy Yankee featuring Justin Bieber) (May 27, 2017)
- Drake – "God's Plan" → "Nice for What" (April 21, 2018); "Nice for What" → "In My Feelings" (July 21, 2018)
- BTS^{‡} – "Butter" → "Permission to Dance" (July 24, 2021); "Permission to Dance" → "Butter" (July 31, 2021)
- Kendrick Lamar – "Not Like Us" → "Luther" (Kendrick Lamar and SZA) (March 1, 2025)

† – The Beatles are the only act in history to have three consecutive, self-replacing number ones.

‡ – BTS and Taylor Swift are the only acts in history to replace themselves at number one in two consecutive weeks.

=== Most consecutive top positions simultaneously occupied ===
Number	Artist	Date	Ref.
14	Taylor Swift	May 4, 2024	
12	Taylor Swift	October 18, 2025	
10	Taylor Swift	November 5, 2022	
5	The Beatles	April 4, 1964	
5	Drake	September 18, 2021	
5	Kendrick Lamar	December 7, 2024	
4	The Beatles	March 28, 1964	
4	Drake	May 30, 2026	
3	The Beatles	March 14, 1964	
3	The Beatles	March 21, 1964	
3	The Beatles	April 25, 1964	
3	Ariana Grande	February 23, 2019	
3	Drake	March 20, 2021	
3	Drake	October 21, 2023	
3	Taylor Swift	November 11, 2023	
3	Kendrick Lamar	February 22, 2025	
3	Morgan Wallen	May 31, 2025	

- Prior to 2000, only the Beatles, the Bee Gees and Puff Daddy had weeks where they simultaneously occupied the top two positions. The Beatles had also simultaneously occupied the top three, four and five positions during various weeks in early 1964. Since 2000, numerous recording acts have simultaneously occupied the top two, including Usher, Mariah Carey, the Black Eyed Peas, the Weeknd, Justin Bieber, Drake, and Bad Bunny. On February 23, 2019, Ariana Grande became the first act since the Beatles and first solo artist to simultaneously occupy the top three.
- On November 5, 2022, Taylor Swift became the first act to simultaneously occupy more than 5 consecutive top positions, having held 10 consecutive top spots. She also became the first artist to simultaneously occupy more than 10 consecutive top positions, having held the top 14 on May 4, 2024, and the top 12 on October 18, 2025.

=== Most simultaneous entries in the top 5 ===
Number	Artist	Date	Ref.
5	The Beatles	April 4, 1964	
5	Drake	September 18, 2021	
5	Taylor Swift	November 5, 2022	
5	Taylor Swift	May 4, 2024	
5	Kendrick Lamar	December 7, 2024	
5	Taylor Swift	October 18, 2025	
4	The Beatles	March 28, 1964	
4	Drake	October 21, 2023	
4	Taylor Swift	November 11, 2023	
4	Drake	May 30, 2026	
4	Taylor Swift	October 10, 2026	

- On February 21, 2026, Bad Bunny became the first Latino, Hispanic, and Spanish-language act to simultaneously occupy more than one position within the top 5.

=== Most simultaneous entries in the top 10 ===
Number	Artist	Date	Ref.
10	Taylor Swift	November 5, 2022	
10	Taylor Swift	May 4, 2024	
10	Taylor Swift	October 18, 2025	
9	Drake	September 18, 2021	
9	Drake	May 30, 2026	
8	Drake	November 19, 2022	
8	Taylor Swift	November 11, 2023	
8	Taylor Swift	October 25, 2025	
7	Drake	July 14, 2018	
7	21 Savage	November 19, 2022	
7	Drake	October 21, 2023	
7	Kendrick Lamar	December 7, 2024	

- Only the Beatles and the Bee Gees managed at least three simultaneous top ten singles before the use of Nielsen SoundScan and Nielsen Broadcast Data Systems to compile the Hot 100 on November 30, 1991. The first to achieve three since then was Ashanti in March 2002.
- The Beatles were the only recording act to have five simultaneous top ten singles prior to November 30, 1991. They did it in consecuitve weeks on April 4 and 11, 1964. The next to match that achievement was Drake, who placed seven in the top ten on July 14, 2018.
- Taylor Swift, Max Martin, and Shellback are the only songwriters to occupy the entire top 10 songs of the chart, Swift having done so on three occasions.

=== Most simultaneous entries in a single week ===
Number	Artists	Date	Ref.
42	Drake	May 30, 2026	
37	Morgan Wallen	May 31, 2025	
36	Morgan Wallen	March 18, 2023	
32	Morgan Wallen	June 7, 2025	
32	Taylor Swift	May 4, 2024	
31	Taylor Swift	May 11, 2024	
31	Playboi Carti	March 29, 2025	
28	Morgan Wallen	March 25, 2023	
27	Drake	July 14, 2018	
27	Morgan Wallen	June 14, 2025	

=== Most decades charting a top-ten song ===
Most decades
Artist	Decades									Top-tens
Michael Jackson	6 / (7)^{†}		('60s)^{†}	'70s	'80s	'90s	'00s	'10s	'20s	33 / (44)^{†}
Andy Williams	5	'50s	'60s	'70s				'10s	'20s	5
Mariah Carey	4					'90s	'00s	'10s	'20s	28
Jay-Z	4					'90s	'00s	'10s	'20s	22
Snoop Dogg	4					'90s	'00s	'10s	'20s	12
Britney Spears	4					'90s	'00s	'10s	'20s	14
Elton John	4			'70s	'80s	'90s			'20s	29
The Beatles	4		'60s	'70s		'90s			'20s	35
Whitney Houston	4				'80s	'90s	'00s	'10s		23
Madonna	4				'80s	'90s	'00s	'10s		38
Aerosmith	4			'70s	'80s	'90s	'00s			8
Cher	4		'60s	'70s	'80s	'90s				12
Barbra Streisand	4		'60s	'70s	'80s	'90s				12

† – If Michael Jackson's time with The Jackson 5 is counted, his time in the Top-10 chart would extend to seven decades and 44 Top-tens (1960s as a member of the Jackson 5, in addition to six decades and 33 solo top-tens); their first single, "I Want You Back", did reach the Hot 100-top 10 on December 27, 1969 at rank 8.

=== Posthumous number-ones ===
- Otis Redding (d. December 10, 1967) – "(Sittin' On) The Dock of the Bay" (March 16, 1968)
- Janis Joplin (d. October 4, 1970) – "Me and Bobby McGee" (March 20, 1971)
- Jim Croce (d. September 20, 1973) – "Time in a Bottle" (December 29, 1973)
- John Lennon (d. December 8, 1980) – "(Just Like) Starting Over" (December 27, 1980)
- The Notorious B.I.G. (d. March 9, 1997) – "Hypnotize" (May 3, 1997) and "Mo Money Mo Problems" (August 30, 1997)
- Soulja Slim (d. November 26, 2003) – "Slow Motion" (Juvenile featuring Soulja Slim) (August 7, 2004)
- Static Major (d. February 25, 2008) – "Lollipop" (Lil Wayne featuring Static Major) (May 3, 2008)
- XXXTentacion (d. June 18, 2018) – "Sad!" (June 30, 2018)

=== Fictional bands to reach number one ===
- The Chipmunks – "The Chipmunk Song (Christmas Don't Be Late)" (The Chipmunks with David Seville) (December 22, 1958)
- The Archies – "Sugar, Sugar" (September 20, 1969)
- The Partridge Family – "I Think I Love You" (November 21, 1970)
- The Heights – "How Do You Talk To An Angel" (November 14, 1992)
- Huntrix – "Golden" (Huntrix: Ejae, Audrey Nuna and Rei Ami) (August 16, 2025)

=== Age records ===
- Brenda Lee (age 79 years, 26 days) is the oldest artist to top the Hot 100. She initially set the record with "Rockin' Around the Christmas Tree" on December 9, 2023, and reset the record with the song's additional weeks at number one, on January 6, 2024. Lee recorded the song in 1958, when she was 13, and would have been the youngest female artist to top the Hot 100 had the song been number one in that year.
- Cher (age 52 years, 297 days) is the oldest female artist to top the Hot 100 with a non-catalog single, setting the record with "Believe" on March 13, 1999.
- Louis Armstrong (age 62 years, 279 days) is the oldest male artist to top the Hot 100. He set that record with "Hello, Dolly!" on May 9, 1964. Armstrong (born 1901) is also the earliest-born artist to top the chart.
- Michael Jackson (age 11 years, 155 days) is the youngest artist to top the Hot 100. He achieved the record, as part of the Jackson 5, with "I Want You Back" on January 31, 1970.
- Stevie Wonder (age 13 years, 89 days) is the youngest solo artist to top the Hot 100. He set the record with "Fingertips Pt. 2" on August 10, 1963.
- Little Peggy March (age 15 years, 50 days) is the youngest female artist to top the Hot 100. The song which established this record for her was "I Will Follow Him", which reached number one on April 27, 1963.
- The Kid Laroi (born 2003) is the most recently born artist to top the Hot 100, which he did with "Stay" on August 14, 2021.
- Olivia Rodrigo (age 17 years, 338 days) is the youngest solo artist to debut at number one on the Hot 100. She set the record with "Drivers License" on January 23, 2021.
- Justin Bieber (age 21 years, 202 days) is the youngest male solo artist to debut atop the Hot 100. He set the record with "What Do You Mean?" on September 19, 2015.
- Rihanna (age 23 years, 69 days) is the youngest artist to collect 10 chart-toppers on the Hot 100. She set the record with "S&M" on April 11, 2011.
- Marjorie Grande (under the name "Nonna") (age 98 years, 163 days) was the oldest living artist to chart on the Hot 100. She was featured on her granddaughter Ariana Grande's song "Ordinary Things", which ranked at No. 55 on March 23, 2024. The previous record was held by Fred Stobaugh who was age 96 years, 23 days when he was featured on the Green Shoe Studio song "Oh Sweet Lorraine", which ranked at number 42 on September 14, 2013.
  - Marjorie Grande, as "Nonna", was also the oldest living artist to make their debut on the Hot 100 with her entry under "Ordinary Things" on the same date.
- French-born Jordy Lemoine (age 5 years, 156 days) is the youngest artist to chart on the Hot 100. He established the record when his song "Dur dur d'être bébé! (It's Tough to Be a Baby)", where he is credited simply as Jordy, entered the chart on June 19, 1993.
- Rumi Carter (age 6 years, 305 days) is the youngest female artist to appear on the chart, featuring on her mother Beyoncé's song "Protector", which debuted at number 42 on the chart dated April 13, 2024. She broke the record previously held by her sister Blue Ivy Carter, who featured on "Brown Skin Girl" with Beyoncé, Saint Jhn, and WizKid. That song peaked at number 76 in 2019, when Blue Ivy was seven. (Notably, Blue Ivy is the youngest person ever to appear on any Billboard chart, featuring on "Glory" by her father Jay-Z, which was recorded and released two days after her birth. While the track debuted at number 74 on the US Hot R&B/Hip-Hop Songs and number 23 on the US Rap Songs, it did not appear on the Hot 100.)

=== Gap and span records ===
- The longest gap between number-one hits on the Hot 100 for an artist is 63 years, 46 days by Brenda Lee. Her single "Rockin' Around the Christmas Tree" hit number one on December 9, 2023, her first time on top since "I Want to Be Wanted" on October 24, 1960.
- Brenda Lee also holds the record span between first and most recent number one on the Hot 100 over the longest period of time: 63 years, five months, two weeks, and five days dating to her first week at number one on the chart dated July 18, 1960, with "I'm Sorry" to her most recent number one, "Rockin' Around the Christmas Tree", which was most recently at number one on the chart dated January 6, 2024.
- Mariah Carey's "All I Want for Christmas Is You" has the longest span from a song's first week at number one on the Hot 100 to its most recent: seven years (December 21, 2019–January 3, 2026).
- The record for the longest wait from an artist's Hot 100 debut entry to its first number one is Santana, with 30 years between the time the band first entered the Hot 100 with "Jingo" (October 25, 1969) and the first of 12 weeks at number one with "Smooth," featuring Rob Thomas (October 23, 1999).
- The record for most Hot 100 entries before a number one is held by Future, whose feature on Drake's "Way 2 Sexy" alongside Young Thug scored him his first number one single on his 126th chart entry.
- When "4th Dimension" by Kids See Ghosts featuring Louis Prima debuted at number 42 for the week of June 23, 2018, Prima became the artist with the longest gap between appearances on the Hot 100, 57 years, 130 days since his last previous charted single, "Wonderland by Night", which last appeared at number 89 on the Hot 100, dated February 13, 1961.
- Bobby Helms holds the longest wait for an artist's first top 10: 60 years, four months and two weeks. His song "Borrowed Dreams" debuted on the third Hot 100 chart (dated August 18, 1958), and "Jingle Bell Rock" reached the top 10 on the chart dated January 5, 2019.
- Nat King Cole's "The Christmas Song" holds the record for the longest trip to the Hot 100's top 10: 62 years and 26 days. It first appeared on the Hot 100 dated December 12, 1960 and reached the top 10 on the chart dated January 7, 2023, peaking at number 7. Cole additionally holds the record for the longest break between Hot 100 top 10s, with a span of 59 years, six months, and one week. His single "Those Lazy-Hazy-Crazy Days of Summer" reached number 6 in June 1963, and his return to the top 10 with "The Christmas Song" reached number 9 on the chart dated January 7, 2023.
- Taylor Swift holds the record for the longest span of number one debuts with twelve years, one month, and 4 days. She surpassed Lady Gaga, who held the record previously with nine years, three months, and one week.
- BTS holds the record for the shortest span to accumulate three number one debuts, with four months and four days.

== Album achievements ==
=== Most number-one songs from one album ===
Number of Singles	Artist	Album	Year
5	Michael Jackson	Bad	1987
5	Katy Perry	Teenage Dream	2010
4	Various artists	Saturday Night Fever	1977
4	Whitney Houston	Whitney	1987
4	George Michael	Faith	1987
4	Paula Abdul	Forever Your Girl	1988
4	Janet Jackson	Janet Jackson's Rhythm Nation 1814	1989
4	Mariah Carey	Mariah Carey	1990
4	Usher	Confessions	2004

- Saturday Night Fever generated number-one singles for two different artists: "How Deep Is Your Love", "Stayin' Alive" and "Night Fever" by the Bee Gees; and "If I Can't Have You" by Yvonne Elliman. "A Fifth Of Beethoven" by Walter Murphy, "You Should Be Dancing" and "Jive Talkin'" by the Bee Gees also appear on the album and had previously reached number one.
- Katy Perry's Teenage Dream: The Complete Confection, a reissue of the Teenage Dream album, featured an additional number-one single, "Part of Me".
- Taylor Swift's 1989 produced three number-one singles ("Shake it Off," "Blank Space," and "Bad Blood" with Kendrick Lamar) while the re-recorded reissue, 1989 (Taylor's Version), produced an additional number-one ("Is It Over Now? (Taylor's Version) (From The Vault)").

=== Most top ten songs from one album ===
Number of songs	Artist	Album	Year
14	Taylor Swift	The Life of a Showgirl (including The Encore)	2025
10	Taylor Swift	Midnights	2022
10	Taylor Swift	The Tortured Poets Department	2024
9	Drake	Iceman	2026
9	Drake	Certified Lover Boy	2021
9	Morgan Wallen	I'm the Problem	2025
8	Drake and 21 Savage	Her Loss (Note: The song BackOutsideBoyz does not feature 21 Savage, meaning the total number of top ten songs he is credited on is 7.)	2022
7	Michael Jackson^{†}	Thriller	1982
7	Bruce Springsteen^{†}	Born in the U.S.A.	1984
7	Janet Jackson^{†}	Janet Jackson's Rhythm Nation 1814	1989
7	Drake	Scorpion	2018
7	Drake	For All the Dogs	2023
7	Taylor Swift	1989 (Taylor's Version)	2023
7	Kendrick Lamar	GNX	2024
6	Michael Jackson	Bad	1987
6	George Michael	Faith	1987
6	Janet Jackson	Janet.	1993
6	Katy Perry	Teenage Dream (Note: Two top-ten singles from the Teenage Dream: The Complete Confection reissue, "Part of Me" and "Wide Awake", additionally bring the album's total count to eight.)	2010
6	Juice Wrld	Legends Never Die	2020
6	Morgan Wallen	One Thing at a Time	2023

† – Michael Jackson, Bruce Springsteen, and Janet Jackson jointly hold the record for most top 10 officially-released singles from one album with seven (from Thriller, Born in the U.S.A., and Janet Jackson's Rhythm Nation 1814, respectively).

=== Other album achievements ===
- Janet Jackson's Janet Jackson's Rhythm Nation 1814 has the most top 5 singles, with 7.
- Taylor Swift and Drake have the most albums with five or more Top 10 hits with five albums. For Swift, those albums are 1989, Midnights, 1989 (Taylor's Version), The Tortured Poets Department, and The Life of a Showgirl. For Drake they are Scorpion, Certified Lover Boy, Her Loss, For All the Dogs, and Iceman. Swift's album Fearless additionally has five top 10 hits if its deluxe reissue is included. Janet Jackson is in third place, with Control, Janet Jackson's Rhythm Nation 1814, and Janet.
- Morgan Wallen's I'm the Problem placed 36 of its 37 songs simultaneously on the Billboard Hot 100 on the week of May 31, 2025, with 29 debuts joining seven previously charting songs alongside one previously charting feature. Taylor Swift's The Tortured Poets Department placed all 31 of its songs simultaneously on the Hot 100 on the week of May 4, 2024 (alongside one previously charting song from Lover), the record among female artists.
- Taylor Swift's Midnights became the first album to have 10 of its tracks occupy the entire top 10, as well as having 10 track debuts in the top 10 on the November 5, 2022 chart, surpassing Drake's Certified Lover Boy, which had nine of its tracks debut in the top 10 and occupy 9 of the top 10 slots on the chart on the September 18, 2021 chart.
- Taylor Swift's The Tortured Poets Department became the first album to have more than 10 consecutive tracks at the top of the Hot 100 when it debuted occupying the top 14 spots on May 4, 2024.
- Beyoncé's Lemonade became the first female album to chart twelve or more songs on the US Billboard Hot 100 at the same time, with every song on the album debuting on the chart.
- Taylor Swift's The Life of a Showgirl became the first album to have all of its tracks debut in the top 12 spots of the US Billboard Hot 100 on October 13, 2025.

Note: Numbers listed here are, per Billboard's rules, over one release.

== Producer achievements ==
=== Producers with the most number-one songs ===
Number of songs	Producer(s)	Best known for producing for	Biggest number-one hit and date
29	Max Martin	Ariana Grande, Katy Perry, Taylor Swift, Britney Spears, The Weeknd	"Blinding Lights" (November 29, 2019)
23	George Martin	The Beatles	"Hey Jude" (September 28, 1968)
18	Dr. Luke	Katy Perry, Kesha	"Tik Tok" (January 2, 2010)
16	Steve Sholes^{†}	Elvis Presley	"Hound Dog/Don't Be Cruel" (August 18, 1956)
16	Jimmy Jam, Terry Lewis	Janet Jackson	"Miss You Much" (October 7, 1989)
15	Mariah Carey	Herself	"All I Want for Christmas Is You" (December 21, 2019)
14	Barry Gibb	Bee Gees, Andy Gibb	"How Deep Is Your Love" (December 24, 1977)

† – Pre-Hot 100 charts and Hot 100

== Songwriter achievements ==
=== Songwriters with the most number-one songs ===
Number of songs	Songwriter	Best known for writing for	Biggest number-one hit and date
32	Paul McCartney	The Beatles	"Hey Jude" (September 28, 1968)
31	Max Martin	Katy Perry, Taylor Swift, Britney Spears, The Weeknd, Ariana Grande	"Blinding Lights" (April 4, 2020)
26	John Lennon	The Beatles	"Hey Jude" (September 28, 1968)
18	Mariah Carey	Herself	"All I Want for Christmas Is You" (December 21, 2019)
18	Dr. Luke	Katy Perry, Kesha	"Tik Tok" (January 2, 2010)
16	Barry Gibb	Bee Gees, Andy Gibb	"How Deep Is Your Love" (December 24, 1977)
16	Taylor Swift	Herself	"Anti-Hero" (November 5, 2022)

=== Most number-one songs in a calendar year ===
Number of songs	Songwriter(s)	Year	Number-one hits (in chronological order)
7	John Lennon; Paul McCartney	1964	The Beatles – "I Want to Hold Your Hand"^{†}, "She Loves You"^{†}, "Can't Buy Me Love"^{†}, "Love Me Do"; Peter and Gordon – "A World Without Love"; The Beatles – "A Hard Day's Night", "I Feel Fine"^{†††}
7	Barry Gibb^{††}	1978	Bee Gees – "How Deep Is Your Love", "Stayin' Alive"^{†} Andy Gibb – "(Love Is) Thicker Than Water"^{†} Bee Gees – "Night Fever"^{†} Yvonne Elliman – "If I Can't Have You"^{†} Andy Gibb – "Shadow Dancing"; Frankie Valli – "Grease"
5	Lamont Dozier; Brian Holland; Eddie Holland	1965	The Supremes – "Come See About Me", "Stop! In the Name of Love", "Back in My Arms Again"^{†} Four Tops – "I Can't Help Myself (Sugar Pie Honey Bunch)"^{†} The Supremes – "I Hear a Symphony"
5	John Lennon^{†††} Paul McCartney^{†††}	1965	The Beatles – "I Feel Fine", "Eight Days a Week", "Ticket to Ride", "Help!", "Yesterday"^{†††}
5	Robin Gibb; Maurice Gibb	1978	Bee Gees – "How Deep Is Your Love", "Stayin' Alive", "Night Fever"^{†} Yvonne Elliman – "If I Can't Have You"^{†} Andy Gibb – "Shadow Dancing"

† – Chronologically sequential, replacing each other at number one.

†† – Holds all-time record of writing the most consecutively charted (self-replacing) number one songs on the Hot 100, with four.

††† – Hold all-time record of writing the most consecutive number one A-side singles, with six. Record includes these five 1965 A-sides and "We Can Work It Out", which hit number one in January 1966.

== Selected additional Hot 100 achievements ==
- The first number-one song on the Hot 100 was "Poor Little Fool" by Ricky Nelson (August 4, 1958).
- On June 17, 1978, Andy Gibb became the first solo artist in the Hot 100 history to have his first three chart singles reach number one. The only acts to surpass this achievement are the Jackson 5, whose first four singles topped the chart in 1970, and Mariah Carey, whose first five singles reached number one between 1990 and 1991.
- The number one song in the first week Billboard incorporated sales and airplay data from Nielsen SoundScan and Nielsen Broadcast Data Systems was "Set Adrift on Memory Bliss" by P.M. Dawn (November 30, 1991).
- The number one song in the first week Billboard allowed songs without a commercial single release to chart on the Hot 100 was "I'm Your Angel" by R. Kelly and Céline Dion (December 5, 1998). Alhough the song was making its first appearance on the Hot 100 that week, Billboard did not consider it a debut at number one, since it appeared on unpublished test charts prior to the allowance of airplay-only songs on the main chart. "I'm Your Angel" also entered the Hot 100 Singles Sales chart that week at number one, so it would have been ineligible to chart on the Hot 100 before then.
- The first "airplay-only" song to reach number one (no points from a commercial single release) was "Try Again" by Aaliyah (June 17, 2000).
- "We Don't Talk About Bruno", by Carolina Gaitán, Mauro Castillo, Adassa, Rhenzy Feliz, Diane Guerrero, Stephanie Beatriz, and the cast of Encanto, set the record for the most credited artists on a number one song (February 5, 2022).
- Drake is the first artist to simultaneously hold the top three spots on the Billboard Hot 100 singles chart and Billboard 200 albums chart. He achieved this feat on May 30, 2026, with "Janice STFU", "Ran to Atlanta", and "Whisper My Name" as the top three singles, while Iceman, Habibti, and Maid of Honour were the top three albums.
- The Beatles are the only other artists to simultaneously hold the top two spots on the Billboard Hot 100 singles chart and Billboard 200 albums chart. They achieved this feat for nine consecutive weeks, from February 29, 1964, to April 25, 1964. For the first five weeks of that run, through March 28, 1964, "I Want to Hold Your Hand" and "She Loves You" were the top two singles (which swapped positions during March 1964), while Meet the Beatles! and Introducing... The Beatles held the top two spots on the albums chart. For the remaining weeks of the run, "Can't Buy Me Love" and their cover of "Twist and Shout" were the top two singles, while Meet the Beatles! and Introducing... The Beatles continued their reign as the top two albums.
- Justin Bieber is the first artist in history to achieve new number one songs in consecutive weeks on the Hot 100. On the chart dated May 27, 2017, Luis Fonsi and Daddy Yankee's "Despacito" replaced DJ Khaled's "I'm the One" which debuted at number one a week prior, both songs on which he is a featured artist.
- On December 4, 2010, Rihanna's "Only Girl (In the World)" reached the top spot two weeks after "What's My Name?", becoming the first time in Hot 100 history that an album's lead single hit number one after the second single did.
- On the chart dated January 28, 2017, Ed Sheeran became the first artist to debut more than one song in the top 10 for the same week: "Shape of You" debuted at number one, while "Castle on the Hill" entered at number six.
- Justin Bieber became the first artist to have seven songs from a debut album chart on the Hot 100, following the release of his debut seven-track EP My World on December 5, 2009.
- Drake is the first artist to have a number-one debut replace another number-one debut. He did this on April 21, 2018, when "Nice For What" replaced "God's Plan" at the summit, after the latter had spent eleven weeks on top.
- Ariana Grande is the only artist to have the lead single from each of her first eight albums debut in the Hot 100's top 10.
- Ariana Grande is the first artist to have each of their ten number-one songs all hit number one in both the song's and her first credited week. She achieved this with "Thank U, Next", "7 Rings", "Stuck With U" (with Justin Bieber), "Rain On Me" (with Lady Gaga), "Positions", "Save Your Tears" (with The Weeknd), "Die For You" (with The Weeknd), "Yes, And?", "We Can't Be Friends (Wait For Your Love)", and "Hate That I Made You Love Me". Grande's first week as a credited artist for "Save Your Tears" and "Die For You" occurred during the first week each song hit number one.
- Blood, Sweat & Tears by Blood, Sweat & Tears is the album with the most songs to peak at number two without topping the chart, with three ("You've Made Me So Very Happy", "Spinning Wheel", "And When I Die").
- Ariana Grande holds the record for the most number one duets in Hot 100 history: "Stuck with U" (with Justin Bieber), "Rain On Me" (with Lady Gaga), "Save Your Tears" (with the Weeknd) and "Die for You" (with the Weeknd).
- Taylor Swift is the first act in history to simultaneously debut at number one on both the Billboard 200 and Billboard Hot 100 charts. She achieved it when her eighth studio album, Folklore, debuted atop the Billboard 200 in the same week as its lead single "Cardigan" debuted atop the Hot 100, on the charts dated August 8, 2020. She is also the first act in history to achieve the said record a total of seven times. Her second time was with her ninth studio album, Evermore, and its lead single "Willow" (December 26, 2020); the third with Red (Taylor's Version) and "All Too Well (Taylor's Version)" (November 27, 2021); the fourth with Midnights and its lead single, "Anti-Hero" (November 5, 2022); the fifth with 1989 (Taylor's Version) and "Is It Over Now?" (November 11, 2023); the sixth with The Tortured Poets Department and "Fortnight"; and the seventh with The Life of a Showgirl and "The Fate of Ophelia".
- The Weeknd's 2019 song "Blinding Lights" holds the record for the highest re-entry in the charts history, after falling off the chart dated January 2, 2021 and re-entering the top ten at number 3 the following week.
- The chart dated March 20, 2021, marked the first time that the top four songs were all simultaneous debuts on the Hot 100. It was also the first time that the top three were all simultaneous debuts, with Drake carrying those three songs ("What's Next", "Wants and Needs" and "Lemon Pepper Freestyle") to become the first artist to debut in positions one, two and three on the same chart. Debuting at number four was "Leave the Door Open" by Silk Sonic.
- Olivia Rodrigo is the first artist in history to debut their first three singles inside the top 10 of the Hot 100. She achieved it with "Drivers License", "Deja Vu", and "Good 4 U".
- Sour (2021) by Olivia Rodrigo is the first debut album in history to score two number-one debuts on the Hot 100, doing so with "Drivers License" and "Good 4 U".
- The chart dated May 29, 2021, marked the first time five songs simultaneously debuted inside the top 10 of the Hot 100. It was achieved by Olivia Rodrigo's "Good 4 U", J. Cole's "My Life", "Amari", "Pride is the Devil" and "95 South", which debuted at numbers 1, 2, 5, 7 and 8, respectively.
- On the chart dated October 29, 2022, Sam Smith and Kim Petras became the first openly non-binary and openly transgender artists, respectively, to reach number one, with their duet "Unholy".
- "All I Want for Christmas Is You" by Mariah Carey became the first song to have eight separate runs at number one on the Hot 100.
- "Last Night" by Morgan Wallen became the first song to have peaked at number one during six consecutive months.
- On the chart dated November 5, 2022, male artists were absent from the top 10 for the first time; Taylor Swift and Lana Del Rey were the only artists present in the region. It also marked the fewest artists present in the top 10 with two. This record was matched on October 18, 2025, when Swift and Sabrina Carpenter were the only artists present in the top 10.
- The Beatles and Taylor Swift are the only two acts to simultaneously chart top tens from three of their own albums. The Beatles achieved this first on the chart dated February 29, 1964, with "I Want to Hold Your Hand" (Meet the Beatles!) at number one, "She Loves You" (The Beatles' Second Album) at number two, and "Please Please Me" (Introducing... The Beatles) at number six. Swift tied the total on the chart dated July 22, 2023, also becoming the first female artist to do so, charting "I Can See You (Taylor's Version)" (Speak Now (Taylor's Version)) at number five, "Cruel Summer" (Lover) at number nine, and "Karma" (featuring Ice Spice) (Midnights) at number ten.
- Taylor Swift has the record for the most songs charting in the top 40, with 26 songs in the region on May 4, 2024, following the release of The Tortured Poets Department.
- Beyoncé is the only artist to have double‑digit weeks atop the Hot 100 both as a soloist and as a member of a group. She spent 10 weeks at number one with "Irreplaceable" and 11 weeks at number one with Destiny's Child's "Independent Women Part I", which also holds the record for the longest‑running number one by an all‑female group on the Hot 100.
- Sleep Token became the first rock band to debut every song from an album into the US Billboard Hot 100. Their 2025 album Even In Arcadia, had every single song debut with "Infinite Baths" just making it in at number 100.
- Drake was the first artist to chart more than 300 songs on the Hot 100, surpassing 300 in 2023, and surpassing 400 in 2026 with his triple-album release of Iceman, Habibti, and Maid of Honour.

== See also ==
- Lists of Billboard number-one singles
- List of artists who reached number one in the United States

== Additional sources ==
- Fred Bronson's Billboard Book of Number 1 Hits, 5th Edition (ISBN 0-8230-7677-6)
- Christopher G. Feldman, The Billboard Book of No. 2 Singles (ISBN 0-8230-7695-4)
- Joel Whitburn's Top Pop Singles 1955–2008 (ISBN 0-89820-180-2)
- Joel Whitburn Presents the Billboard Pop Charts, 1955–1959 (ISBN 0-89820-092-X)
- Joel Whitburn Presents the Billboard Hot 100 Charts: The Sixties (ISBN 0-89820-074-1)
- Joel Whitburn Presents the Billboard Hot 100 Charts: The Seventies (ISBN 0-89820-076-8)
- Joel Whitburn Presents the Billboard Hot 100 Charts: The Eighties (ISBN 0-89820-079-2)
- Joel Whitburn Presents the Billboard Hot 100 Charts: The Nineties (ISBN 0-89820-137-3)
- Joel Whitburn Presents the Billboard Hot 100 Charts: The 2000s (ISBN 0-89820-182-9)
- Additional information obtained can be verified within Billboard's online archive services and print editions of the magazine.
