= Hold On (Jamie Walters song) =

1994 singly by Jamie Walters

Single by Jamie Walters

from the album Jamie Walters
- B-side: "I Know the Game"
- Released: October 11, 1994
- Studio: Tyrell (Los Angeles)
- Genre: Pop rock
- Length: 4:25
- Label: Atlantic
- Songwriters: Jamie Walters; Stephanie Tyrell; Kevin Savigar; Steve Tyrell
- Producer: Steve Tyrell

Jamie Walters singles chronology
"Hold On" (1994)	"Why" (1995)

"Hold On" is the debut single by the American singer and actor Jamie Walters. Written by Walters, Stephanie Tyrell, Kevin Savigar, and Steve Tyrell, and produced by the lattermost, it was released on October 11, 1994, via Atlantic Records as the lead single taken from his first studio album Jamie Walters (1994). It is his most successful single to date, peaking at number 16 on the US Billboard Hot 100 and cracked the top ten in Scandinavia, Canada, New Zealand, and the US Cash Box charts.

== Composition ==
"Hold On" is a somber pop rock number in the key of C major that has a tempo of 126 BPM.

== Music video ==
The music video for "Hold On" was added to MTV's playlists for the week of February 5, 1995.

== Track listings and formats ==
US cassette single

1. "Hold On" – 4:25
2. "I Know the Game" – 4:05

European CD single

1. "Hold On" (Edit) – 3:58
2. "Hold On" (LP Version) – 4:25
3. "I Know the Game" – 4:05

== Personnel ==
Taken from the Jamie Walters booklet.

- Russ Kunkel – drums and percussion
- Leland Sklar – bass
- Dean Parks, Bob Mann, Michael Landau – guitars
- Michael Landau – guitar solo
- Kevin Savigar – keyboards
- Mike Finnigan – Hammond B-3
- Marlena Jeter, Mortonetti Jenkins, Alex Brown – background vocals
- David Palmer – harmony vocal

== Charts ==
=== Weekly charts ===
Weekly chart performance for "Hold On"
Chart (1994–1996)	Peak position
Australia (ARIA)	76
Austria (Ö3 Austria Top 40)	18
Canada Top Singles (RPM)	9
Canada Adult Contemporary (RPM)	6
Denmark (IFPI)	5
Europe (Eurochart Hot 100)	58
Finland (Suomen virallinen lista)	5
Germany (GfK)	83
Iceland (Íslenski Listinn Topp 40)	19
Netherlands (Single Top 100)	41
New Zealand (Recorded Music NZ)	7
Norway (VG-lista)	3
Sweden (Sverigetopplistan)	2
US Billboard Hot 100	16
US Adult Contemporary (Billboard)	9
US Top 40/Mainstream (Billboard)	5
US Cash Box Top 100	9
US AC (Radio & Records)	19
US Pop/CHR (Radio & Records)	4
US Hot AC/Adult CHR (Radio & Records)	6

=== Year-end charts ===
1995 year-end chart performance for "Hold On"
Chart (1995)	Position
Canada Top Singles (RPM)	69
Canada Adult Contemporary (RPM)	50
New Zealand (RIANZ)	18
Sweden (Topplistan)	21
US Billboard Hot 100	52
US Adult Contemporary (Billboard)	22
US Top 40/Mainstream (Billboard)	20
US AC (Radio & Records)	51
US CHR/Pop (Radio & Records)	15
US Hot AC (Radio & Records)	22
