= Jamie Walters (album) =

Studio album by Jamie Walters
- Released: September 20, 1994
- Studio: Tyrell Studios (Los Angeles, California)
- Genre: Pop rock
- Length: 44:20
- Label: Atlantic
- Producer: Steve Tyrell

Jamie Walters chronology
Jamie Walters (1994)	Ride (1997)

Singles from Jamie Walters
- 1. "Hold On" Released: October 11, 1994; 2. "Why" Released: July 18, 1995

Jamie Walters is the self-titled debut from American actor and singer, Jamie Walters. The album's first single "Hold On", reached number 16 on the Billboard Hot 100. It placed at number 52 on the Billboard Year-End Hot 100 singles of 1995 list. The album sold over one million copies and was certified platinum in the United States.

== Critical reception ==
Professional ratings
Review scores
Source	Rating
AllMusic	3/5 stars

Sara Sytsma of AllMusic gave it three out of five stars and was given an "Album Pick" tag, calling it "a well-produced collection of mainstream, adult contemporary-oriented pop/rock". But Sytsma commented that Walters "doesn't possess a great voice, but the producers of the album are quite talented; in their hands, he sounds very good."

== Tour ==
Walters toured the US and Europe to support the album. The European leg of the tour featured performances that consisted of just Walters and Reb Beach on acoustic guitars.

When asked about this tour, Reb Beach answered:

"Jamie Walters was THE funnest tour I ever did. It was just Jamie and I, first class all the way through Europe. Jamie and I became great friends and we wrote the song "You" together. With the exception of Kip Winger, he is probably my favorite person in the world (meaning "male person")."

== Track listing ==
Jamie Walters track listing
No.	Title	Writer(s)	Length
1.	"Hold On"	Steve Tyrell; Kevin Savigar; Stephanie Tyrell; Jamie Walters	4:25
2.	"The Comfort of Strangers"	Tyrell; Savigar; Tyrell	4:57
3.	"The Distance"	Tyrell; Savigar; Tyrell	4:52
4.	"Why"	Zachary Throne; Walters	3:48
5.	"Drive Me"	Tyrell; Michael Landau; Savigar; Tyrell	4:46
6.	"Neutral Ground"	Randall Bramblett; Davis Causey	4:21
7.	"I Know the Game"	Tyrell; Savigar; Tyrell	4:05
8.	"Release Me"	Graham Parker	3:58
9.	"No Rhyme, No Reason"	Bramblett; Causey	4:18
10.	"Perfect World"	Tyrell; Savigar; Tyrell	4:50

== Personnel ==
Adapted credits from the album's liner notes.

Musicians and Vocalists

- Jamie Walters – vocals, guitars (4), harmonica (4), backing vocals (4)
- Kevin Savigar – keyboards (1–3, 5–8, 10), percussion (5)
- Mike Finnigan – Hammond B3 organ (1, 4, 8)
- Guy Moon – keyboards (6, 9)
- Michael Landau – guitars (1, 2, 5–10), guitar solo (1, 8), acoustic guitar (3)
- Dean Parks – guitars (1, 3), guitar solo (3)
- Bob Mann – guitars (1, 8)
- Zachary Throne – guitars (4), guitar solo (4), bass (4), percussion (4), backing vocals (4)
- Leland Sklar – bass (1–3, 6, 8–10)
- John Pierce – bass (5, 7)
- Russ Kunkel – drums (1–4, 6, 8–10), percussion (1, 2)
- Gary Mallaber – percussion (3, 5, 6), drums (5, 7)
- Roy Campanella III – loops (6), sampler (6)
- David Palmer – harmony vocals (1, 2, 5, 7, 9, 10), backing vocals (3, 10)
- Alex Brown – backing vocals (1, 5–9)
- Mortonette Jenkins – backing vocals (1, 5–9)
- Marlena Jeter – backing vocals (1, 5–9)
- Vonda Shepard – featured backing vocals (3)
- Merry Clayton – featured backing vocals (6)
- Dee Harvey – featured backing vocals (6)
- Steve Tyrell – backing vocals (6, 9)
- Dr. John – featured backing vocals (8)
- Barry Coffing – backing vocals (10)

Production

- Kevin Williamson – A&R
- Steve Tyrell – producer, additional engineer
- Stephanie Tyrell – associate album producer
- David Schober – recording
- Michael Knobloch – assistant engineer, album coordinator
- Grant Conway – additional engineer
- David Hines – additional engineer
- Max Norman – additional engineer
- Michael C. Ross – additional engineer
- Gabe Veltri – additional engineer
- Chris Lord-Alge – mixing
- Gavin Lurssen – mastering at The Mastering Lab (Hollywood, California)
- Julia Russell – production assistant
- Andy Forshee – album coordinator
- Mark Heyes – album coordinator
- Robin Cottle – art direction
- Brad Hitz – photography
- Charlie Roberts – illustration

== Charts ==
Chart performance for Jamie Walters
Chart (1995)	Peak position
US Billboard 200	70

== Certifications ==
Certifications for Jamie Walters
Region	Certification	Certified units/sales
Denmark (IFPI Danmark)	Platinum	50,000^{^}
Finland (Musiikkituottajat)	Platinum	43,714
^{^} Shipments figures based on certification alone.
