= Believed =

Believed may refer to:

- Believed (album), a 2002 album by Jamie Walters
- Believed (podcast), a documentary miniseries podcast
- Believed, a song by Lauv from the album How I'm Feeling

== See also ==
- Believe (disambiguation)
