= Ride (Jamie Walters album) =

Studio album by Jamie Walters
- Released: June 24, 1997
- Studio: Tyrell Studios, Capitol Studios and A&M Studios (Hollywood, California); Image Recording Studios (Los Angeles, California)
- Length: 46:42
- Label: Atlantic
- Producer: Steve Tyrell

Jamie Walters chronology
Jamie Walters (1994)	Ride (1997)	Believed (2002)

Professional ratings
Review scores
Source	Rating
AllMusic	3/5 stars

Ride is the second album by the American pop singer-songwriter, actor Jamie Walters. It was released on June 24, 1997, through Atlantic Records.

== Track listing ==
No.	Title	Writer(s)	Length
1.	"Reckless"	Kevin Savigar; Stephanie Tyrell; Steve Tyrell	4:09
2.	"Fly On Sweet Angel"	Jamie Walters; Savigar; Tyrell; Tyrell	4:21
3.	"I'd Do Anything for You"	Walters; Savigar; Tyrell; Tyrell	4:21
4.	"Winona"	Matthew Sweet	4:02
5.	"In Between"	Walters; Tyrell	3:59
6.	"The Other Side"	Walters; Savigar	4:23
7.	"Nobody But You"	Walters; Savigar; Tyrell; Tyrell	4:47
8.	"Long Way Down"	Walters; Michael Landau; Tyrell; Tyrell	4:10
9.	"Dog on a Chain"	Barry Coffing; Walters; Savigar; Tyrell; Tyrell	4:01
10.	"You"	Walters; Reb Beach; Tyrell	4:45
11.	"The Great Escape"	Walters	3:38

== Personnel ==
- Jamie Walters – lead vocals, guitars (2–5, 10, 11), acoustic guitar (6)
- Mike Finnigan – Hammond B3 organ (1, 3, 4), backing vocals (5, 7, 10, 11)
- Kevin Savigar – Wurlitzer electric piano (1, 2, 7, 9), acoustic piano (3, 7), percussion programming (3, 6, 9), synthesizer programming (9)
- Jim Cox – Wurlitzer electric piano (5, 9, 10), Hammond B3 organ (6, 7), acoustic piano (10)
- Michael Landau – guitars, guitar solo (2, 4–6, 10, 11)
- John Pierce – bass (1)
- Leland Sklar – bass (2–11)
- Gary Mallaber – drums (1, 4, 5, 10, 11)
- Russ Kunkel – drums (2, 8, 9)
- Abe Laboriel Jr. – drums (3, 6, 7)
- Paul Buckmaster – string arrangements and conductor
- Zachary Throne – harmony vocals (1), backing vocals (2–4, 6, 8, 9)
- Alex Brown – backing vocals (1, 5, 7)
- Mortonette Jenkins – backing vocals (1, 5, 7)
- Marlena Jeter – backing vocals (1, 5, 7)
- Steve Tyrell – backing vocals (8)

=== Production ===
- Kevin Williamson – A&R
- Steve Tyrell – producer, engineer
- Gabe Veltri – engineer
- Jeffrey "Woody" Woodruff – engineer
- Lynn Fuston – additional engineer
- Christopher Harris – additional engineer
- Alan Hirshberg – additional engineer
- Michael C. Ross – additional engineer
- Chris Lord-Alge – mixing
- Doug Sax – mastering at The Mastering Lab (Hollywood, California)
- Andrea Forshee – album coordinator
- Stephanie Fink – production assistant
- Joe Fischer – production assistant
- Robbie McPherson – production assistant
- Thomas Bricker – art direction, design
- Tina Bilao – photography
- Jill Greenberg – inlay photography

== In popular culture ==
The song "Reckless" was performed by Walters on the season 6 episode of Beverly Hills, 90210 called "Ray of Hope" in 1996. Walters returned to the show later that year and performed the song "The Great Escape" on the episode "Lost in Las Vegas" from season 7.

== Tour ==
Walters toured the US and Europe in support of Ride. The performances consisted of only Walters and Zach Throne on acoustic guitars. There were also some dates in Europe with a full band.
