= Believed (album) =

Studio album by Jamie Walters
- Released: June 26, 2002
- Studio: Tyrell Studios (Hollywood, California)
- Length: 47:49
- Label: Leisure Records
- Producer: Jamie Walters; Ronan Chris Murphy

Jamie Walters chronology
Ride (1997)	Believed (2002)

Believed is the third and final album by American pop singer-songwriter, actor Jamie Walters with his band, Elco. It was released through indie label Leisure Records.

== Track listing ==
All songs written by Jamie Walters, except where noted.

1. "Evilyn" – 4:29
2. "Just Like You" – 3:04
3. "Butter" – 5:14
4. "Catch Me" – 5:16
5. "5ive" – 4:31
6. "Better Off Dead" – 3:54
7. "Such a Drag" – 4:22
8. "Marooned" – 3:48
9. "Sparkling Light" – 4:28
10. "Wonderland" (Ian Spencer, Jamie Walters) – 3:58
11. "Superman" – 4:45

== Personnel ==
- Jamie Walters – vocals, guitars
- Louis Allen – string bass (4), string bass arrangements (4)

Additional musicians

- Adrian Andres
- Ian Spencer
- Jeremy Sweet
- Ronan Chris Murphy
- Noah Deats
- Gary Mallaber
- Derek Syverud
- Paul Trudeau
- Tina Bilao
- Robbie Ann McPherson
- Zachary Throne

=== Production ===
- Joe Fischer – executive producer
- Jamie Walters – album producer, photography
- Ronan Chris Murphy – additional production, mixing, producer (4)
- Barry Corliss – mastering at Master Works (Seattle, Washington)
- Scott Ford – album artwork
- Patty Laron – photography
