= How Do You Talk to an Angel =

Theme of American television series The Heights

Single by the Heights

from the album The Heights (Music from the Television Show)
- B-side: "Walkin' Nerve"
- Released: September 5, 1992
- Genre: Pop
- Length: 3:48
- Label: Capitol
- Songwriters: Barry Coffing; Steve Tyrell; Stephanie Tyrell
- Producer: Steve Tyrell

"How Do You Talk to an Angel" is a song written by Steve Tyrell, Barry Coffing, and Stephanie Tyrell. It was the theme for the American TV series The Heights. The series follows the fictional band the Heights, and the ballad, recorded by the cast, was released as a single. It reached No. 1 on the US Billboard Hot 100 on November 14, 1992, but the series was canceled exactly one week after the song fell from its number-one position. It also topped the US Cash Box Top 100. Jamie Walters was the lead singer, with supporting vocals by cast mates Shawn David Thompson, Cheryl Pollak, Charlotte Ross and Zachary Throne.

In 1993, the song was nominated for an Emmy Award for "Outstanding Individual Achievement in Music and Lyrics". The Emmy went to the song "Sorry I Asked" by Kander and Ebb from Liza Minnelli Live from Radio City Music Hall. No follow-up singles under the Heights name were ever commercially released. Promo CDs were issued to radio for a follow-up "I'm Still on Your Side", but there was no commercial issue for this track as a single.

Walters, the lead singer on the single and the lead actor on the show, later had a No. 16 Hot 100 hit with his single "Hold On" in 1994. It was his only subsequent chart appearance.

== Personnel ==
- Jamie Walters: lead vocals
- Steve Tyrell: producer, arranger
- Bob Mann: arranger, acoustic/electric guitar (inc. solo)
- Michael Landau: electric guitars
- Mike Finnigan: piano
- John "JR" Robinson: drums
- Leland Sklar: bass
- Brandon Fields: saxophone
- Barry Coffing, Guy Moon: keyboards
- Alex Desert, Charlotte Ross, Cheryl Pollak, Jamie Walters, Ken Garito, Shawn Thompson, Zachary Throne: background vocals

== Charts ==
=== Weekly charts ===
Weekly chart performance for "How Do You Talk to an Angel"
Chart (1992–1993)	Peak position
Australia (ARIA)	3
Belgium (Ultratop 50 Flanders)	12
Canada Retail Singles (The Record)	1
Canada Top Singles (RPM)	2
Canada Adult Contemporary (RPM)	12
Germany (GfK)	47
Iceland (Íslenski Listinn Topp 40)	22
Netherlands (Dutch Top 40 Tipparade)	16
Netherlands (Single Top 100)	60
US Billboard Hot 100	1
US Adult Contemporary (Billboard)	8
US Top 40/Mainstream (Billboard)	1
US Top 40/Rhythm-Crossover (Billboard)	13
US Cash Box Top 100	1

=== Year-end charts ===
1992 year-end chart performance for "How Do You Talk to an Angel"
Chart (1992)	Position
Canada Adult Contemporary (RPM)	93
US Billboard Hot 100	59

1993 year-end chart performance for "How Do You Talk to an Angel"
Chart (1993)	Position
Australia (ARIA)	24
Canada Top Singles (RPM)	84
Canada Adult Contemporary (RPM)	86
US Billboard Hot 100	80
US Cash Box Top 100	34

=== Decade-end charts ===
Decade-end chart performance for "How Do You Talk to an Angel
Chart (1990–1999)	Position
Canada (Nielsen SoundScan)	77

== Certifications ==
Certifications and sales for "How Do You Talk to an Angel"
Region	Certification	Certified units/sales
Australia (ARIA)	Gold	35,000^{^}
United States (RIAA)	Gold	500,000^{^}
^{^} Shipments figures based on certification alone.

== Release history ==
Release dates and formats for "How Do You Talk to an Angel"
Region	Date	Format(s)	Label(s)	Ref.
United States	September 21, 1992	—N/a	Capitol	
Japan	December 24, 1992	Mini-CD	Capitol	
Australia	January 18, 1993	CD; cassette	Capitol; EMI	
