= The Heights (American TV series) =

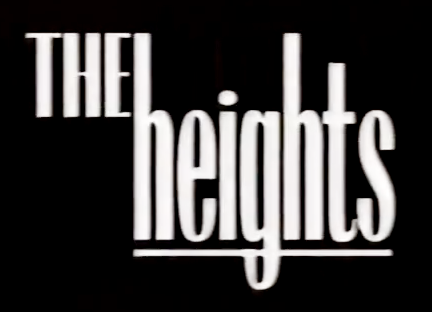
- Genre: Musical drama
- Created by: Eric Roth; Tony Spiridakis
- Starring: Jamie Walters; Camille Saviola; Alex Désert; Charlotte Ross; Zachary Throne
- Theme music composer: Barry Coffing; Steve Tyrell; Stephanie Tyrell
- Opening theme: "How Do You Talk to an Angel" performed by the Heights
- Composers: Shawn David Thompson, Zachary Throne, Jamie Walters
- Country of origin: United States
- Original language: English
- No. of seasons: 1
- No. of episodes: 13 (1 unaired)

Production
- Executive producer: Tony Spiridakis
- Producers: Aaron Spelling; E. Duke Vincent
- Editor: Michael B. Hoggan
- Camera setup: Single-camera
- Running time: 45–48 minutes
- Production company: Spelling Television

Original release
- Network: Fox
- Release: August 27 – November 26, 1992

The Heights is an American musical drama series that aired Thursday at 9:00 pm on Fox from August 27 to November 26, 1992.

== Synopsis ==
The Heights centered on a fictional band (also called The Heights) made up of mostly working-class young adults. Episodes regularly featured one of their songs.

The eventual theme song for the show, "How Do You Talk to an Angel" (with cast member Jamie Walters as lead singer, and supporting vocals by cast mates Shawn David Thompson, Cheryl Pollak, Charlotte Ross and Zachary Throne), went to number one on the Billboard Hot 100 chart, and was the first song from a television show to top the Hot 100 since 1985, (Note: In 1985, Jan Hammer reached No. 1 with the instrumental "Miami Vice Theme", from the television series Miami Vice.) as well as the first song by a fictional band to top the Hot 100 since 1969. (Note: In 1969, fictional band The Archies, from the animated television series The Archie Show, reached No. 1 with "Sugar, Sugar".) The Heights premiered on August 27, 1992, to low ratings, and never gained a substantial audience. Fox canceled the series less than a week after the theme song fell from the number one spot.

== Cast ==
- Ray Aranha as Mr. Mike Lee, Stan's father
- Alex Désert as Stan Lee, bass player
- Ken Garito as Arthur "Dizzy" Mazelli, drummer
- Cheryl Pollak as Rita MacDougal, sax player
- Donnelly Rhodes as Harry Abramowitz, Jodie's father
- Charlotte Ross as Hope Linden, guitarist
- Shawn David Thompson as J.T. Banks, lead singer
- Zachary Throne as Lenny Wieckowski, keyboardist
- Tasia Valenza as Jodie Abramowitz, Dizzy's girlfriend
- Jamie Walters as Alex O'Brien, singer-songwriter

On the soundtrack album, session musicians played most of the backing tracks, although the cast sang their own vocals. On the single "How Do You Talk to an Angel", the instrumentation was entirely performed by session musicians, while the vocals were entirely performed by all seven "Heights" members (with Jamie Walters on lead). However, some of the actors were actually also musicians, and on a few album tracks, Jamie Walters played guitar, Zachary Throne guitars, keyboards and bass, Cheryl Pollak saxophone and Ken Garito drums, percussion and guitar.

== Episodes ==
No.	Title	Directed by	Written by	Original release date
1	"Talk to an Angel"	Donald Petrie	Tony Spiridakis	August 27, 1992
2	"Children of the Night"	Sandy Smolan	Tony Spiridakis	September 3, 1992
3	"Decisions"	John Nicolella	Matt Dearborn	September 10, 1992
4	"Natalie"	Donald Petrie	Tony Spiridakis	September 17, 1992
5	"Shooting Stars"	John Nicolella	Paris Qualles	September 24, 1992
6	"Flashback"	Unknown	James Kramer	October 1, 1992
7	"So Hot"	James Hayman	James Kramer & Matt Dearborn	October 22, 1992
8	"On the Road"	Jefferson Kibbee	Story by : Janna King; Teleplay by : Tony Spiridakis	October 29, 1992
9	"The Big Day"	Jefferson Kibbee	Tony Spiridakis	November 5, 1992
10	"Honeymoon"	Steven Robman	Paris Qualles	November 12, 1992
11	"Strains"	Jefferson Kibbee	Tony Spiridakis & Matt Dearborn	November 19, 1992
12	"Nightmares"	John Nicolella	Story by : James Kramer; Teleplay by : James Kramer & Paris Qualles	November 26, 1992
13	"The Big Chance"	Steven Robman	Story by : Matt Dearborn; Teleplay by : Tony Spiridakis & Matt Dearborn	N/A

== Awards and nominations ==
Year	Award	Category	Recipient	Result
1993	BMI Film & TV Awards	Special Recognition	Barry Coffing, Stephanie Tyrell, and Steve Tyrell; For the song "How Do You Talk to an Angel"	Won
1993	Primetime Emmy Award	Outstanding Individual Achievement in Music and Lyrics	Barry Coffing, Stephanie Tyrell, and Steve Tyrell; For the song "How Do You Talk to an Angel"	Nominated

== See also ==
- Catwalk, a 1992–94 TV series about a fictional band, with several of the same songwriters called the Heights
- The Monkees, a 1966–68 comedy television series about a fictional band – who went on to achieve huge success in real life
- California Dreams, a 1992–96 Saturday morning series about a fictional band which also had music by Steve Tyrell, and which used Height's theme co-writer Barry Coffing and cast member Zachary Thorne as singing voices for two of the characters
- Sin City Sinners, a Las Vegas-based group of musicians featuring actor Zachary Throne, who would regularly perform "How Do You Talk to an Angel" in concerts, and rerecorded the song on one of their albums
