= Jamie Walters =

American actor and singer (born 1969)

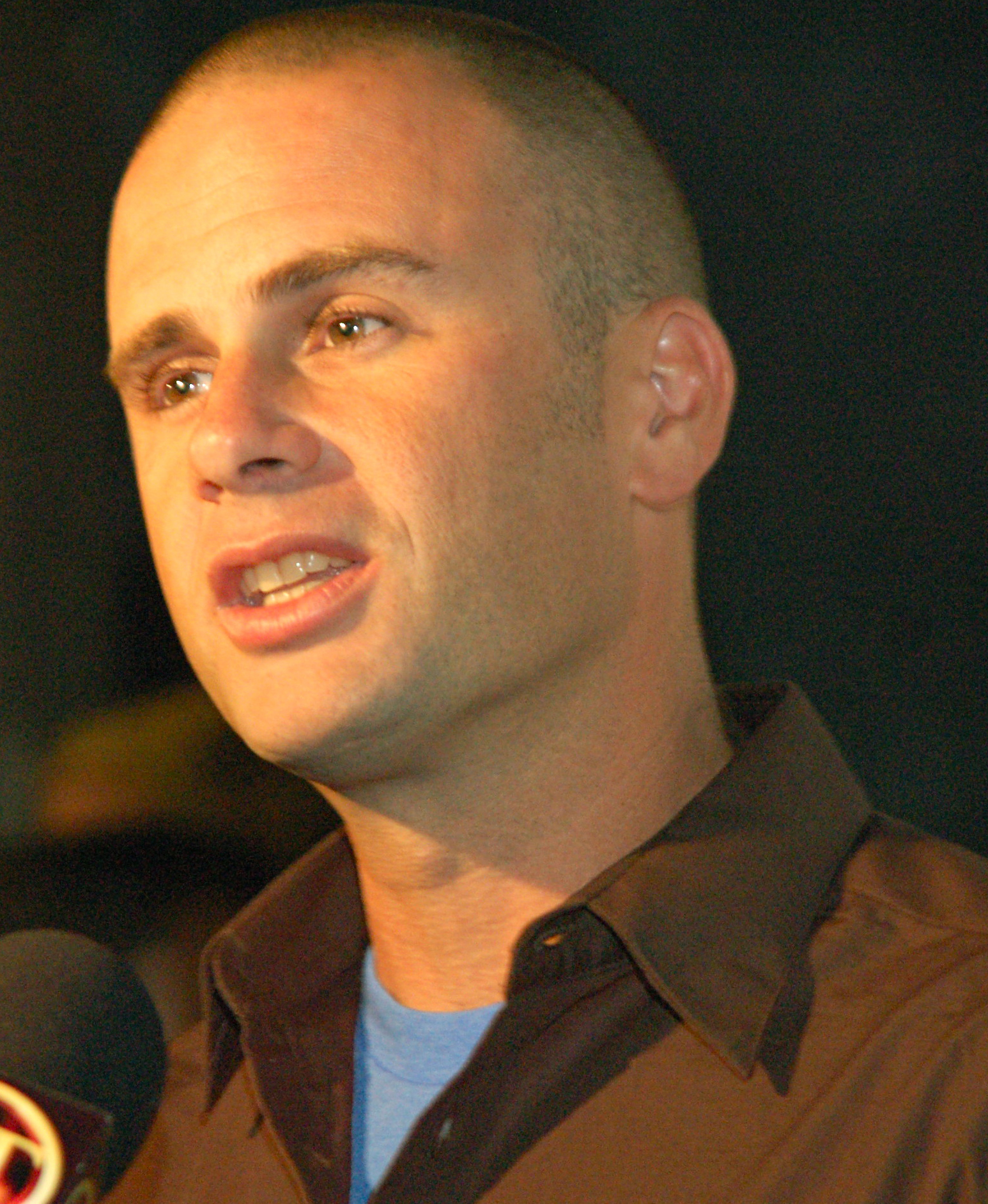
- Walters in 2008

Background information
- Born: James Leland Walters Jr. June 13, 1969 (age 57); Boston, Massachusetts, U.S.
- Origin: Marblehead, Massachusetts
- Genres: Pop rock
- Occupations: Actor, singer, firefighter
- Years active: 1982–2003, 2019
- Labels: Capitol, Atlantic
- Spouse: Patricia Walters (m. 2002; div. 2015)
- Website: MySpace

James Leland Walters Jr. (born June 13, 1969) is an American actor and singer, best known for his roles on Beverly Hills, 90210 and The Heights and singing lead vocal on "How Do You Talk to an Angel".

== Career ==
Walters was born in Boston, Massachusetts, and grew up in Marblehead, Massachusetts. After graduating from high school, he attended New York University and studied film for two years and studied acting at The Actors Space in New York City.

While attending college, he was discovered at a bank by a casting agent who placed him in three high-profile commercials for Levi's 501 Jeans. He then moved to Los Angeles to pursue an acting and musical career. He played a bit role on Everyday Heroes. His film debut came in 1991 with the movie Shout, alongside John Travolta, Heather Graham, and Gwyneth Paltrow. Walters performed the song "Rockin' the Pad" on the Shout soundtrack album.

In 1992, Aaron Spelling cast Walters as the lead on the Fox series The Heights, in which he also sang the theme song "How Do You Talk to an Angel?." The single reached number 1 on the Billboard Hot 100 on November 14, 1992. It was also nominated for an Emmy Award for "Outstanding Individual Achievement in Music and Lyrics". (The award went to Liza Minnelli.) The show was canceled by Fox, but it launched his music career when Atlantic Records took an interest in Walters and signed him to a recording contract.

In October 1994, he started playing Ray Pruit on Beverly Hills, 90210; he was the musician-boyfriend of Donna (played by Tori Spelling), a role he played for one season.

On September 20, 1994, Walters released his self-titled debut album Jamie Walters. The first single from the album, "Hold On", peaked at number 16 on the Billboard Hot 100, and number 76 in Australia. The album sold over 1 million copies and was certified platinum.

In 1997, he released his second album Ride. It was certified gold. A third album, Believed, followed in 2002. In 2009, he appeared in the VH1 reality show Confessions of a Teen Idol, in which former teen idols attempt to resurrect their careers.

He became a firefighter and paramedic in 2002. He worked for the Los Angeles Fire Department.

== Personal life ==
Walters began dating actress Drew Barrymore, then 17 years old, in March 1992, and became engaged that June. They broke off their engagement and split in 1993.

In 2002, Walters married Patricia Walters; they have three children. She filed for divorce in 2015.

Walters has four children.

== Filmography ==
=== Film ===
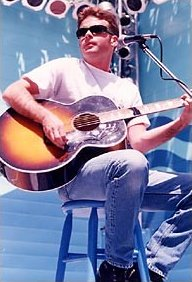
Walters at Six Flags in 1996

Year	Title	Role	Notes
1990	Everyday Heroes	Erik Linderman	TV movie
1991	Bed & Breakfast	Mitch	
1991	Shout	Jesse Tucker	
1994	Vanishing Son II	Reggie Valmont	TV movie
1994	Vanishing Son IV	Reggie Valmont	TV movie
1995	Burnzy's Last Call	Shannon	
1996	God's Lonely Man	Hustler	
2000	The Mumbo Jumbo	Thomas Doubting	

=== Television ===
Year	Title	Role	Notes
1989, 1992	Quantum Leap	Young Max; Al 'Bingo' Calavicci	Episodes: "Genesis: Part 1" & "A Leap for Lisa"
1991–1992	The Young Riders	Frank James	Episodes: "The Initiation" & "'Til Death Do Us Part: Parts 1 & 2"
1992	The Heights	Alex O'Brien	
1994–1996	Beverly Hills, 90210	Ray Pruit	Main role
1999	To Serve and Protect	Jeremy	2 episodes
2001	Dead Last	Vance Harmon	Episode: "To Live and Amulet Die"
2019	BH90210	Himself	Episode: "Picture's Up"

== Discography ==
=== Studio albums ===
- Jamie Walters (1994)
- Ride (1997)
- Believed (2002)

=== Singles ===
List of singles, with selected chart positions
Title	Year	Peak chart positions										Album
Title	Year	AUS	AUT	CAN	FIN	GER	NED	NZ	NOR	SWE	US	Album
"Hold On"	1994	76	18	9	5	83	41	7	3	2	16	Jamie Walters
"Why"	1995	—	—	—	—	—	—	—	—	—	105	Jamie Walters
"Perfect World"	1995	—	—	—	—	—	—	—	—	—	—	Jamie Walters
"Reckless"	1997	—	—	—	—	—	—	—	—	—	—	Ride
"I'd Do Anything for You"	1997	—	—	—	—	—	—	—	—	—	—	Ride
"—" denotes releases that did not chart
