= Stephanie Tyrell =

- Also known as: Stefanie Tyrell
- Born: Stephanie Georgia Manteris; March 20, 1949; Detroit, Michigan, United States
- Died: October 27, 2003 (aged 54) Los Angeles, California, United States
- Occupations: Record producer; television composer; songwriter

Stephanie Georgia Manteris Tyrell (March 20, 1949 – October 27, 2003) was an American record producer, television composer, songwriter, and the wife of jazz composer, Steve Tyrell. She produced the soundtrack albums for The Brady Bunch Movie, Mystic Pizza and the 1991 version of Father of the Bride. She was best known for writing "How Do You Talk to an Angel", the one-hit wonder from Fox's The Heights.

Tyrell died of colorectal cancer on October 27, 2003.

== Discography ==
=== Soundtracks ===
- Midnight Crossing (1988)
- Mystic Pizza (1988)
- Getting It Right (1989)
- Gravedale High (Unknown episodes, 1990)
- California Dreams (Unknown episodes, 1992)
- The Heights (Unknown episodes, 1992)
- Family Prayers (1993)
- The Brady Bunch Movie (1995)
- A Very Brady Sequel (1996)

=== Theme songs ===
- Teen Wolf (1986–1987)
- The Famous Teddy Z (1989–1990)

== Awards and nominations ==
Year	Award	Result	Category	Series
1993	Creative Arts Emmy Award	Nominated	Outstanding Individual Achievement in Music and Lyrics	The Heights (For the song "How Do You Talk to an Angel"; shared with Barry Coffing and Steve Tyrell)
1993	BMI Film & TV Awards	Won	Special Recognition	The Heights (For the song "How Do You Talk to an Angel"; shared with Barry Coffing and Steve Tyrell)
