= Steve Tyrell =

US-American singer and record producer

- Born: Stephen Louis Bilao III; Palo Pinto County, Texas, U.S.
- Genres: Jazz; pop; rock
- Occupations: Singer; record producer
- Years active: 1970–present
- Label: Concord
- Website: stevetyrell.com

Stephen Louis Bilao III is an American singer and record producer. He won a 2004 Grammy Award as the producer of the Rod Stewart studio album Stardust: The Great American Songbook, Volume III. He also hosts a jazz radio program on KKJZ at California State University, Long Beach.

Tyrell was head of artists and repertoire and promotion at Scepter Records. He produced B. J. Thomas' hit "Rock and Roll Lullaby." He wrote "How Do You Talk to an Angel" for the TV show The Heights, "Hold On" for Jamie Walters, "It's Only Love" for B. J. and Elvis Presley, and all the songs in the teen sitcom California Dreams.

He sang "The Way You Look Tonight" on the soundtrack for Father of the Bride (1991). Tyrell inherited the annual holiday residency at the Carlyle Hotel in Manhattan from cabaret singer Bobby Short.

== Discography ==
- A New Standard (Atlantic, 1999)
- Standard Time (Columbia, 2001)
- This Time of the Year (Columbia, 2002)
- This Guy's in Love (Columbia, 2003)
- Songs of Sinatra (Hollywood, 2005)
- The Disney Standards (Walt Disney, 2006)
- Back to Bacharach (Koch, 2008)
- It's Magic: The Songs of Sammy Cahn (Concord, 2013)
- That Lovin' Feeling (Concord, 2015)
- A Song for You (EastWest, 2018)
- Shades of Ray: The Songs of Ray Charles (Arts Music/Warner, 2019)
