= Teenage Dream: The Complete Confection =

Studio album (reissue) by Katy Perry
- Released: March 23, 2012
- Studios: Conway, Hollywood; Henson, Hollywood; Playback, Santa Barbara; Roc the Mic, New York City; Rocket Carousel, Los Angeles; Silent Sound, Atlanta; Studio at the Palms, Las Vegas; Boom Boom Room, Burbank; Triangle Sound, Atlanta; NightBird (West Hollywood); Hit Factory Criteria (Miami, FL)
- Genre: Pop
- Length: 77:01
- Label: Capitol
- Producers: Ammo; Benny Blanco; Jon Brion; Cirkut; Dr. Luke; Max Martin; C. "Tricky" Stewart; Stargate; Sandy Vee; Tommie Sunshine; Greg Wells

Katy Perry chronology
Teenage Dream (2010)	Teenage Dream: The Complete Confection (2012)	Prism (2013)

Singles from Teenage Dream: The Complete Confection
- 1. "Part of Me" Released: February 13, 2012; 2. "Wide Awake" Released: May 22, 2012

Teenage Dream: The Complete Confection is a reissue of American singer-songwriter Katy Perry's third studio album, Teenage Dream (2010). It was released on March 23, 2012, by Capitol Records, nearly two years after the original album. Perry collaborated with producers including Tricky Stewart to refine leftover material from the recording sessions at Playback Recording Studio for Teenage Dream. The final product features three newly recorded songs, which incorporate pop styles previously seen in the original album, an acoustic version of "The One That Got Away" and three additional official remixes featuring Missy Elliott, Kanye West, and Tommie Sunshine.

Two singles were released from Teenage Dream: The Complete Confection. The lead single, "Part of Me", debuted at number one on the US Billboard Hot 100, while the second single, "Wide Awake", peaked at number two in the country. Both songs were eventually certified quintuple-platinum by the Recording Industry Association of America (RIAA). The Kanye West remix of "E.T." was previously released as a single and peaked at the top of the US Billboard Hot 100. The record was further promoted with live performances during the 54th Annual Grammy Awards and the 2012 Billboard Music Awards, in addition to the autobiographical documentary film Katy Perry: Part of Me (2012).

Upon its release, Teenage Dream: The Complete Confection was met with generally favorable reviews from music critics, who were ambivalent towards the new songs' production but questioned the decision to reissue Teenage Dream. As an independent release, the reissue charted within the top 10 in Australia, New Zealand, the United Kingdom, and the United States as well as the top 20 in Belgium (Flanders), Finland, and France. It sold one million copies globally by the end of 2012 and received multi-Platinum certifications in Australia, Denmark, and New Zealand.

== Background ==
In August 2010, Perry released her third studio album Teenage Dream. While recording the record, she collaborated with producers including Dr. Luke and Max Martin. Following its release, Teenage Dream became a worldwide commercial success; it debuted at number one on both the U.S. Billboard 200 and the UK Albums Chart, and charted highly in other international territories. The project was met with generally mixed reviews from music critics, receiving an average score of 52, based on 19 reviews on Metacritic, indicating "generally mixed or average reviews". After its singles "California Gurls", "Teenage Dream", "Firework", "E.T.", and "Last Friday Night (T.G.I.F.)" each reached the top of the U.S. Billboard Hot 100, Teenage Dream became the second album in history to produce five number-one singles on the chart after Michael Jackson's Bad.

In October 2011, producer Tricky Stewart confirmed that he was working with Perry to refine leftover material from Teenage Dream recording sessions for "something special she has going on". Perry officially announced Teenage Dream: The Complete Confection in February 2012, describing it as the "complete story" of the original album. She added that the expanded album would contain three newly recorded songs and four additional remixes to supplement the standard edition of the original album. "It was an incredible honor to tie [Jackson's] Billboard Hot 100 record, but I'm moving forward and had a few things left to get off my chest," she said.

== New material ==
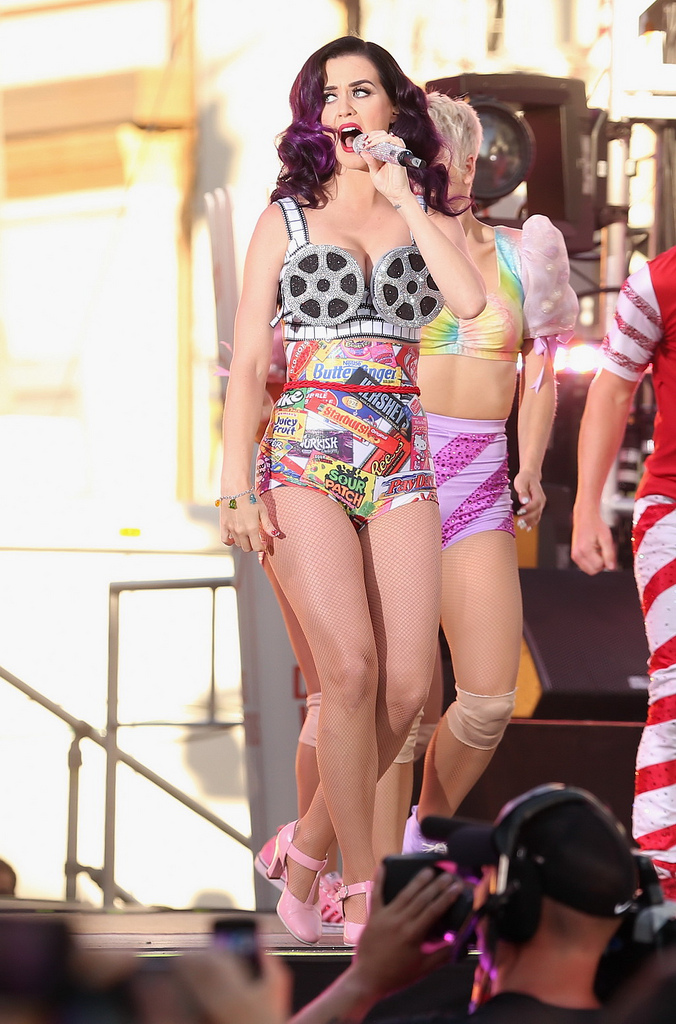
Perry performing "Part of Me" at the premiere of Katy Perry: Part of Me

Tricky Stewart stated that he and Perry "always knew that the records [they] created were special [and] at the time it was more contractual obligation [that they did not make the album]". He elaborated that they were originally excluded from the project to balance the original record with tracks from other producers, in addition to Perry not needing more songs at the time. The expanded album begins with the twelve tracks included on the standard version of Teenage Dream. The newly recorded material for the reissue, which is made just for the album, begins with an acoustic rendition of "The One That Got Away" as the thirteenth track. "Part of Me" is a power pop song that lyrically acts as an "emotional breakup anthem". It was speculated that its concept was inspired by Perry's relationship with her ex-husband Russell Brand.

"Wide Awake" is a mid-tempo pop ballad that sees inspiration from electronic and dance-pop; it lyrically discusses the end of a relationship, and was also reportedly influenced by Perry's experience with Brand. "Dressin' Up" is an uptempo, dance-rock and techno song that sees the inclusion of "over-sexualized" lyrical content. The seventeenth track is a remix of "E.T." with new verses provided by Kanye West, while the eighteenth song is a remix of "Last Friday Night (T.G.I.F.)" featuring Missy Elliott. The nineteenth and final track "Tommie Sunshine's Megasix Smash-Up" incorporates elements of Perry's earlier singles "California Gurls", "Teenage Dream", "Firework", "E.T.", "Last Friday Night (T.G.I.F.)", and "The One That Got Away".

== Singles and promotion ==
"Part of Me" was serviced as the lead single from Teenage Dream: The Complete Confection on February 13, 2012. It was met with generally favorable reviews from music critics, and became the twentieth song in the history of Billboard to debut at number one on the U.S. Billboard Hot 100, and was also certified double-platinum by the Recording Industry Association of America (RIAA) for exceeding sales of two million copies. The track also peaked at number one in New Zealand, and performed moderately in other international territories. "Wide Awake" was released as the second and final single from The Complete Confection on May 22, 2012. It peaked at number two on the Billboard Hot 100, and charted moderately worldwide. The track was nominated for the Grammy Award for Best Pop Solo Performance at the 2013 ceremony, but lost to "Set Fire to the Rain" by Adele.

Perry performed "Part of Me" at the 54th Annual Grammy Awards on February 12, 2012, and sang "Wide Awake" at the 2012 Billboard Music Awards on May 20. The Complete Confection was also promoted through the feature film Katy Perry: Part of Me (2012), which followed Perry during her California Dreams Tour. A golden ticket to attend the premiere of the film was placed inside one American copy and one Canadian copy of the record.

== Critical reception ==
Professional ratings
Review scores
Source	Rating
Entertainment Weekly	B−

Melissa Maerz of Entertainment Weekly opined that the newly recorded material "runs stale", but stated that the disc contained "some delectable musical snacks" including "Dressin' Up" and the acoustic version of "The One That Got Away". Writing for PopMatters, Jesse Fox felt that the record is "obviously not perfect", but suggested that its enjoyable nature helped Perry "[pull] it off like a bright, flamboyant, short-lived, explosive, nearly abrasive, gasps-inspiring firework." A writer for Blogcritics appreciated The Complete Confection's musical diversity, and thought that the lyrical content made the album a "journey in love, life and everything in between."

== Commercial performance ==
In the United States, Teenage Dream: The Complete Confection boosted sales of the original Teenage Dream, which consequently re-entered the top-ten of the Billboard 200 at number seven with first-week sales of 33,000 copies. This resulted in a 190%-increase from the previous tracking week, in which the original album stood at number 31. A similar situation occurred on the UK Albums Chart, where The Complete Confection helped Teenage Dream rise from number 34 to number six after the former was released.

In Australia, the Complete Confection peaked at number five and spent a total of 233 weeks on the ARIA Albums Chart. The record ranked on the ARIA year-end album charts, specifically from 2012 to 2014, then from 2020 to 2025. In 2023, the album was certified seven-times Platinum by the Australian Recording Industry Association (ARIA) for sales exceeding 490,000 units. Elsewhere, the Complete Confection charted within the top five in New Zealand, while reaching the top 20 in Belgium (Flanders), Finland, and France. The album has been certified two-times Platinum in Denmark and four-times Platinum in New Zealand. According to the International Federation of the Phonographic Industry (IFPI), The Complete Confection was the 50th highest-selling album of 2012 with one million copies sold.

== Accolades ==
Awards and nominations for Teenage Dream: The Complete Confection
Award	Category	Nominee(s)	Result	Ref.
ASCAP Music Awards	Most Performed Song	"E.T." (featuring Kanye West)	Won	
ASCAP Music Awards	Most Performed Song	"Part of Me"	Won	
ASCAP Music Awards	Most Performed Song	"Wide Awake"	Won	
ASCAP Music Awards	Most Performed Song	"Wide Awake"	Won	
55th Annual Grammy Awards	Best Pop Solo Performance	"Wide Awake"	Nominated	
2012 MTV Europe Music Awards	Best Video	"Wide Awake"	Nominated	
MTV Italian Music Awards	Best Lyrics Video	"E.T." (featuring Kanye West)	Nominated	
MTV Video Music Awards	Best Collaboration	"E.T." (featuring Kanye West)	Won	
MTV Video Music Awards	Best Art Direction	"E.T." (featuring Kanye West)	Nominated	
MTV Video Music Awards	Best Direction	"E.T." (featuring Kanye West)	Nominated	
MTV Video Music Awards	Best Editing	"E.T." (featuring Kanye West)	Nominated	
MTV Video Music Awards	Best Special Effects	"E.T." (featuring Kanye West)	Won	
MTV Video Music Awards	Video of the Year	"Wide Awake"	Nominated	
MTV Video Music Awards	Best Visual Effects	"Wide Awake"	Nominated	
MTV Video Music Awards	Best Art Direction	"Wide Awake"	Won	
MTV Video Music Awards	Best Female Video	"Part of Me"	Nominated	
MuchMusic Video Awards	International Video of the Year – Artist	"E.T." (featuring Kanye West)	Nominated	
Music Video Production Awards	Best Pop Video	"Wide Awake"	Won	
Music Video Production Awards	Best Director of a Female Artist	"Wide Awake"	Nominated	
Myx Music Awards	Favorite International Video	"Part of Me"	Nominated	
38th People's Choice Awards	Favorite Song	"E.T." (featuring Kanye West)	Won	
39th People's Choice Awards	Favorite Music Video	"Part of Me"	Won	
Radio Disney Music Awards	Best Breakup Song	"Wide Awake"	Nominated	
Teen Choice Awards	Choice Music: Single by a Female Artist	"Part of Me"	Nominated	
Teen Choice Awards	Choice Break-Up Song	"Wide Awake"	Nominated	

=== Notes ===
- Awards listed in this list is only for new tracks featured in this album as it is a reissue album of Teenage Dream. Awards related to tracks featured previously on Teenage Dream remains on its page.

== Track listing ==
Credits adapted from the liner notes of Teenage Dream: The Complete Confection.

Teenage Dream: The Complete Confection track listing
No.	Title	Writer(s)	Producer(s)	Length
1.	"Teenage Dream"	Katy Perry; Lukasz Gottwald; Max Martin; Benjamin Levin; Bonnie McKee	Dr. Luke; Benny Blanco; Martin	3:47
2.	"Last Friday Night (T.G.I.F.)"	Perry; Gottwald; Martin; McKee	Dr. Luke; Martin	3:50
3.	"California Gurls" (featuring Snoop Dogg)	Perry; Gottwald; Martin; Levin; McKee; Calvin Broadus	Dr. Luke; Blanco; Martin	3:56
4.	"Firework"	Perry; Mikkel S. Eriksen; Tor Erik Hermansen; Sandy Wilhelm; Ester Dean	Stargate; Sandy Vee	3:47
5.	"Peacock"	Perry; Eriksen; Hermansen; Dean	Stargate	3:51
6.	"Circle the Drain"	Perry; Christopher Stewart; Monte Neuble	Stewart; Kuk Harrell^{[a]}	4:32
7.	"The One That Got Away"	Perry; Gottwald; Martin	Dr. Luke; Martin	3:47
8.	"E.T."	Perry; Gottwald; Martin; Joshua Coleman	Dr. Luke; Ammo; Martin	3:26
9.	"Who Am I Living For?"	Perry; Stewart; Neuble; Brian Thomas	Stewart; Harrell^{[a]}	4:08
10.	"Pearl"	Perry; Greg Wells; Stewart	Wells	4:07
11.	"Hummingbird Heartbeat"	Perry; Stewart; Stacy Barthe; Neuble	Stewart; Harrell^{[a]}	3:32
12.	"Not Like the Movies"	Perry; Wells	Wells	4:01
13.	"The One That Got Away" (acoustic)	Perry; Gottwald; Martin	Jon Brion	4:19
14.	"Part of Me"	Perry; Gottwald; Martin; McKee	Dr. Luke; Martin; Cirkut	3:36
15.	"Wide Awake"	Perry; Gottwald; Martin; McKee; Henry Walter	Dr. Luke; Cirkut	3:41
16.	"Dressin' Up"	Perry; Stewart; Neuble; Matt Thiessen	Stewart; Harrell^{[a]}	3:43
17.	"E.T." (featuring Kanye West)	Perry; Gottwald; Martin; Coleman	Dr. Luke; Ammo; Martin	3:51
18.	"Last Friday Night (T.G.I.F.)" (featuring Missy Elliott)	Perry; Gottwald; Martin; McKee	Dr. Luke^{[b]}; Cirkut^{[c]}; Martin	3:59
19.	"Tommie Sunshine's Megasix Smash-Up"	Perry; Gottwald; Martin; Levin; McKee; Broadus; Coleman; Eriksen; Hermansen; Wilhelm; Dean	Tommie Sunshine	7:03
Total length:				1:17:01

=== Notes ===
- ^{^[a]} signifies a vocal producer
- ^{^[b]} signifies an original and remix producer
- ^{^[c]} signifies a remix producer
- "Tommie Sunshine's Megasix Smash-Up" contains elements of "California Gurls", "Teenage Dream", "Firework", "E.T.", "Last Friday Night (T.G.I.F.)" and "The One That Got Away".

== Personnel ==
Credits adapted from AllMusic.

- Kory Aaron – assistant, assistant engineer
- Ammo – drums, keyboards, producer, programming
- Chris Anokute – A&R
- Benny Blanco – drums, keyboards, producer, programming
- Tucker Bodine – assistant, assistant engineer
- Ronette Bowie – A&R
- Jon Brion – musician, producer
- Angelo Caputo – assistant
- Eric Caudieux – editing
- Ted Chung – production coordination
- Steve Churchyard – drum engineering
- Cirkut – drums, keyboards, producer, programming, remix producer
- Angelica Cob-Baehler – creative director
- Kenneth Colby – drum programming, sequencing
- Will Cotton – original paintings, photography
- Megan Dennis – production coordination
- Steven Dennis – assistant, assistant engineer
- Dr. Luke – drums, executive producer, keyboards, producer, programming, remix producer
- Missy Elliott – featured artist, vocals
- Mikkel S. Eriksen – engineer, instrumentation
- Nicolas Essig – assistant engineer
- Josh Freese – drums
- Brian "Big Bass" Gardner – mastering
- Chris Gehringer – mastering
- Serban Ghenea – mixing
- Clint Gibbs – assistant, engineer
- Noah Goldstein – vocal engineer
- Jake Gorski – assistant
- Aniela Gottwald – assistant, assistant engineer
- Tatiana Gottwald – assistant, assistant engineer
- Mark Gray – assistant, assistant engineer
- Mike Green – programming
- John Hanes – engineer, mixing
- Kuk Harrell – vocal producer
- Travis Harrington – assistant engineer
- Chandler Harrod – assistant
- Tor Erik Hermansen – instrumentation
- Ngoc Hoàng – coordination
- Sam Holland – engineer
- Josh Houghkirk – assistant engineer
- James Hunt – assistant
- Liz Isik – A&R
- Jaycen Joshua – mixing
- Greg Koller – engineer, mixing
- Damien Lewis – engineer
- Ed Lidow – assistant
- Giancarlo Lino – mixing assistant
- Charles Malone – assistant, assistant engineer, guitar
- Adam Marcello – celeste, percussion
- Max Martin – drums, executive producer, keyboards, producer, programming
- Julio Miranda – guitar
- Katie Mitzell – production coordination
- Monte Neuble – keyboards
- Luis Navarro – assistant, assistant engineer
- Nick Chahwala – bass engineer, guitar engineer, sounds
- Chris "Tek" O'Ryan – engineer, guitar engineer
- Carlos Oyanedel – engineer
- Brent Paschke – guitar
- L. Leon Pendarvis – arranger, conductor
- Katy Perry – guitar, primary artist, vocals
- Lenny Pickett – Saxophone
- Jo Ratcliffe – art direction
- Irene Richter – production coordination
- Justin Roberts – assistant, assistant engineer
- Tim Roberts – assistant, mixing assistant
- Phil Seaford – assistant
- Bob Semanovich – marketing
- Jason Sherwood – engineer
- Vanessa Silberman – production coordination
- Daniel Silvestri – bass, guitar
- Snoop Dogg – featured artist, vocals
- Stargate – producer
- Rob Stevenson – A&R
- C. "Tricky" Stewart – drum programming, keyboards, producer, sequencing
- Patricia Sullivan – mastering
- Tommie Sunshine – remix arrangement, remix producer
- Phil Tan – mixing
- Gavin Taylor – art direction, design
- Brian "B-Luv" Thomas – drum programming, engineer, guitar engineer
- Michael Thompson – bass, guitar
- Pat Thrall – drum programming, engineer, guitar (rhythm), vocal effect, vocoder
- Lewis Tozour – engineer
- Randy Urbanski – assistant, assistant engineer
- Julian Vasquez – vocal engineer
- Sandy Vee – instrumentation, mixing, producer
- Mark Verbos – engineer
- Stephen Villa – assistant
- Miles Walker – engineer
- Fabien Waltmann – programming, synthesizer
- Greg Wells – drums, piano, producer, programming, synthesizer
- Kanye West – featured artist, vocals (courtesy of Def Jam Recordings)
- Emily Wright – engineer
- Andrew Wuepper – engineer, guitar engineer

== Charts ==
=== Weekly charts ===
Chart (2012)	Peak position
Australian Albums (ARIA)	5
Belgian Albums (Ultratop Flanders)	14
Belgian Albums (Ultratop Wallonia)	39
Dutch Albums (Album Top 100)	44
Finnish Albums (Suomen virallinen lista)	18
French Albums (SNEP)	14
Japanese Albums (Oricon)	46
New Zealand Albums (RMNZ)	2
Swedish Albums (Sverigetopplistan)	24
UK Albums (Official Charts)	6
US Billboard 200	7

=== Year-end charts ===
Chart (2012)	Position
Australian Albums (ARIA)	27
French Albums (SNEP)	96
New Zealand Albums (RMNZ)	22
Worldwide Albums (IFPI)	50
Chart (2013)	Position
Australian Albums (ARIA)	89
Chart (2014)	Position
Australian Albums (ARIA)	95
Chart (2020)	Position
Australian Albums (ARIA)	74
Chart (2021)	Position
Australian Albums (ARIA)	53
Chart (2022)	Position
Australian Albums (ARIA)	36
Swedish Albums (Sverigetopplistan)	89
Chart (2023)	Position
Australian Albums (ARIA)	38
Swedish Albums (Sverigetopplistan)	58
Chart (2024)	Position
Australian Albums (ARIA)	27
Swedish Albums (Sverigetopplistan)	42
Chart (2025)	Position
Australian Albums (ARIA)	32
Swedish Albums (Sverigetopplistan)	37

== Certifications and sales ==
Certifications and sales for Teenage Dream: The Complete Confection
Region	Certification	Certified units/sales
Australia (ARIA) Combined with Teenage Dream	7× Platinum	490,000^{‡}
Denmark (IFPI Danmark)	2× Platinum	40,000^{‡}
New Zealand (RMNZ)	4× Platinum	60,000^{‡}
Sweden (GLF) Combined with Teenage Dream	Platinum	40,000^{‡}
Switzerland (IFPI Switzerland)	Platinum	30,000^{‡}
Summaries
Worldwide	—	1,000,000
^{‡} Sales+streaming figures based on certification alone.

== Release history ==
Release dates and formats for Teenage Dream: The Complete Confection
Region	Date	Format	Label	Ref.
Germany	March 23, 2012	CD; digital download	Capitol	
Canada	March 26, 2012	CD; digital download	Capitol	
France	March 26, 2012	CD; digital download	Capitol	
United Kingdom	March 26, 2012	CD; digital download	Capitol	
United States	March 26, 2012	CD; digital download	Capitol	
Hong Kong	March 27, 2012	CD; digital download	EMI	
Taiwan	March 30, 2012	CD; digital download	Gold Typhoon	
Colombia	April 2, 2012	CD; digital download	EMI	
United States	September 9, 2020	LP (Urban Outfitters exclusive)	Capitol	
