= Teenage Dream =

Studio album by Katy Perry
- Released: August 24, 2010
- Recorded: October 2009 – April 2010
- Studios: Conway (Hollywood); Henson (Hollywood); Playback (Santa Barbara); Roc the Mic (New York City); Rocket Carousel (Los Angeles); Silent Sound (Atlanta); Studio at the Palms (Las Vegas); Boom Boom Room (Burbank); Triangle Sound (Atlanta)
- Genre: Pop
- Length: 46:44
- Label: Capitol
- Producers: Max Martin; Dr. Luke; Benny Blanco; C. "Tricky" Stewart; Stargate; Greg Wells; Sandy Vee; Ammo

Katy Perry chronology
| MTV Unplugged (2009) | Teenage Dream (2010) | Teenage Dream: The Complete Confection (2012) |

Singles from Teenage Dream
- 1. "California Gurls" Released: May 7, 2010; 2. "Teenage Dream" Released: July 23, 2010; 3. "Firework" Released: October 26, 2010; 4. "E.T." Released: February 16, 2011; 5. "Last Friday Night (T.G.I.F.)" Released: June 6, 2011; 6. "The One That Got Away" Released: September 30, 2011

Teenage Dream is the third studio album by the American singer-songwriter Katy Perry. It was released on August 24, 2010, through Capitol Records and follows her second album One of the Boys (2008). Primarily a pop record, Teenage Dream also contains elements of disco, electronic, rock, funk, house, hi-NRG, and hip hop, that revolve around young love, partying, self-empowerment, and personal growth. Perry co-wrote the album, and worked with a number of producers such as Max Martin, Dr. Luke, Benny Blanco, Stargate, and Greg Wells.

With "California Gurls" (featuring Snoop Dogg), "Teenage Dream", "Firework", "E.T.", and "Last Friday Night (T.G.I.F.)", Teenage Dream is the second album in history to have five singles (after Michael Jackson's 1987 album Bad) top the US Billboard Hot 100, and the first by a woman to do so. Its sixth single, "The One That Got Away", peaked at number three on that chart, becoming the third after Janet Jackson's Rhythm Nation 1814 and George Michael's Faith to have six top-five songs on the Hot 100. Teenage Dream topped the album charts in Australia, Austria, Canada, Ireland, New Zealand, Scotland, the United Kingdom, and the United States. It has sold more than 12 million copies worldwide and received Diamond certifications in Canada and the US, while being certified multi-Platinum in Australia, Denmark, France, Germany, India, Ireland, Italy, New Zealand, Norway, and the UK.

Upon its release, Teenage Dream received mixed reviews from music critics, who complimented its production, themes, and Perry's vocal ability while criticism was largely focused on the lack of focus and image, and vulnerability on the album. However, retrospective reviews have praised the album, ranking it on multiple decade-end best albums lists. Billboard named Teenage Dream "one of the defining LPs from a new golden age in mega-pop" and The A.V. Club called the album "pop perfection". Rolling Stone and Paste ranked it among "The 250 Greatest Albums of the 21st Century So Far" in 2025 at number 134 and 179, respectively. The album and its singles earned Perry seven Grammy Award nominations including Album of the Year, Best Pop Vocal Album, and Record of the Year. It also won International Album of the Year at the Juno Awards of 2011.

To promote the album, Perry embarked on the California Dreams Tour from 2011 to 2012, which was also an international success and featured guest appearances from Rebecca Black and opening acts such as Ellie Goulding, Janelle Monáe, Robyn, and Marina and the Diamonds, alongside others. The Teenage Dream era officially concluded with the documentary film Katy Perry: Part of Me, which featured numerous guest appearances from popular musicians and footage from the California Dreams Tour.

== Background and development ==
"We worked in Santa Barbara, we worked in Los Angeles. I was telling everybody I had a lot of jewels, but I didn't have the crown, and then I finally got the crown so all the jewels made sense. And now I have this thing, this crown that I'm ready to present."

— Perry on Teenage Dream

Following the success of her breakthrough album One of the Boys (2008), Perry did not want her next record to alienate her fanbase, opting to "definitely keep it pop" and not shift her style, believing it would show "whether I'm meant to do this, or I got lucky". In a 2009 interview with Rolling Stone, she revealed that the album would focus on the "whirlwind" last year of her life, dealing with her newfound fame, friendships, relationships, further stating that "I'm not just gonna talk about the beat and just dancing, I like to get into the meaning". At that point, the singer described the new lyrics as "very honest, if not more honest than the last ones. But they are a little bit more mature... I know how to handle boys now". Perry also wanted the album to have more tempo than One of the Boys to make her live shows more dynamic. She explained: "I really love going to shows where I'm sandwiched between people, and you don't know if the sweat on you is yours or the person's next to you. I love that feeling, and when I was on tour I would see that I was missing that a bit".

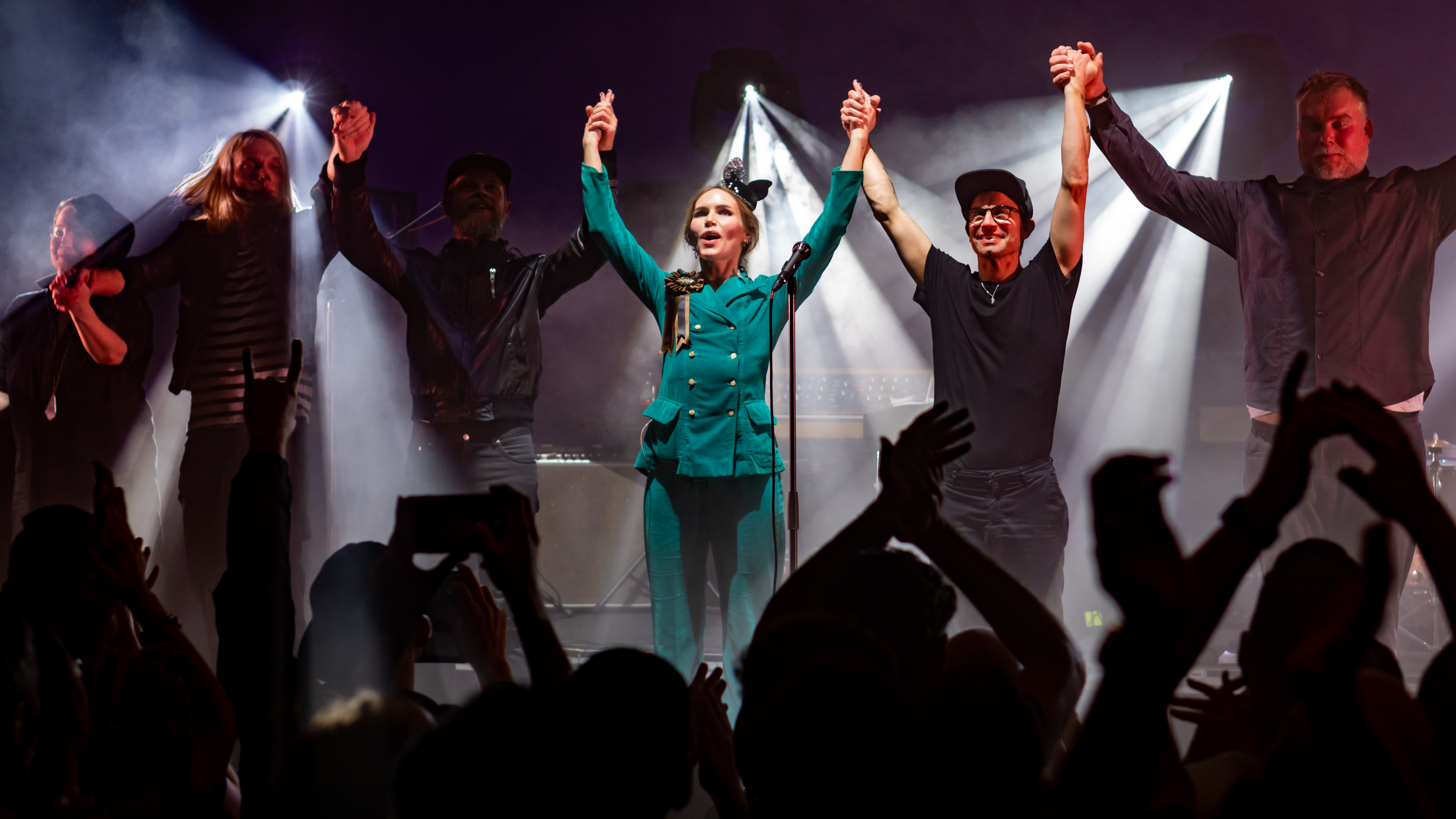
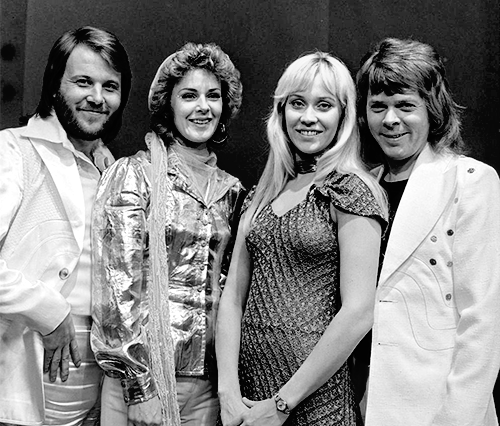
The Cardigans and ABBA were cited as major influences on the creation of Teenage Dream.

Recording sessions for Teenage Dream began in 2009 and took place at a multitude of recording studios in the United States. Work on the album involved collaborating with numerous artists and producers including Dr. Luke, Greg Wells, Guy Sigsworth, Max Martin, Ryan Tedder, Rivers Cuomo, Kuk Harrell, Greg Kurstin, Benny Blanco, Darkchild, Cathy Dennis, Esther Dean, and Tricky Stewart, who told Rap-Up in December 2009 that the sound of the album would be pop and rock, like One of the Boys, though calling it a "different gear" for himself. Perry also desired to collaborate with Calvin Harris on the record, "but he got really famous so it didn't happen". According to Luke, Perry gave him a mixtape of songs which inspired her to demonstrate how she wanted the next record to sound. The singer also claimed that working with Martin and Luke was "a wonderful collaborative effort". As for the visual component, the singer likens it to "going from Shirley Temple, Betty Boop to more of a Betty Paige [sic], pop art-sarcastic-fun-Lichtenstein picture: still bright, but the colors are more saturated, and it's more metallic fuchsia or purple than bubblegum pink."

== Music and lyrics ==
Perry stated about the album "You're getting the sugary sweet but you're also getting the 'Oh my goodness, she had to sit down for a minute and let things off her chest'". The music of Teenage Dream is derived from a wide variety of pop genres, while heavily incorporating different musical styles not heard on her previous releases; disco and electronic are examples. Musically, Teenage Dream is considered to be a departure from One of the Boys (2008), which was pop rock and soft rock driven. The album features a very wide range of rock subgenres, which include disco rock, glam metal, indie rock, pop rock, hard rock, electronic rock, and goth rock.

=== Songs ===
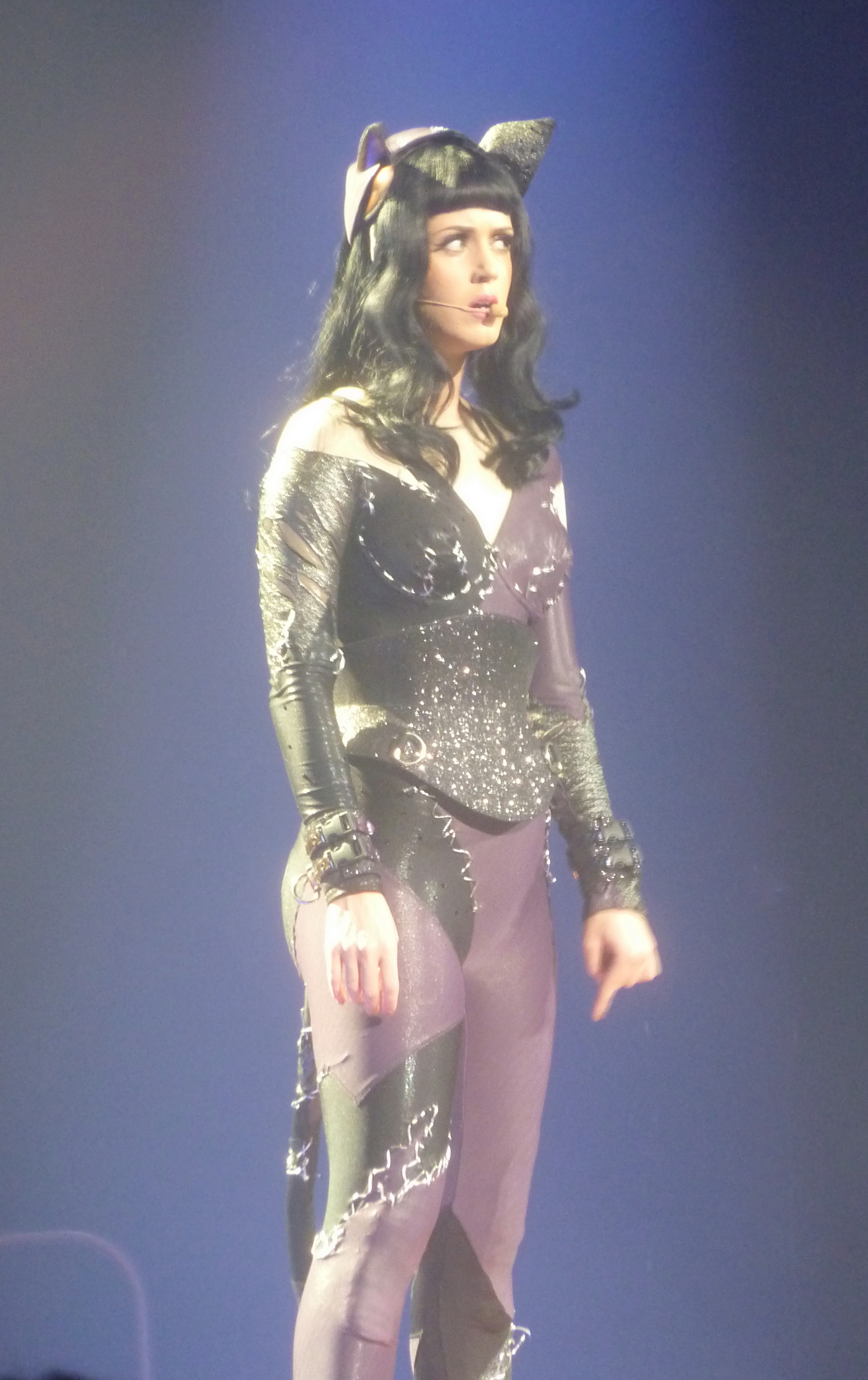
Perry performing "Circle the Drain" in Paris

The album opens with the title track "Teenage Dream", which is written as a throwback record to Perry's teenage years. It is a power pop and electropop song which features a "distinct retro sound", and contains influences of disco, pop rock, and industrial music. The song has been compared to several disco artists, including Madonna and the Cardigans. The second song is "Last Friday Night (T.G.I.F.)", the song recalls a true experience that Perry had while partying in Santa Barbara which included streaking in a park, dancing on tables, and partying at a club. Musically, the song is styled in the genres of disco, indie rock, and Hi-NRG, while also taking influence from dance-pop. Its third track "California Gurls" continues the "retro sound" carried from "Teenage Dream", and is written as an answer song to "Empire State of Mind" by Jay-Z and Alicia Keys, and pays tribute to the beach lifestyle of California. The song uses the genres of disco, funk-pop, and electropop, while bearing influence of new wave music within its composition.

Teenage Dream's fourth track is the self-empowerment song "Firework". Written in a disco-rock style which runs over the backing track, it consists of a mix of violins and house music. The song has generated comparisons to artists such as Coldplay and Leona Lewis. According to Perry, "Firework" was inspired by Jack Kerouac's novel On the Road, and she has said on many occasions that it is her favorite song from the album. "Peacock" is a dance-pop song, with an up-tempo house music beat. Lyrically, the track contains a double entendre with suggestive wording. New York magazine writer Willa Paskin observed that Perry did the obvious with the song's hook ("she used a common word for penis and made it mean penis!"). Rob Sheffield from Rolling Stone thought of "Peacock" as a sequel to Gwen Stefani's 2005 single "Hollaback Girl" by noticing the two songs shared a drum hook. The album follows with "Circle the Drain", a disco-rock song where, lyrically, Perry is telling off a self-destructive drug-addicted ex-boyfriend. Its candid lyrics also discuss the strains his addiction put on both of them. In the track's chorus, she sings about how she wants to be his lover, not someone who has to take care of him, such as a maternal figure. She also sings about how he had ultimately lost large opportunities. The song is styled in the genres of disco-rock, and gothic rock tones. Following this track is "The One That Got Away", which is a pop ballad. Perry stated that she wrote the song "about when you promise someone forever, but you end up not being able to follow through. It's a bittersweet story. Hopefully, the listener learns from hearing it and never has to say they had "the one" get away."

The eighth song, "E.T." is a song about "falling in love with a foreigner". A remix of the song features Kanye West. Musically, the track is an electronic and hip hop ballad influenced by drum and bass, rave, and techno. The eleventh track, "Hummingbird Heartbeat", was inspired by Perry's boyfriend at the time, Russell Brand. Musically, it is a 1980s-styled hard rock song that contains a mixture of elements from rock and electronica. Lyrically, the song compares the feeling of being in love to the speed of a hummingbird's heartbeat. The last track is "Not Like the Movies" a power ballad about a love relationship where a woman does not feel in love and still waits for the man of her dreams, or "charming prince", as a Terra reviewer put it. Its melody was compared to Britney Spears' "Everytime" (2003) and Evanescence's "My Immortal" (2003).

== Release and artwork ==
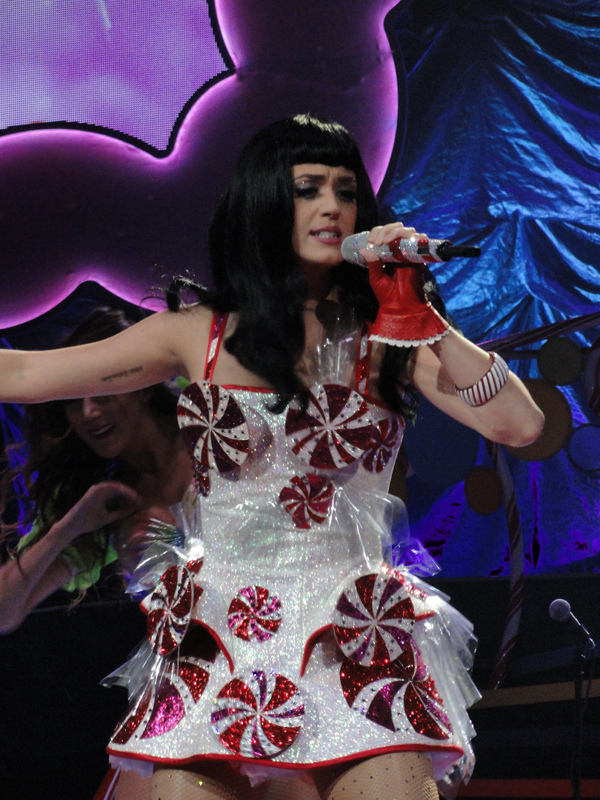
Perry performing "Teenage Dream" on the 2011–2012 California Dreams Tour, which inspired the album's title

On June 14, 2010, a beach-themed listening party took place in New York, where a number of tracks from the album were played. Before the album's release, "Not Like the Movies", "Circle the Drain", and "E.T." were made available exclusively on iTunes Store as a countdown to Teenage Dream. Capitol Records first released Teenage Dream in the United States and Canada on August 24, 2010, as a standard and deluxe edition, which contained remixes of "California Gurls" and "Teenage Dream". A two-CD edition titled Dream On was later released, consisting of a CD featuring the 12 original tracks, plus another one with two tracks on which Perry had previously appeared as a featured artist — 3OH!3's "Starstrukk" and Timbaland's "If We Ever Meet Again", and remixes of "California Gurls" and "Teenage Dream". The album was distributed by EMI Music Japan on August 25 in Japan, and released three days later in the United Kingdom. Teenage Dream was eventually released worldwide on August 30, 2010, by EMI. It was re-released on October 20, 2023, as a two-edition vinyl.

The album's title was revealed as Teenage Dream in May 2010, with Perry explaining it was named after a song on the album she wrote on her hometown in Santa Barbara, which "kind of exudes this euphoric feeling like everyone remembers what their teenage dreams were", Perry explained. The title attracted controversy as it had a similar title to duo Beach House's Teen Dream, released earlier that year. A member of the duo addressed the issue on Twitter, writing they "can't believe this, and not in a good way" when linking to the Teenage Dream Wikipedia article. Their fans also reacted by posting comments on Perry's Wikipedia page, including one that read: "Mrs. Perry's album title may or may not be ripping off the brilliant indie duo Beach House and their critically acclaimed record Teen Dream. It will be a challenge for her to achieve the same aural masterpiece".

The album cover, which shows Perry lying naked on clouds of pink cotton candy, was painted on a 6x6 canvas by Will Cotton and revealed on July 21, 2010. She first approached Cotton in early 2010, asking him if paintings from his "Cotton Candy Clouds" series, which depicted pinup girls laying nude in a pink sky, were available for purchase. After viewing photographs from her One of the Boys album, he instead suggested she pose for a painting, as he thought Perry had the same pin-up burlesque style he looked for in a model. Cotton baptized the artwork as Cotton Candy Katy, and later art directed the music video for "California Gurls". She explained the reason on choosing a painting for the cover: "Maybe CDs will be extinct next time I put out the album...so I wanted to go out with a bang for people to remember this. I think our collaboration will make it memorable". Perry decided not to include her name or the album's title on the cover and stated, "Hopefully they know it's me by the actual picture". A limited number of copies carried a cotton candy scent, described by MTV News' Kyle Anderson as "not unlike that artificial bubblegum smell you sometimes get".

== Promotion ==
=== Live performances ===
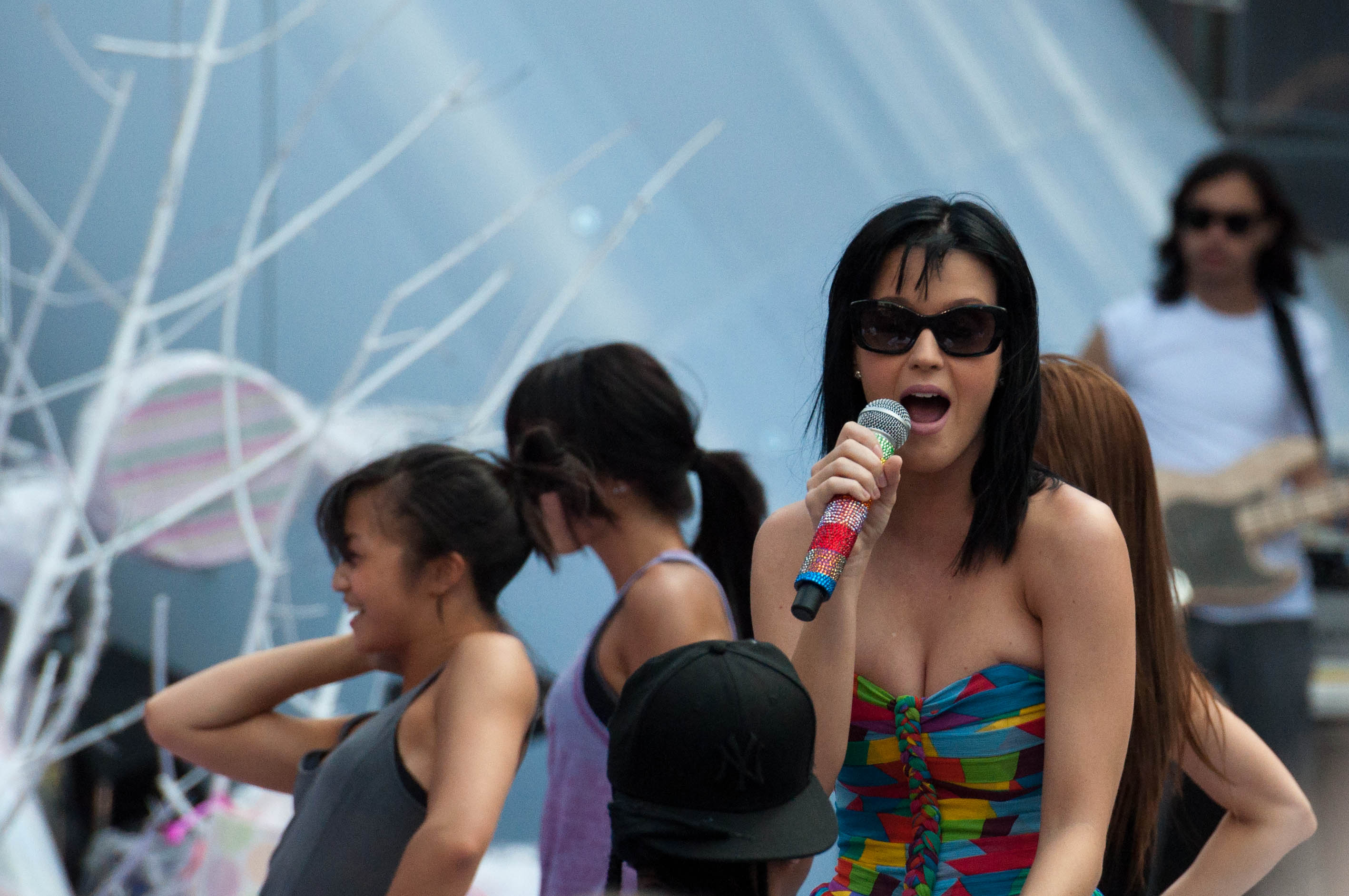
Perry rehearsing "California Gurls" for her performance at the 2010 MuchMusic Video Awards

Promotion for the album began with a live performance of "California Gurls" on May 20, 2010, at the CW networks' annual "upfronts" presentation in New York. Perry later performed the track at the 2010 MTV Movie Awards alongside Dogg; MTV News described the performance as "postcard come to life", with the singer taking style notes from "1950s 'greetings from' state postcards, I-t-t-t-totally-love-the-'80s fluorescents, a little 1960s sci-fi", as well as "a dash of 1970s Wonder Woman flair". Before the performance, MTV had tweeted that the singer would appear naked on stage, which made Perry upset. She also promoted the song that same month on Le Grand Journal. The Candyland theme from the "California Gurls" video was used in the performance at the 2010 MuchMusic Video Awards; she had previously stated that her performance would be different from the music video, as it would not feature "cupcake boobies".

In July, Perry performed at the MTV World Stage Live in Malaysia with a set that included lifesize cupcakes, backing singers dressed like candy canes and Perry wearing a white glitter unitard and tutu; during her set, the singer premiered "Peacock". The next month, she opened the 2010 Teen Choice Awards with a rendition of "Teenage Dream" with cheerleaders, jocks, and dancers surrounding her on stage. During a promotional visit to Australia, Perry performed a small concert for Sunrise. On the album's release day in the United States, she appeared on the Late Show with David Letterman and gave a small concert and performed several tracks from the album along with older songs. The rendition was broadcast live across the web. Two days later, the singer appeared at Rockefeller Plaza for Today and sang "California Gurls" and "Teenage Dream". She then made a return to Le Grand Journal to perform the title track.

In September, Perry made a rendition of "California Gurls" on X Factor Italia, and appeared on Alan Carr: Chatty Man in the United Kingdom. She was then the musical guest on Saturday Night Live. The next month, the singer went to Germany to perform at Wetten, dass..?, and then performed "Firework" on the seventh season of the British version of The X Factor. In November, at the 2010 MTV Europe Music Awards, Perry performed the same track. Days later, the singer made a special concert at New York's Roseland Ballroom to launch the Windows Phone 7, where she performed several songs from Teenage Dream. In London, Perry performed a small set of songs for the 2010 BBC Radio 1's Teen Awards. She finished November by performing at the Victoria's Secret Fashion Show 2010, donning two different outfits for the event. At the 53rd Annual Grammy Awards which took place in February 2011, Perry performed "Not Like the Movies" and "Teenage Dream".

=== Tour ===
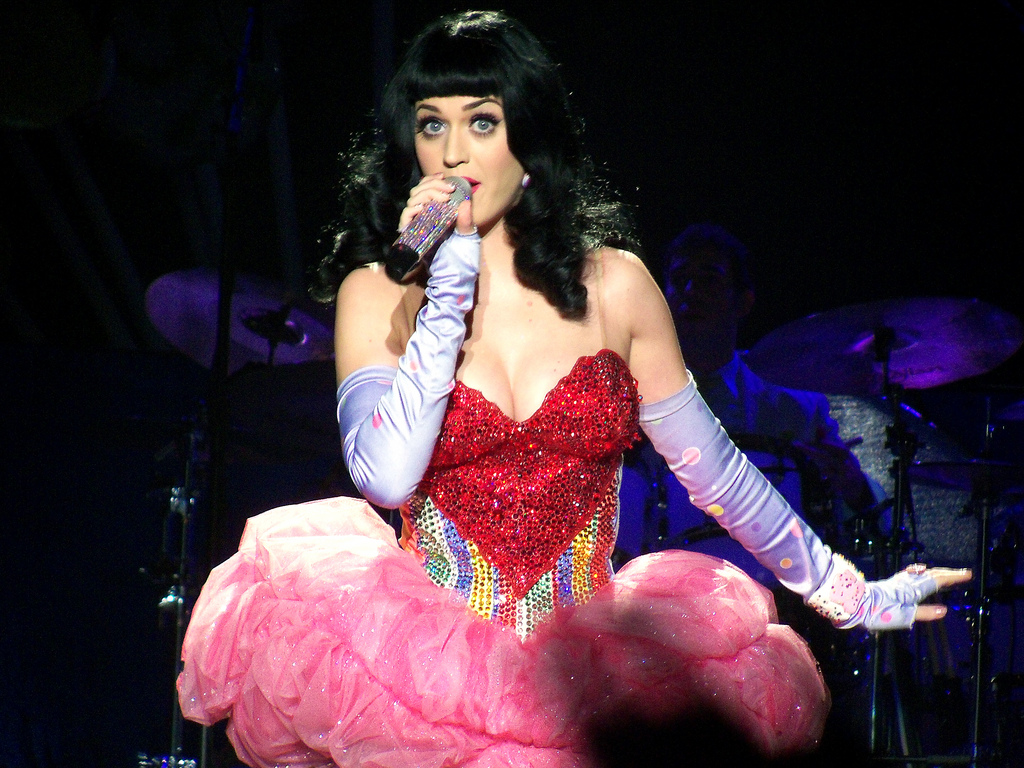
Perry performing "Hummingbird Heartbeat" on the 2011–2012 California Dreams Tour

The California Dreams Tour was officially announced in October 2010. Before the announcement, Perry had expressed she wanted her next concert tour to be very focused on visuals, and wanted it to be "10 times better" than her previous tour. She also stated that it would "engage all of your senses: sight, sound, smell, taste, touch". Baz Halpin was signed up as the tour director, and designed the show to be a "jukebox musical". It was originally designed as an essentially theater-based tour. However, as Perry's popularity grew, the tour was scaled up and revamped to accommodate larger venues. Robyn, Yelle, and Marina and the Diamonds served as opening acts for the concerts, which Perry described as "super girl power". The tour was a commercial success, and was ranked 16th in Pollstar's "2011 Top 25 Worldwide Tours", earning over $59.5 million. At the conclusion of 2011, it ranked 13th on Billboard's annual "Top 25 Tours", earning nearly $50 million with 98 shows. It won an award for Favorite Tour Headliner at the 38th People's Choice Awards. It was announced that the tour's stop at the Staples Center in Los Angeles on November 23, 2011, would be filmed for a future DVD release, but it was never released.

== Singles ==
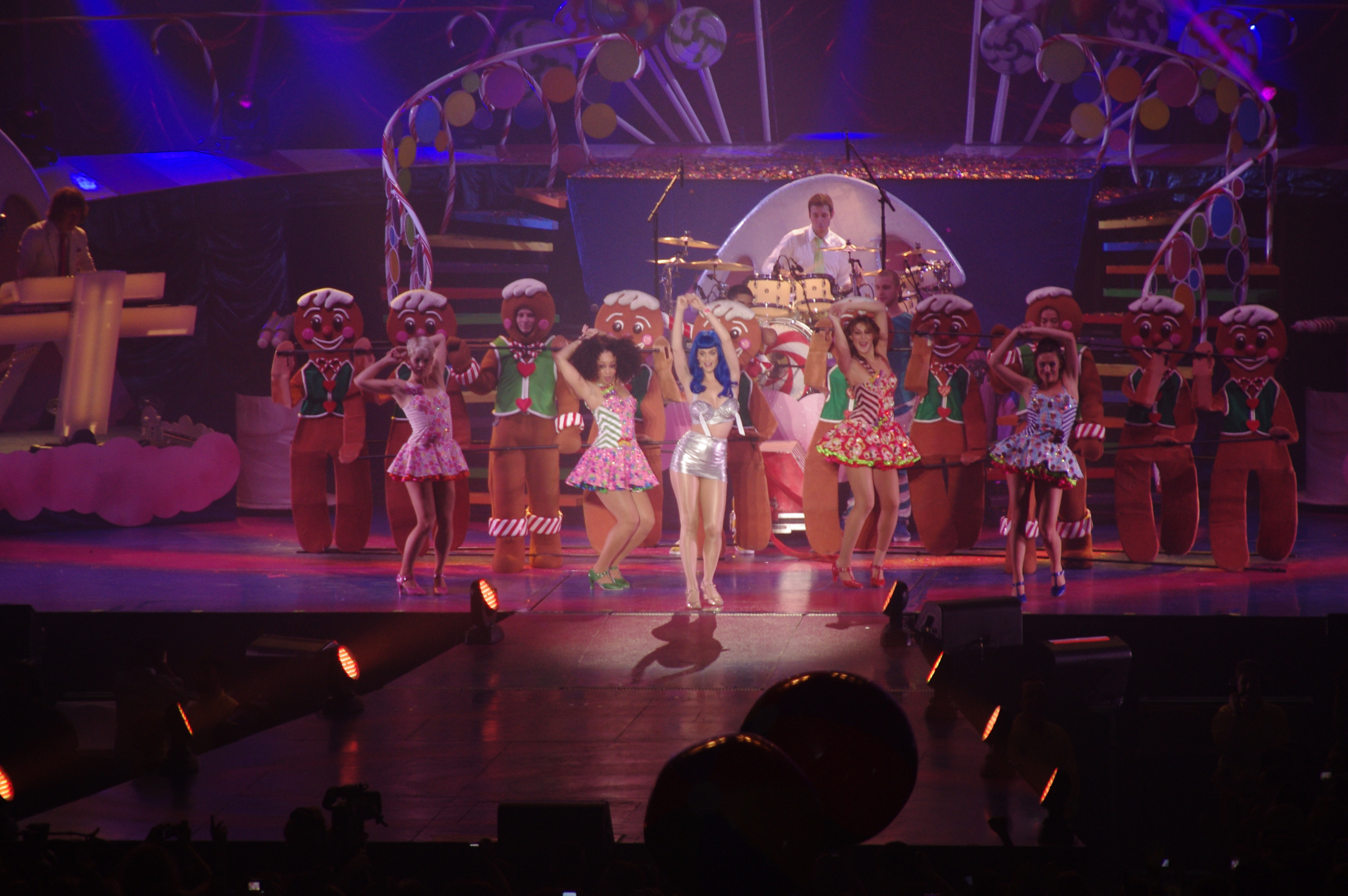
Perry performing "California Gurls" in Nottingham, England

"California Gurls" was the lead single from Teenage Dream, which features rapper Snoop Dogg. The single made its radio debut on May 7, 2010, and was digitally released four days later. The song peaked at number one on the US Billboard Hot 100.

"Teenage Dream" was released as the second single from the album. The song went to radio stations in the US on July 22, 2010. The song received positive reviews from music critics, with Jocelyn Vena of MTV News said it "picks up right where 'California Gurls' leaves off", describing it as having "a strong beat". The song had also had chart success as similar to the first single, peaking at number one on the US Billboard Hot 100 for two consecutive weeks, and also peaked at number one in Ireland, New Zealand, Scotland, Slovakia and other sub-charts in the US.

"Firework" was released as the third offering from the album. The song was released on October 18, 2010, through radio airplay, followed by a digital release on November 2, 2010, in the UK. The music video for "Firework" is part of a cross-promotional deal with European telecommunications group Deutsche Telekom. Deutsche Telekom hosted a series of activities and competitions from which fans around Europe were recruited to be in the video. The song had commercial success as well, peaking at number one in the US and spent four non-consecutive weeks. The song also topped the charts in Brazil, Canada, New Zealand and subcharts in the US.

"E.T." was released on February 11, 2011. For its single release, the song was remixed to feature new verses from Kanye West. The music video for the song, directed by Floria Sigismondi, was filmed in February 2011 and features both Perry and West. The video was released on March 31, 2011. The song topped the charts in the US for five non-consecutive weeks, and also peaked at the top position in Canada, Germany, Poland and New Zealand.

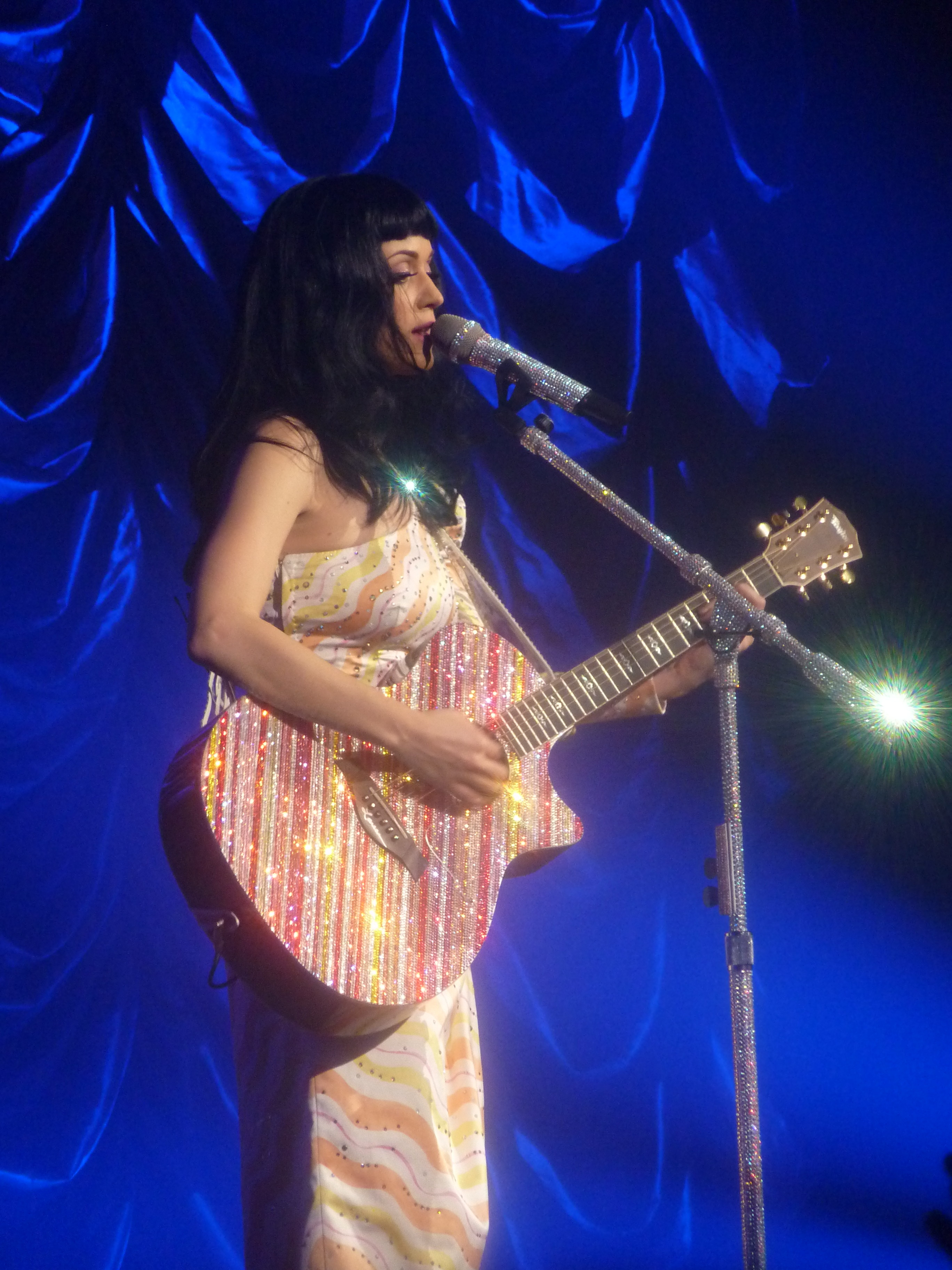
Perry performing "The One That Got Away"

"Last Friday Night (T.G.I.F.)" was released on June 6, 2011, on contemporary hit and rhythmic contemporary radios as the fifth single from the album. The single had sold three million digital copies by mid-February 2012, becoming Perry's seventh single to do so. The song received generally mixed reviews from music critics. The song also received commercial success, peaking at number one in Canada, the Czech Republic, Slovakia and the US, topping the Billboard Hot 100 chart for two consecutive weeks. The music video was released worldwide on June 14, 2011. It guest stars Darren Criss, Rebecca Black, Kevin McHale, Kenny G, Hanson, Corey Feldman and Debbie Gibson. A remixed version of "Last Friday Night" was released on August 8, 2011, featuring American rapper Missy Elliott.

"The One That Got Away" was released as the sixth single from Teenage Dream. The song was released on October 11, 2011, on US Mainstream radio. The song received mostly positive reviews from most music critics, who complimented Perry's serious tone. A teaser of the music video was also released in early November, and the full music video premiered on November 11, 2011, on The Ellen DeGeneres Show. On November 24, the single entered the top five of the Billboard Hot 100, making Teenage Dream one of only seven albums in US history to have six or more top 10 singles. On December 14, it became one in two albums to yield six top four songs, when it soared to number four, it later peaked at number three.

=== Promotional singles ===
"Not Like the Movies" and "Circle the Drain" were released as promotional singles as album previews in the United States.. They debuted at numbers 53 and 58 on the Hot 100, respectively. The solo, album version of "E.T." was also released as a promotional single on the same day of the album release, before later being given an official single release. A remix of "Peacock" was released on March 26, 2012, on iTunes as the fourth and final promotional single of the album. It reached number 64 in Canada, number 52 in the Czech Republic, and number one on the US Dance Club Songs chart. It has also sold over 500,000 copies in the US and certified Gold on July 9, 2012. A dance remix of it was released on March 26, 2012.

== Critical reception ==
Professional ratings
Aggregate scores
| Source | Rating |
|---|---|
| AnyDecentMusic? | 5.4/10 |
| Metacritic | 52/100 |
Review scores
| Source | Rating |
| AllMusic | 5/5 stars |
| Billboard | 4/5 stars |
| Chicago Tribune | 1/4 stars |
| Entertainment Weekly | B− |
| Los Angeles Times | 3/4 stars |
| Pitchfork | 6.8/10 |
| Rolling Stone | 3/5 stars |
| Slant Magazine | 1.5/5 stars |
| Spin | 6/10 |
| USA Today | 3/4 stars |

Teenage Dream received mixed reviews upon release from music critics. Giving the album 5 out of 5 stars, Stephen Thomas Erlewine of AllMusic wrote that "There's no question Perry is smart enough to know every rule in pop but she's not inspired enough to ignore them, almost seeming nervous to break away from the de rigueur lite club beats that easily transition from day to night or the chilly, stainless-steel ballads designed to lose none of their luster on repeat plays." He felt that it contained "accents to her old One of the Boys palette" and distinguished itself through vulgar lyrics. Mikael Wood of Spin gave a mixed review, noting that the album "won't disappoint parents looking for reasons to worry about their kids". Rob Sheffield from Rolling Stone described the album as "heavy on Eighties beats, light on melody, taking a long dip into the Daft Punk filter-disco house sound." In a negative review, Greg Kot of the Chicago Tribune rated the album one star out of four. He criticized the production, calling it "Frankenstein-like", as well as calling Perry's vocals "robotic" and lacking "any elegance or nuance". Matthew Cole of Slant Magazine called it "over-produced bad-girl debauchery", claiming that Perry has "found a way to lower the bar".

Ann Powers from the Los Angeles Times gave it three stars, saying, "On 'Teenage Dream,' the songs alternate between weekend-bender celebrations of hedonism and self-help-style affirmations encouraging listeners to get an emotional makeover. Either way, acquisition is the goal: of a great love, a happy hangover, a perfect pair of Daisy Dukes". Leah Greenblatt, writing for Entertainment Weekly, stated, "beneath the fruity outfits and fart jokes, Perry is clearly serious about the business of hit songcraft; that doesn't make Dream nearly cohesive as an album, but it does provide, intermittently, exactly the kind of high-fructose rush she's aiming for." On the album's 10th anniversary, Patrick Gomez of The A.V. Club praised it as "pop perfection", writing that "the magic of the album is that it remains cohesive" and "the heightened emotions of teen love, lust, and self-discovery remain a constant throughout". Writing for The Republican, Kevin O'Hare gave the album 3.5 stars out of five, praising its titular track and "California Gurls" for being "infectious" and "joyous [blasts] of nostalgia." He had a similar opinion for "Who Am I Living For?" for Katy Perry's "powerhouse singing" and "Not Like the Movies", calling the lattermost a "delicately beautiful piano ballad". O'Hare was far less favorable towards "The One That Got Away", criticizing the track as "fairly thin."

== Accolades ==
=== Awards and nominations ===
Name of award, year listed, category, and result
| Award | Year | Category | Result | Ref. |
|---|---|---|---|---|
| American Music Awards | 2010 | Favorite Pop/Rock Album | Nominated | |
| Billboard Readers' Polls | 2010 | Favorite Album of the Year | Won | |
| Chart Attack | 2010 | Best International Album | Won | |
| IRMA Number One Awards | 2010 | Number-One Album | Won | |
| The Official Specialist Number One Awards | 2010 | Number One Album Downloads | Won | |
| The Official Specialist Number One Awards | 2010 | Number One Physical Albums | Won | |
| Telehit Awards | 2010 | Best International Album | Nominated | |
| Popjustice Readers' Poll Awards | 2010 | Best Album | 6th | |
| Virgin Media Music Awards | 2010 | Best Album | Nominated | |
| Z Awards | 2010 | Favorite Pop/Rock Album | Won | |
| Žebřík Music Awards | 2010 | International – Female Album of the Year | 3rd | |
| Billboard Music Awards | 2011 | Pop Album of the Year | Nominated | |
| Brit Awards | 2011 | International Album of the Year | Nominated | |
| Grammy Awards | 2011 | Album of the Year | Nominated | |
| Grammy Awards | 2011 | Best Pop Vocal Album | Nominated | |
| Juno Awards | 2011 | International Album of the Year | Won | |
| Telehit Awards | 2011 | Best International Album | Won | |
| Premios Oye! | 2012 | English Album | Nominated | |
| ARIA Number One Chart Awards | 2014 | Number-One Album | Won | |
| RIAA Diamond Awards | 2024 | Diamond Album | Won | |

=== Listicles ===
Name of publication, year listed, name of listicle, and result
| Publication | Year | Listicle | Result | Ref. |
|---|---|---|---|---|
| Access Hollywood | 2010 | Best Albums of the Year: Staff Picks | Placed | |
| The Guardian | 2010 | Best Albums of the Year | Placed | |
| MTV News | 2010 | Best Albums of the Year | 5th | |
| Oregon Public Broadcasting | 2010 | Best Albums of the Year: Staff Picks | Placed | |
| Popjustice | 2010 | Best Albums of the Year | 21st | |
| Complex | 2013 | Best Pop Album covers of the Past Five Years | 42nd | |
| VH1 | 2015 | Most Important Pop Albums of the Last 10 Years | 1st | |
| The Fader | 2017 | Great Albums by Women | 71st | |
| Associated Press | 2019 | Best Albums of the 2010s | 9th | |
| Billboard | 2019 | Best Albums of the 2010s: Staff Picks | 14th | |
| Consequence | 2019 | Best Albums of the 2010s | 70th | |
| Paste | 2019 | Best Albums of the 2010s | Best Pop Albums of the 2010s | 16th |
| Rolling Stone India | 2019 | Best Albums of the 2010s | 43rd | |
| Tampa Bay Times | 2019 | Best Albums of the 2010s | 5th | |
| The Recording Academy | 2019 | 2025 | Iconic Album Covers of All Time | Placed |
| Rolling Stone | Greatest Albums of the 21st Century | 2025 | 134th | |
| Paste | Greatest Albums of the 21st Century | 2025 | 179th | |

== Commercial performance ==
=== Worldwide and digital platforms ===
Teenage Dream ranked for three consecutive years on the annual list of top-selling albums worldwide published by the International Federation of the Phonographic Industry (IFPI). Specifically, the album ranked 11th in 2010, 23rd in 2011, and 50th in 2012. As of August 2025, Teenage Dream has sold more than 12 million copies worldwide, becoming Perry's highest-selling album to date. It has also become her most-streamed album on Spotify, while five songs from its tracklist have reached at least a billion streams on the platform. On YouTube, five songs from the album have accumulated over a billion views as of August 2026. Teenage Dream is the eighth most-streamed album by a female artist globally in 2026 according to Billboard France.

=== The Americas ===
After its release, Teenage Dream debuted at number one on the US Billboard 200 chart, with a total of 192,000 copies sold in its first week. The album has spent a total of 469 non-consecutive weeks on the chart as of May 2026, becoming Perry's longest-charting album to date and one of the longest-charting albums by any female artist ever. Teenage Dream has been certified Diamond by the Recording Industry Association of America (RIAA) for accumulating a total of 10 million album-equivalent units. The album has become one of the few LPs from the 2010s decade to achieve Diamond certification from the RIAA and the album era with the highest accumulated certifications ever for any artist. According to Nielsen Music, the album has sold 3.1 million copies in the United States as of August 2020. In Canada, Teenage Dream also debuted at number one on the Billboard Canadian Albums Chart, selling a total of 26,000 copies. The album has spent a total of 287 weeks on the chart and became the eighth best-selling album of the 2010s after selling 376,000 copies. In May 2023, it was certified Diamond by Music Canada after shifting 800,000 album sales units. Teenage Dream peaked at number four on the Top Álbuns Brasil for the week ending October 2, 2011, and was the best-selling international release during that week. A year later, it has reportedly sold more than 100,000 copies in Brazil. Elsewhere, the album was certified Platinum in Colombia and Mexico.

=== Asia-Pacific ===
Teenage Dream debuted at number one for a two-week run at the top of the ARIA Albums Chart in Australia. The album was later certified seven-times Platinum by the Australian Recording Industry Association (ARIA), for sales of 490,000 units. It was also the 13th best-selling album of the 2010s in the country. In New Zealand, Teenage Dream debuted at number two on the Top 40 Albums Chart for the week ending September 9, 2010. The album peaked at number one in its fifth week and has spent a total of 137 weeks on the chart. It was later certified 11-times Platinum by Recorded Music NZ. Teenage Dream has become one of the best-performing albums on both Australia and New Zealand album charts since 1988. On the Gaon Digital Chart in South Korea, for the week ending September 11, 2010, every track from Teenage Dream that had not been released earlier debuted on the International Download Chart. All 12 songs from its tracklist made it onto the chart for that week. The album has been certified two-times Platinum in India, and Platinum in the Philippines and Singapore.

=== Europe ===
Teenage Dream debuted at number one on the UK Albums Chart, selling 54,176 copies. Since then, the album has spent a total of 432 non-consecutive weeks on the chart and was certified seven-times Platinum by the British Phonographic Industry. As of July 2026, it has sold 2,113,617 copies in the United Kingdom. Teenage Dream debuted at number 14 on the French Albums Chart and peaked at number three the next week, becoming Perry's second top ten in the chart. The album was certified two-times Platinum by the Syndicat National de l'Édition Phonographique (SNEP) and stayed 89 weeks on the chart with many re-entries, becoming her longest-running album in France. As of 2013, it has sold 266,200 copies in the country. In Germany, Teenage Dream peaked at number five on the GfK Albums Chart and has spent a total of 218 weeks on the chart. The album was certified two-times Platinum by the Bundesverband Musikindustrie (BVMI) and has become Perry's longest-charting and highest certified album in the country. In Switzerland, Teenage Dream peaked at number four and spent a total of 237 weeks on the Swiss Hitparade Albums Chart, making it the singer's longest-charting album in that region as well. The album additionally peaked at number one in the main album charts of Austria, Ireland, and Scotland. It was certified five-times Platinum in Norway, three-times Platinum in Italy, two-times Platinum in Denmark and Ireland, and Platinum in Austria and Sweden.

== Legacy ==
Teenage Dream achieved a multitude of records throughout its run. Perry scored five Billboard Hot 100 number one singles from Teenage Dream, making her the second artist in the chart's 53-year history to amass five number-one singles from one album over its first release after Michael Jackson achieved the feat with his 1987 album Bad. Perry is the first female in history to achieve this milestone. The album is one of only three albums to produce six or more top-five singles on the Billboard Hot 100 chart (along with Janet Jackson's Rhythm Nation 1814 and George Michael's Faith), and the first album to have seven songs top the Dance Club Songs chart, breaking the previous record set by Beyoncé's I Am... Sasha Fierce and Kristine W's The Power of Music, both with six songs. Teenage Dream is also the album with the most number-one singles on the US Pop Airplay chart. Moreover, the album is the fifth album in history with the most weeks by a female artist on the Billboard 200. Perry was able to replicate this success in the United Kingdom, breaking the Official Charts's record for the most Top 10 singles from one studio album by a female solo artist.

Teenage Dream came to have a good time and to hit it really, really big. "Teenage Dream," "Last Friday Night," "California Gurls," "Firework" and "E.T."—five No. 1 songs in a row. Some pop stars spend their whole lives trying to put together a string of hits that amount to a lasting legacy; Katy Perry did it in the first 15 minutes. This album is a crowning achievement, not just of her career but of its style: EDM and disco and pop, bold and belting, entirely processed yet instantly recognizable, robust yet chintzy.

— Anna Gaca of Pitchfork

Eight songs from Teenage Dream have topped Billboard's Adult Top 40 chart as well as the Mainstream Top 40 chart, both more than any other album in each respective chart's history. Additionally, with seven chart-toppers from "Waking Up in Vegas", Perry broke the record for the longest streak of number ones on the Mainstream Top 40 set by Lady Gaga's first six singles. The singles also allowed Perry to have an unprecedented 69-week long streak in the Hot 100's top-10, as well as a 71-week top-10 streak on the Airplay chart. Perry also has the most number-one singles (four) from one album to top the Canadian Hot 100. Combined, the songs have sold a total of over 35 million copies worldwide aside from the album. Also, the first five singles from the album topped the charts in the United States and attained top-10 positions in more than 20 countries. All five singles also topped the Digital and Airplay charts, making her the first artist ever to have five number-one singles in the Airplay chart. Perry became the only artist to spend over 52 consecutive weeks in the top 10 of the Billboard Hot 100, and later heightened this to 69 weeks, with the first five singles from album, breaking the 15-year long previous record held by Ace of Base of 48 weeks with three singles . On the Mainstream Top 40, the album holds the unique record in the chart's history to have four songs from the same album in the top five of "Most weekly plays"; 1. "Last Friday Night (T.G.I.F.)" (12,468), 2. "E.T." (12,361), 3. "California Gurls" (12,159), and 4. "Firework" (11,857). Additionally, Teenage Dream is the first album to sell over 50 million singles in the United States.

In a retrospective review of the Teenage Dream, Pitchfork called the album "a crowning achievement, not just of her career but of its style: EDM and disco and pop, bold and belting, entirely processed yet instantly recognizable, robust yet chintzy." uDiscover Music wrote in 2020 that the album "holds an outsized influence on pop music landscape and the many artists she helped inspire" and that it along with the "Teenage Dream" song "lives on as a nostalgic spectacle that set the course for the pop icon's aesthetic". In 2015, VH1 called Teenage Dream "the most important pop album of the last 10 years" and added "it surged a blend of silliness into the dance genre that had been dominated by Lady Gaga's Fame Monster edge". In an interview for Apple Music for her album If I Can't Have Love, I Want Power, American singer-songwriter Halsey called Teenage Dream the "perfect pop album", saying: "Anyone who's trying to make a perfect pop album is wasting their time because Katy already did it with Teenage Dream." Lorde praised the title track as one of the "all-time greats," while Maren Morris called "Teenage Dream" a "perfectly written pop song" and referenced it in her own work. The album's influence has continued, with artists like Tate McRae and Chappell Roan covering "The One That Got Away" in live performances.

== Track listing ==
Standard edition
| No. | Title | Writer(s) | Producer(s) | Length |
|---|---|---|---|---|
| 1. | "Teenage Dream" | Katy Perry; Lukasz Gottwald; Max Martin; Benjamin Levin; Bonnie McKee | Dr. Luke; Benny Blanco; Martin | 3:47 |
| 2. | "Last Friday Night (T.G.I.F.)" | Perry; Gottwald; Martin; McKee | Dr. Luke; Martin | 3:50 |
| 3. | "California Gurls" (featuring Snoop Dogg) | Perry; Gottwald; Martin; Levin; McKee; Calvin Broadus | Dr. Luke; Blanco; Martin | 3:56 |
| 4. | "Firework" | Perry; Mikkel S. Eriksen; Tor Erik Hermansen; Sandy Wilhelm; Ester Dean | Stargate; Sandy Vee | 3:47 |
| 5. | "Peacock" | Perry; Eriksen; Hermansen; Dean | Stargate | 3:51 |
| 6. | "Circle the Drain" | Perry; Christopher Stewart; Monte Neuble | Stewart; Kuk Harrell^{[a]} | 4:32 |
| 7. | "The One That Got Away" | Perry; Gottwald; Martin | Dr. Luke; Martin | 3:47 |
| 8. | "E.T." | Perry; Gottwald; Martin; Joshua Coleman | Dr. Luke; Ammo; Martin | 3:26 |
| 9. | "Who Am I Living For?" | Perry; Stewart; Neuble; Brian Thomas | Stewart; Harrell^{[a]} | 4:08 |
| 10. | "Pearl" | Perry; Greg Wells; Stewart | Wells | 4:07 |
| 11. | "Hummingbird Heartbeat" | Perry; Stewart; Stacy Barthe; Neuble | Stewart; Harrell^{[a]} | 3:32 |
| 12. | "Not Like the Movies" | Perry; Wells | Wells | 4:01 |
| Total length: | | | | 46:44 |

Disc two: Dream On deluxe edition
| No. | Title | Writer(s) | Producer(s) | Length |
|---|---|---|---|---|
| 1. | "If We Ever Meet Again" (Timbaland featuring Katy Perry) | James Washington; Timothy Mosley; Michael Busbee | Jim Beanz^{[d]}; Timbaland | 4:53 |
| 2. | "Starstrukk" (3OH!3 featuring Katy Perry) | Sean Foreman; Nathaniel Motte | Matt Squire^{[e]}; 3OH!3^{[e]} | 3:22 |
| 3. | "California Gurls" (Passion Pit main mix; featuring Snoop Dogg) | Perry; Gottwald; Martin; Levin; McKee; Broadus | Dr. Luke; Blanco; Martin; Passion Pit^{[c]} | 4:12 |
| 4. | "California Gurls" (Armand van Helden remix; featuring Snoop Dogg) | Perry; Gottwald; Martin; Levin; McKee; Broadus | Dr. Luke; Blanco; Martin; Armand van Helden^{[c]} | 5:49 |
| 5. | "Teenage Dream" (Kaskade club remix) | Perry; Gottwald; Martin; Levin; McKee | Dr. Luke; Blanco; Martin; Kaskade^{[c]} | 6:27 |
| Total length: | | | | 75:54 |

2023 exclusive teenager edition
| No. | Title | Writer(s) | Producer(s) | Length |
|---|---|---|---|---|
| 13. | "The One That Got Away" (acoustic) | Perry; Gottwald; Martin | Jon Brion | 4:19 |
| 14. | "Part of Me" | Perry; Gottwald; Martin; McKee | Dr. Luke; Martin; Cirkut | 3:36 |
| 15. | "Wide Awake" | Perry; Gottwald; Martin; McKee; Henry Walter | Dr. Luke; Cirkut | 3:41 |
| 16. | "Dressin' Up" | Perry; Stewart; Neuble; Matt Thiessen | Stewart; Harrell^{[a]} | 3:43 |
| 17. | "E.T." (featuring Kanye West) | Perry; Gottwald; Martin; Coleman | Dr. Luke; Ammo; Martin | 3:51 |
| 18. | "Last Friday Night (T.G.I.F.)" (featuring Missy Elliott) | Perry; Gottwald; Martin; McKee | Dr. Luke^{[b]}; Cirkut^{[c]}; Martin | 3:59 |
| 19. | "Tommie Sunshine's Megasix Smash-Up" | Perry; Gottwald; Martin; Levin; McKee; Broadus; Coleman; Eriksen; Hermansen; Wilhelm; Dean | Tommie Sunshine | 7:03 |
| Total length: | | | | 1:17:01 |

=== Notes ===
- ^{^[a]} signifies a vocal producer
- ^{^[b]} signifies a remixer
- ^{^[c]} signifies a remixer and additional producer
- ^{^[d]} signifies a main and vocal producer
- ^{^[e]} signifies a main producer and remixer
- Passion Pit main mix of "California Gurls" and Kaskade club remix of "Teenage Dream" appear as hidden tracks in "Not Like the Movies", for physical releases of the North American standard CD edition. The tracks are also included on the Japanese standard CD edition, as tracks 14 and 15. No other regions included these hidden tracks on physical copies of the album, until they were later released on disc two of the Dream On edition.
- Japanese standard edition includes the Innerpartysystem main mix of "California Gurls".
- Digital deluxe edition includes the Passion Pit main mix and Mstrkrft main mix of "California Gurls", Kaskade club remix of "Teenage Dream" and Cory Enemy & Mia Moretti vocal club mix of "Peacock" as bonus tracks.
- International iTunes Store and select regions include the Cory Enemy & Mia Moretti vocal club mix of "Peacock" on disc two.

== Personnel ==
Adapted from the Teenage Dream liner notes.

- Ammo – drums, keyboards, programming, producer (track 8)
- Benny Blanco – drums, keyboards, programming, producer (tracks 1, 3)
- Dr. Luke – drums (1–3, 7–8), keyboards (1–3, 7–8), programming (1–3, 7–8), producer (1–3, 7, 8), executive producer
- Mikkel S. Eriksen – recording engineer (4), producer (5), instrumentation (4–5)
- Nicolas Essig – assistant engineer
- Fabien Waltmann – synthesizer, music programming (track 10)
- Josh Freese – drums (tracks 6, 11)
- Charles Malone – guitar (track 6), assistant engineer
- Max Martin – drums (1–3, 7–8), keyboards (1–3, 7–8), programming (1–3, 7–8), producer (1–3, 7–8), executive producer
- Julio Miranda – guitar (track 6)
- Monte Neuble – keyboards (tracks 9, 11)
- Tucker Bodine – assistant engineer
- Randy Urbanski – engineer
- Luis Navarro – assistant engineer
- Nick Chahwala – other sounds, guitar (track 6)
- Chris "Tek" O'Ryan – recording engineer (tracks 6, 9, 11), guitar engineer
- Brent Paschke – guitar (tracks 9, 11)
- L. Leon Pendarvis – arranger (track 7), conductor
- Katy Perry – vocals (All tracks), piano, guitar, songwriter, producer, executive producer
- Lenny Pickett – saxophone (track 2)
- Serban Ghenea – mixing (1–3, 5, 7–8, 10–12)
- John Hanes – mix engineer (1–3, 5, 7–8, 10–12)
- Daniel Silvestri – bass guitar, guitar (track 6)
- Snoop Dogg – vocals (track 3)
- Stargate – producer
- Tricky Stewart – keyboards (9, 11), producer, drum programming (6, 9, 11)
- Greg Wells – synthesizer (track 10), piano (10, 12), drums (10, 12), programming (10, 12), producer (10, 12)
- Will Cotton – photography

== Charts ==
=== Weekly charts ===
Weekly chart performance for Teenage Dream
| Chart (2010–2012) | Peak position |
|---|---|
| Australian Albums (ARIA) | 1 |
| Austrian Albums (Ö3 Austria) | 1 |
| Belgian Albums (Ultratop Flanders) | 10 |
| Belgian Albums (Ultratop Wallonia) | 5 |
| Brazilian Albums (ABPD) | 4 |
| Canadian Albums (Billboard) | 1 |
| Czech Albums (ČNS IFPI) | 8 |
| Danish Albums (Hitlisten) | 14 |
| Dutch Albums (Album Top 100) | 6 |
| European Top 100 Albums (Billboard) | 1 |
| Finnish Albums (Suomen virallinen lista) | 8 |
| French Albums (SNEP) | 3 |
| German Albums (Offizielle Top 100) | 5 |
| Greek Albums (IFPI Greece) | 2 |
| Hungarian Albums (MAHASZ) | 9 |
| Irish Albums (IRMA) | 1 |
| Italian Albums (FIMI) | 3 |
| Japanese Albums (Oricon) | 6 |
| Mexican Albums (AMPROFON) | 11 |
| New Zealand Albums (RMNZ) | 1 |
| Norwegian Albums (VG-lista) | 18 |
| Polish Albums (OLiS) | 7 |
| Portuguese Albums (AFP) | 11 |
| Russian Albums (2M) | 14 |
| Scottish Albums (Official Charts) | 1 |
| South Korean Albums (Circle) | 32 |
| South Korean International Albums (Circle) | 2 |
| Spanish Albums (Promusicae) | 4 |
| Swedish Albums (Sverigetopplistan) | 11 |
| Swiss Albums (Schweizer Hitparade) | 4 |
| UK Albums (Official Charts) | 1 |
| US Billboard 200 | 1 |
| US Indie Store Album Sales (Billboard) | 3 |

| Chart (2025–2026) | Peak position |
|---|---|
| German Pop Albums (Offizielle Top 100) | 4 |
| Greek Albums (IFPI) | 31 |
| Lithuanian Albums (AGATA) | 53 |
| Portuguese Albums (AFP) | 57 |

=== Year-end charts ===
Year-end chart performance for Teenage Dream
| Chart (2010) | Position |
|---|---|
| Australian Albums (ARIA) | 10 |
| Austrian Albums (Ö3 Austria) | 43 |
| Canadian Albums (Billboard) | 20 |
| European Top 100 Albums (Billboard) | 25 |
| French Albums (SNEP) | 45 |
| German Albums (Offizielle Top 100) | 51 |
| Hungarian Albums (MAHASZ) | 96 |
| Italian Albums (FIMI) | 97 |
| Mexican Albums (AMPROFON) | 77 |
| New Zealand Albums (RMNZ) | 8 |
| Russian Albums (2M) | 142 |
| Swiss Albums (Schweizer Hitparade) | 52 |
| UK Albums (Official Charts) | 15 |
| US Billboard 200 | 40 |
| Worldwide Albums (IFPI) | 11 |
| Chart (2011) | Position |
| Australian Albums (ARIA) | 18 |
| Canadian Albums (Billboard) | 5 |
| French Albums (SNEP) | 49 |
| Italian Albums (FIMI) | 76 |
| Mexican Albums (AMPROFON) | 42 |
| New Zealand Albums (RMNZ) | 13 |
| UK Albums (Official Charts) | 25 |
| US Billboard 200 | 10 |
| US Digital Albums (Billboard) | 9 |
| Worldwide Albums (IFPI) | 23 |
| Chart (2012) | Position |
| Canadian Albums (Billboard) | 49 |
| French Albums (SNEP) | 96 |
| Mexican Albums (AMPROFON) | 49 |
| UK Albums (Official Charts) | 48 |
| US Billboard 200 | 25 |
| Worldwide Albums (IFPI) | 50 |
| Chart (2013) | Position |
| UK Albums (Official Charts) | 135 |
| US Billboard 200 | 127 |
| Chart (2015) | Position |
| US Billboard 200 | 166 |
| Chart (2020) | Position |
| Belgian Albums (Ultratop Flanders) | 109 |
| Chart (2021) | Position |
| Belgian Albums (Ultratop Flanders) | 76 |
| UK Albums (Official Charts) | 77 |
| Chart (2022) | Position |
| Belgian Albums (Ultratop Flanders) | 60 |
| Belgian Albums (Ultratop Wallonia) | 178 |
| UK Albums (Official Charts) | 74 |
| US Billboard 200 | 148 |
| Chart (2023) | Position |
| Austrian Albums (Ö3 Austria) | 33 |
| Belgian Albums (Ultratop Flanders) | 38 |
| Belgian Albums (Ultratop Wallonia) | 113 |
| Dutch Albums (Album Top 100) | 56 |
| German Albums (Offizielle Top 100) | 87 |
| New Zealand Albums (RMNZ) | 31 |
| Swiss Albums (Schweizer Hitparade) | 53 |
| UK Albums (Official Charts) | 48 |
| US Billboard 200 | 128 |
| Chart (2024) | Position |
| Austrian Albums (Ö3 Austria) | 14 |
| Belgian Albums (Ultratop Flanders) | 22 |
| Belgian Albums (Ultratop Wallonia) | 109 |
| Canadian Albums (Billboard) | 61 |
| Dutch Albums (Album Top 100) | 43 |
| German Albums (Offizielle Top 100) | 42 |
| Portuguese Albums (AFP) | 119 |
| Swiss Albums (Schweizer Hitparade) | 21 |
| UK Albums (Official Charts) | 44 |
| US Billboard 200 | 111 |
| US Billboard Catalog Albums | 48 |
| Chart (2025) | Position |
| Austrian Albums (Ö3 Austria) | 14 |
| Canadian Albums (Billboard) | 55 |
| Dutch Albums (Album Top 100) | 44 |
| German Albums (Offizielle Top 100) | 36 |
| Hungarian Albums (MAHASZ) | 75 |
| Swiss Albums (Schweizer Hitparade) | 23 |
| UK Albums (Official Charts) | 45 |
| US Billboard 200 | 119 |

=== Decade-end charts ===
Decade-end chart performance for Teenage Dream
| Chart (2010–2019) | Rank |
|---|---|
| Australian Albums (ARIA) | 13 |
| UK Albums (Official Charts) | 19 |
| US Billboard 200 | 44 |

== Certifications and sales ==
Certifications and sales for Teenage Dream
| Region | Certification | Certified units/sales |
|---|---|---|
| Argentina | Gold | |
| Australia (ARIA) Combined with The Complete Confection | 7× Platinum | 490,000^{‡} |
| Austria (IFPI Austria) | Platinum | 20,000^{*} |
| Belgium (BRMA) | Gold | 15,000^{*} |
| Brazil | — | 100,000 |
| Canada (Music Canada) | Diamond | 800,000^{‡} |
| Chile | Gold | 5,000 |
| Colombia | Platinum | |
| Denmark (IFPI Danmark) | 2× Platinum | 40,000^{‡} |
| Finland | 4× Platinum | 80,000 |
| France (SNEP) | 3× Platinum | 300,000^{‡} |
| GCC (IFPI Middle East) | Gold | 3,000^{*} |
| Germany (BVMI) | 2× Platinum | 400,000^{‡} |
| India (IMI) | 2× Platinum | 60,000 |
| Ireland (IRMA) | 2× Platinum | 30,000^{^} |
| Italy (FIMI) | 3× Platinum | 150,000^{‡} |
| Japan (RIAJ) | Gold | 100,000^{^} |
| Mexico (AMPROFON) | Platinum | 60,000^{^} |
| Netherlands (NVPI) | Gold | 25,000^{^} |
| New Zealand (RMNZ) | 11× Platinum | 165,000^{‡} |
| Norway (IFPI Norway) | 5× Platinum | 100,000^{‡} |
| Philippines | Platinum | 30,000 |
| Portugal (AFP) | Gold | 3,500^{‡} |
| Singapore (RIAS) | Platinum | 10,000^{*} |
| Sweden (GLF) Combined with The Complete Confection | Platinum | 40,000^{‡} |
| Switzerland (IFPI Switzerland) | 2× Platinum | 60,000^{‡} |
| United Kingdom (BPI) | 7× Platinum | 2,100,000^{‡} |
| United States (RIAA) | Diamond | 10,000,000^{‡} |
Summaries
| Europe (IFPI) | Platinum | 1,000,000^{*} |
| Worldwide | — | 12,000,000 |
^{*} Sales figures based on certification alone.^{^} Shipments figures based on certification alone.^{‡} Sales+streaming figures based on certification alone.

== Release history ==
Release history and formats for Teenage Dream
| Region | Date | Format | Edition | Label | Ref. |
|---|---|---|---|---|---|
| United States | August 24, 2010 | CD; digital download; LP | Standard; deluxe | Capitol | |
| Philippines | August 24, 2010 | CD; digital download; LP | Standard; deluxe | PolyEast | |
| Canada | August 24, 2010 | CD; digital download; LP | Standard; deluxe | EMI Music Canada | |
| Italy | August 24, 2010 | CD; digital download; LP | Standard; deluxe | EMI | |
| Mexico | August 24, 2010 | CD; digital download; LP | Standard; deluxe | EMI Music Mexico | |
| Japan | August 25, 2010 | CD; digital download; LP | Standard; deluxe; Dream On | EMI Music Japan | |
| United States | August 26, 2010 | CD; digital download; LP | Dream On | Capitol | |
| Hong Kong | August 27, 2010 | CD; digital download; LP | Standard; deluxe | EMI | |
| United Kingdom | August 27, 2010 | CD; digital download; LP | Standard; deluxe | Capitol | |
| Colombia | August 28, 2010 | CD; digital download; LP | Standard; deluxe | EMI | |
| Various | August 30, 2010 | CD; digital download; LP | Standard; deluxe | EMI | |
| Argentina | September 15, 2010 | CD; digital download; LP | Standard; deluxe | EMI | |
| Various | October 20, 2023 | LP | Standard; Exclusive Teenager | Universal Music | |

== See also ==
- List of 2010 albums
- List of best-selling albums in the United States
- List of Billboard 200 number-one albums of 2010
- List of number-one albums from the 2010s (New Zealand)
- List of number-one albums of 2010 (Australia)
- List of number-one hits of 2010 (Austria)
- List of number-one albums of 2010 (Canada)
- List of number-one albums of 2010 (Ireland)
- List of UK Albums Chart number ones of the 2010s
- List of albums which have spent the most weeks on the UK Albums Chart
