= Katy Perry: Part of Me =

2012 documentary film

- Theatrical release poster
- Directed by: Dan Cutforth; Jane Lipsitz; 3D concert footage directed by Nick Wickham
- Produced by: Brian Grazer; Katy Perry; Steven Jensen
- Starring: Katy Perry
- Edited by: Scott Evans; Scott Richter; Brian Lazarte
- Music by: Deborah Lurie
- Production companies: Insurge Pictures; MTV Films; Imagine Entertainment; Perry Productions; AEG Live; EMI Music; Pulse Films; Magical Elves Productions; Splinter Films
- Distributed by: Paramount Pictures
- Release date: July 5, 2012 (United States)
- Running time: 94 minutes
- Country: United States
- Language: English
- Budget: $13 million
- Box office: $32.7 million

Katy Perry: Part of Me (advertised as Katy Perry: Part of Me 3D) is a 2012 American 3D autobiographical documentary concert film about Katy Perry. It was directed by Dan Cutforth and Jane Lipsitz and released in the United States, Canada, the UK and Ireland on July 5, 2012. The film follows Perry through her California Dreams Tour while providing an insight into the singer's journey through stardom and detailing various aspects of her professional and personal life. It is interspersed with various moments of emotional weight and deep significance to Perry.

Produced on a budget of $13.2 million, the film has grossed nearly $33 million worldwide, making it the second highest grossing music concert film ever by a female artist, while ranking fifth overall. Part of Me currently sits as the eleventh highest grossing documentary in U.S. box-office history. It received positive reviews for successfully conveying an effective understanding of Perry as an individual, while also garnering praise for her willingness to allow audiences an up-close appreciation of her personal life.

== Summary ==
The film features interviews with Perry and her loved ones documenting the trajectory of her life, containing various clips from her childhood and teenage years, as well as her career and personal life. The film is spliced with performances from her global California Dreams Tour, which included 127 concerts from February 20, 2011, to January 22, 2012. Most of the performances were recorded on November 23, 2011, at the Staples Center in Los Angeles, but performances in Tokyo and São Paulo were also included. Other singers such as Rihanna, Lady Gaga, Adele, Justin Bieber, and Jessie J make cameos in the film. The documentary includes scenes of Perry dealing with the breakdown of her marriage to English actor and comedian Russell Brand.

== Cast ==
Principal cast

- Katy Perry
- Makena Licon
- Glen Ballard
- Shannon Woodward
- Angela Hudson
- Mia Moretti
- Bonnie McKee
- Adam Marcello
- Matthew Hooper
- Todd Delano
- Angelica Cob-Baehler
- Johnny Wujek
- Shayk
- Tasha Layton
- Elle Ball
- Rachael Markarian
- Leah Adler
- Scott Myrick
- Lockhart Brownlie
- Keith Hudson
- Mary Perry
- David Hudson
- Ashley Dixon
- Tamra Natisin
- Hugh Jackman as himself (Reporter 1)
- Hiroyuki Sanada as himself (Reporter 2)
- Rila Fukushima as herself

Cameos

- Kesha
- Adele
- Rihanna
- Lady Gaga
- Britney Spears
- Carly Rae Jepsen
- Rebecca Black
- Russell Brand (uncredited)
- Whoopi Goldberg (uncredited)
- Justin Bieber (uncredited)
- Jessie J (uncredited)
- Bella Thorne (uncredited)
- The Matrix (archive footage)

== Background and promotion ==
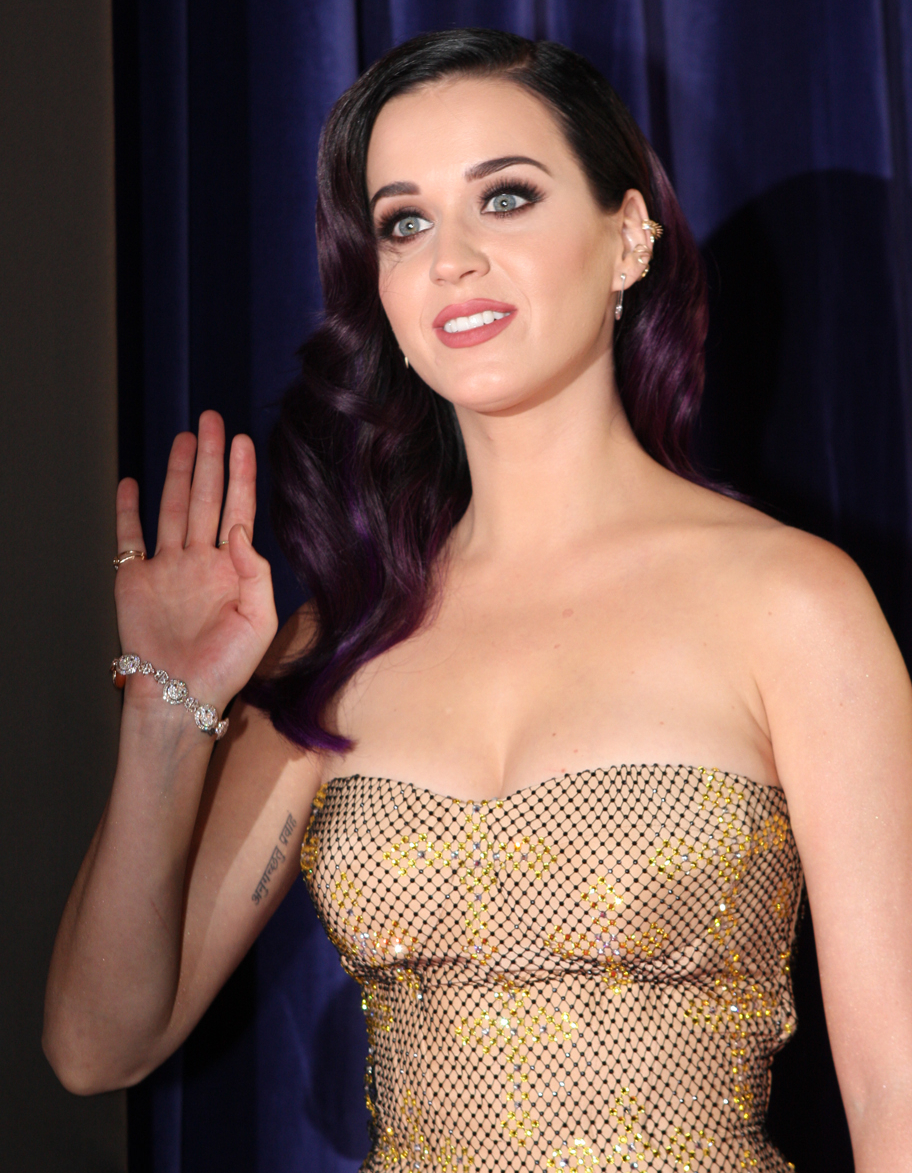
Perry at the premiere of Part of Me in Australia

On March 7, 2012, Katy Perry announced via Twitter that she and Paramount Pictures would release a part-biopic, part-concert film entitled Katy Perry: Part of Me in mid-2012. She told MTV News that the film was the closing to the Teenage Dream era, and explained what to expect, stating: "It's closing the chapter on Teenage Dream, but it's giving you such an inside perspective... This film, you're going to see it from my best friend/buddy perspective, you're going to see exactly what I mean and feel and think about everything." She also cited Madonna's documentary film Madonna: Truth or Dare (1991) as a major influence on Part of Me.

One golden ticket to the movie premiere was placed in a random physical copy of Teenage Dream: The Complete Confection. The first trailer of the film was aired during the 2012 Kids' Choice Awards. On March 31, 2012, Katy announced via Twitter that the film would be released during the weekend of July 4. A trailer of the film was released on April 2, 2012, on iTunes Stores worldwide. Perry teamed up with Pepsi to promote the film. The partnership included co-branded television and radio spots, digital advertising and retail displays. All elements of the campaign featured Pepsi's new global tag line, "Live for Now". The campaign offered consumers the chance to win trips to attend the world premiere of the film in Los Angeles, which included a live performance by Perry. Perry held and attended premieres in Sydney, Australia and London, England, where she walked the "Pink Carpet". On July 30, 2012, there was a premiere in Rio de Janeiro, Brazil with the presence of Perry. Special 3D glasses were designed and distributed in theaters. The glasses featured a red and white "candy stripe" motif common to Perry's visual style and also featured the film's official Twitter hashtag.

== Release ==
This film was rated PG "for some suggestive content, language, thematic elements and brief smoking" by the Motion Picture Association of America.

=== Critical reception ===
Review aggregate website Rotten Tomatoes reported that 75% of critics gave the film positive reviews, with a rating average of 6.40/10, based on 88 reviews. The critical consensus states: "Katy Perry: Part of Me succeeds on the strengths of the pop star's genuine likability, inspiring work ethic, and dazzling stage show, even if it plays somewhat like a PR puff piece at times." At the website Metacritic, which assigns a normalized rating out of 100 to reviews from mainstream critics, the film has received a rating average of 57, based on 24 reviews, indicating "mixed or average" reviews. Audiences polled by the market research firm CinemaScore gave Katy Perry: Part of Me an "A" grade on average.

Neil Smith of Total Film stated: "Despite being as garish and manufactured as Perry's multi-coloured hair-don'ts, Part of Me deserves kudos for allowing an element of unpredictability to intrude upon its tween exploitation and sugary vulgarity." Elizabeth Weitzman of New York Daily News said: "Perry may be the world's most high-profile tease, but she sure knows how to show us a good time". Andrew McMurty of FilmInk stated: "Ultimately, Part of Me is for fans, but it should have interest for people interested in celebrity culture".

Negative reviews included Mark Olsen of Boxoffice Pro's claim that: "this supposedly honest behind-the-scenes look at Perry's 2011 world tour often feels more like sharp brand management". Alison Willmore of Time Out also gave the film a generally negative review, saying: "the 3-D performance footage is impressively lavish, though the film's unending idolization of the amiable singer will quickly exhaust all but the most devoted fans".

Critics also noted the film excluded Perry's days on the Warped Tour and breakup with ex-boyfriend Travie McCoy.

=== Box office ===
In its opening weekend, the film grossed $7,138,266 in 2,730 theaters in the United States and Canada, ranking #8 at the box office. Katy Perry: Part of Me has grossed $25,326,071 domestically and $7,400,885 internationally, totaling $32,726,956 worldwide. In the United States, it is the ninth highest-grossing documentary and the fifth highest-grossing music concert film of all time.

=== Home media ===
On September 18, the DVD was released for the film, selling 112,296 copies in its first week, earning a profit of over one million dollars. Additionally, the 3D Blu-ray sold over 200,000 copies within the first two months of release. The movie has also been released digitally, including a stream directly through Perry's Facebook page, which went live on June 20, 2014.

== Awards ==
This film won an award at the 2012 Teen Choice Awards in the category Choice Summer Movie: Comedy/Music.

== Certifications ==
Certifications for "Katy Perry: Part of Me"
Region	Certification	Certified units/sales
United Kingdom (BPI)	Platinum	50,000^{^}
^{‡} Sales+streaming figures based on certification alone.
