= Hummingbird Heartbeat =

2010 song by Katy Perry

Song by Katy Perry

from the album Teenage Dream
- Released: August 24, 2010
- Recorded: 2009
- Studio: The Boom Boom Boom (Burbank); Henson Recording Studios (Los Angeles)
- Genre: Hard rock; pop rock
- Length: 3:32
- Label: Capitol
- Songwriters: Katy Perry; Christopher Stewart; Stacy Barthe; Monte Neuble
- Producer: C. "Tricky" Stewart

Audio video
- "Hummingbird Heartbeat" on YouTube

"Hummingbird Heartbeat" is a song recorded by American singer Katy Perry for her third studio album, Teenage Dream (2010). It was written by Perry, Christopher "Tricky" Stewart, Stacy Barthe, and Monte Neuble. Stewart handled the production of the song, while Kuk Harrell produced Perry's vocals. The song was recorded in 2009, at both the Boom Boom Boom, based in Burbank, California, and Henson Recording Studios, based in Los Angeles. "Hummingbird Heartbeat" was inspired by Perry's boyfriend at the time, Russell Brand. Musically, it is a 1980s-styled hard rock and pop rock song that contains a mixture of elements from electronica and rock music. Lyrically, the song compares the feeling of being in love to the speed of a hummingbird's heartbeat.

The song was released as the 11th track to Teenage Dream on the 24th of August, 2010. Upon the release of Teenage Dream, the song received generally positive reviews from music critics, many of whom labeled it as a potential single choice, although the song was never released in a single format. Despite this, "Hummingbird Heartbeat" charted on the lower regions of the South Korea Gaon International Download Chart, peaking at number 124. The song was also certified Gold by the Australian Recording Industry Association (ARIA) for equivalent sales of 35,000 units in the country.

== Background and composition ==
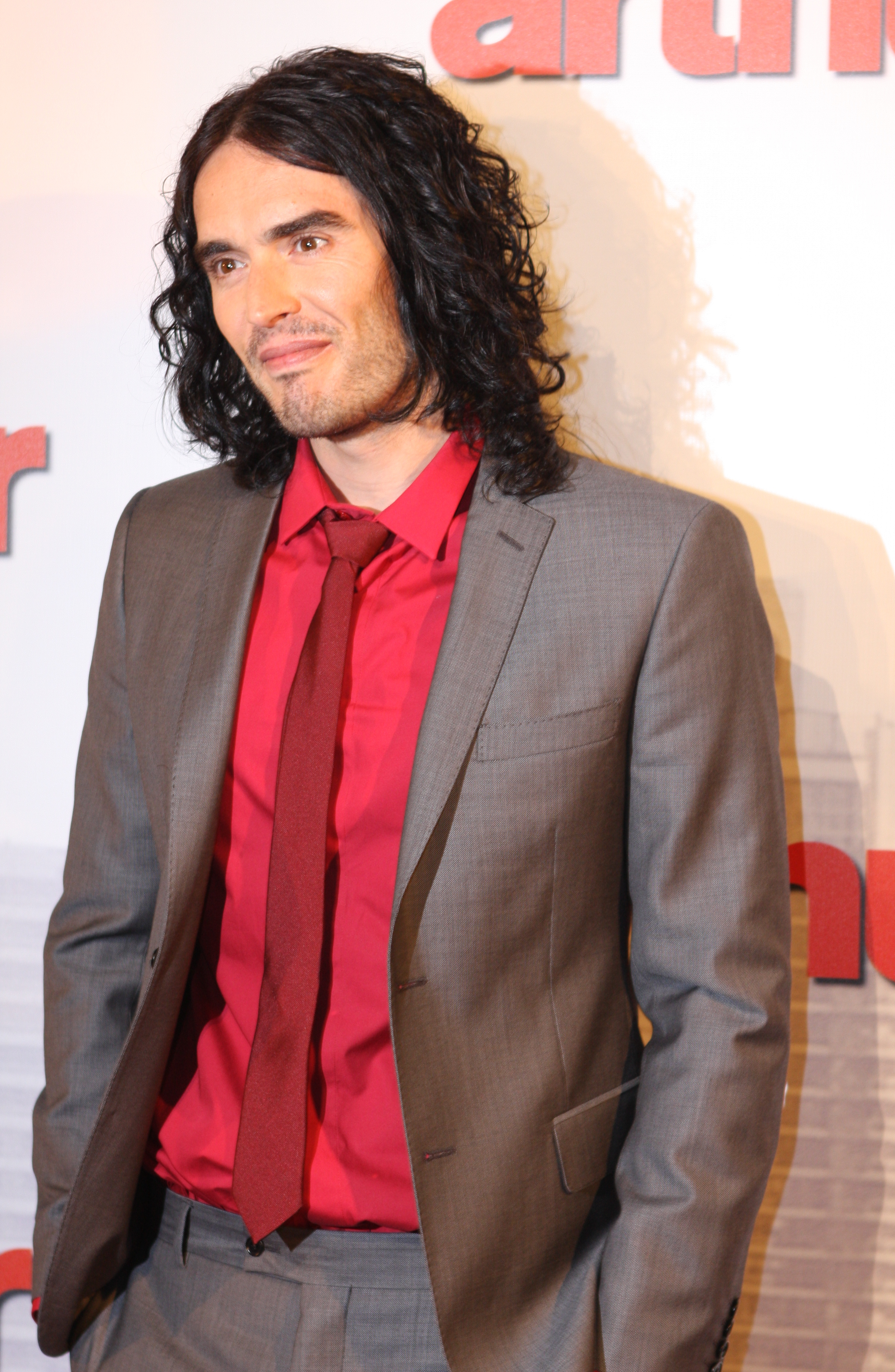
Perry was inspired to write the song after she began dating Russell Brand

In an interview with YouTube about Teenage Dream in August 2010, Perry revealed that "Hummingbird Heartbeat" was one of the first songs she wrote for the album after she finished her Hello Katy Tour (2009). When speaking about the song, Perry said she first had the idea for the song while she was in her hometown of Santa Barbara, California:

"I was at breakfast when I saw this hummingbird, and the hummingbird was having breakfast as well..... and I don't know if you know this but hummingbirds are supposedly good luck and I was thinking 'How fast does their hearts beat?', like 'how many beats per minute?' And using that idea for how someone makes you feel, instead of those butterflies, it makes your heart beat really, really fast."

"Hummingbird Heartbeat" is a 1980s-styled hard rock and pop rock song that contains a mixture of elements from electronica and rock music. The song encompasses electric guitars, a piano, and synthesizers in its production. The song also features an acoustic drum kit, unlike the other songs in the album.

== Reception ==
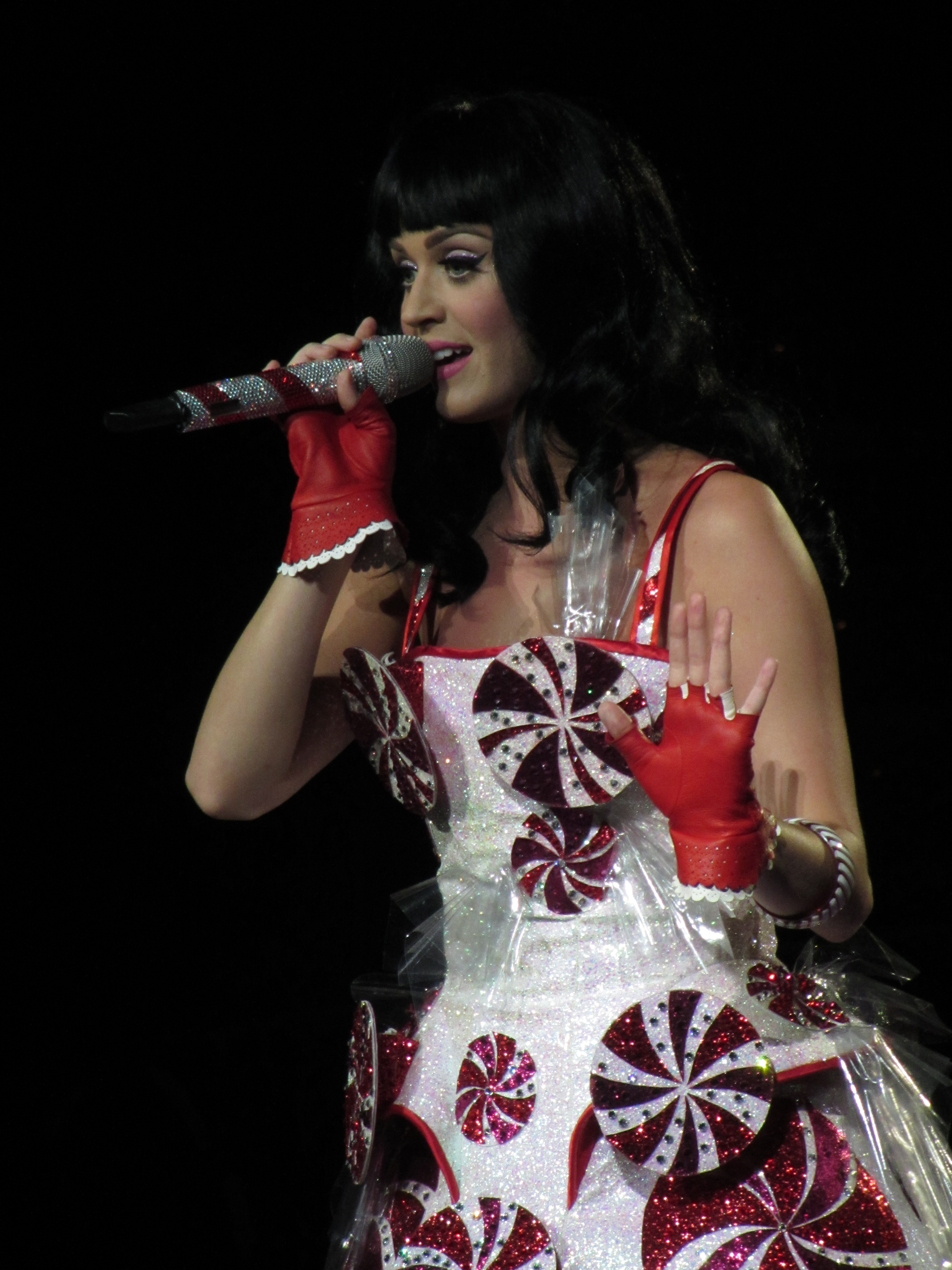
Perry performing "Hummingbird Heartbeat" during California Dreams Tour

Upon the release of the Teenage Dream album, "Hummingbird Heartbeat" charted on the lower regions of the South Korea Gaon International Chart, peaking at 124. Tom Thorogood from MTV gave a positive review of the song, labeling it a strong single choice and calling it a: "nice companion to Teenage Dream, 'the story of the birds and the bees' is more grown up with proper guitars." Jeb Inge of The Journal called "Hummingbird Heartbeat" the strongest song on the album, while Michael Gallucci of Cleveland Scene declared the song an album highlight and compared it to "Teenage Dream", adding that they were both "top-down bangers." Gary Trust from Billboard compared "Hummingbird Heartbeat" to the first five Teenage Dream singles, and felt that if released as a single, would help Perry become the first artist with six number-one singles on the Billboard Hot 100. In July 2013, Robert Copsey and Lewis Corner of Digital Spy said "a full music video and worldwide push would have been more satisfactory".

=== Live performances ===
From February 20, 2011 to January 22, 2012, Perry embarked on the California Dreams Tour, where she performed "Hummingbird Heartbeat". For most of its shows, the song was the second track performed. It preceded "Waking Up in Vegas" and followed "Teenage Dream". The song was not performed live again until the 7th of May, 2025, when a snippet of the song was performed at a show in Houston, as part of The Lifetimes Tour.

== Credits and personnel ==
Credits are adapted from the liner notes of Teenage Dream.

- Katy Perry – vocals, writer
- C. "Tricky" Stewart – producer, writer, keyboards, drum programming
- Brian "B-Luv" Thomas – engineering, guitars recording
- Andrew Wuepper – engineering, vocal sound, guitars recording
- Chris "TEK" O'Ryan – engineering, guitars recording
- Pat Thrall – additional engineering, drum programming
- Luis Navarro – assistant engineer
- Steven Dennis – assistant engineer
- Nicolas Essig – assistant engineer
- Randy Urbanski – assistant engineer
- Serban Ghenea – mixing
- John Hanes – engineering for mix
- Tim Roberts – assistant engineer for mix
- Kuk Harrell – vocals producer
- Brent Paschke – guitars
- Michael Thompson – guitars, bass
- Monte Neuble – writer, keyboards
- Josh Freese – live drums
- Steve Churchyard – engineering for live drums
- Stacy Barthe – writer

== Charts ==
Chart performance for "Hummingbird Heartbeat"
Chart (2010)	Peak position
South Korea International Download (Gaon)	124

== Certifications ==
Certifications for "Hummingbird Heartbeat"
Region	Certification	Certified units/sales
Australia (ARIA)	Gold	35,000^{‡}
^{‡} Sales+streaming figures based on certification alone.
