= Tommie Sunshine =

- Born: Thomas John Norello; March 26, 1971 (age 55); Chicago, Illinois, U.S.
- Origin: Chicago, Illinois, U.S.
- Genres: Electronic, pop, rock, dance-pop
- Occupations: Record producer, songwriter, DJ
- Years active: 1993–present
- Labels: Brooklyn Fire, Brooklyn Blue, Ultra Records, Systematic Recordings, One Love Records, Vicious Recordings, Bemani
- Website: Official Website

Thomas John Norello (born March 26, 1971) known by his stage name as Tommie Sunshine, is an American record producer, remixer, DJ and songwriter of electronic music from Chicago currently living in Brooklyn, New York. He is known for creating dance remixes to popular rock and alternative songs.

== Early life ==
Lorello grew up in Naperville, Illinois. During the 1980s he became interested in DJ mixes he heard on the radio and began attending house-music clubs in the city such as Medusa's. In the early '90s, he traveled to New York City to attend the last "Storm Rave" being thrown by DJ Frankie Bones, which lead to him performing as a popular DJ at raves throughout the Midwest.

== Career ==
Sunshine presently works alongside The Disco Fries and also as a trio with Bart B More and RipTidE under the name Horsepower. In the past he has collaborated with artists such as Felix Da Housecat, Miss Kittin, Marc Romboy, Mark Verbos, Tomcraft, The Aston Shuffle, James Murphy and DJ Hell.

In 2006 Tommie Sunshine remixed the hit songs from the album "You'll Rebel to Anything," "Shut Me Up" and "Straight to Video" by "Mindless Self Indulgence" for their EP "Shut Me Up (The Remixes + 3)." In the same year, he also remixed another hit song by the same band, "What Do They Know," for the band's other EP, "Another Mindless Rip Off."

In 2007, Sunshine released a compilation album on the Ultra Records label as part of their dance compilation CD series titled Ultra.Rock Remixed containing some of his most popular remixes. The follow-up mix CD, Relax This Won't Hurt, was released October 2008. In 2008, he remixed Yoko Ono's new version of "Give Peace a Chance" for a 12" on Twisted, which reached the number 1 position on Billboard's Hot Dance Club Play Chart. He re-affiliated himself with "Mindless Self Indulgence," remixing their hit song from their "If" album, "Never Wanted to Dance".

In 2010, Sunshine remixed Amanda Lear's new single "I'm Coming Up". Two years later, he created a megamix of Katy Perry hit singles: "Teenage Dream", "California Gurls", "The One That Got Away", "Last Friday Night (T.G.I.F.)", "E.T." and "Firework". Named "Tommie Sunshine's Megasix Smash-Up", it was featured on Teenage Dream: The Complete Confection.

Tommie Sunshine was also involved in the music production for Konami's 2008 Dance Dance Revolution video game, DDR X. He contributed two of his new songs, along with his "Brooklyn Fire Re-Touch" mix of Wine Red by The Hush Sound. Sunshine would continue to contribute original compositions for the series' later installments on the Wii, as well as the DDR 2013 and DDR 2014 arcade releases.
