= Not Like the Movies =

Promotional single by Katy Perry

from the album Teenage Dream
- Released: August 3, 2010
- Studio: Rocket Carousel Studio (Los Angeles, California)
- Genre: Pop soul
- Length: 4:01
- Label: Capitol
- Songwriters: Katy Perry; Greg Wells
- Producer: Greg Wells

Lyric video
- "Not Like the Movies" on YouTube

"Not Like the Movies" is a song by American singer Katy Perry from her third studio album, Teenage Dream (2010). She co-wrote the song with its producer Greg Wells. Capitol Records released it on August 3, 2010, as the album's first promotional single. The song is a pop soul power ballad from the point of view of a teenage girl. Lyrically, the girl contemplates her first time and how "it wasn't right". She realizes through that experience that her "prince" is still "out there" waiting for her. It was written when Perry first started dating her then-husband, Russell Brand.

Some music critics called "Not Like the Movies" a powerful and lovely song, as well a contemplative ballad, but noticed that the song's lyrics make only minimal reference to Brand. Commercially, the track peaked at number 53 on US Billboard Hot 100 chart and at number 41 on the Canadian Hot 100 chart. Perry performed the song on her California Dreams Tour (2011). She also did a performance of the song along with "Teenage Dream" at the 53rd Annual Grammy Awards on February 13, 2011. The performance received positive reviews from music critics.

== Conception ==
In an interview with YouTube about Teenage Dream in August 2010, Perry revealed that "Not Like the Movies" was the first song she wrote for the album after she finished her Hello Katy Tour (2009). Production and additional writing on the songs were done by Greg Wells, who previously worked with the singer on her second studio album, One of the Boys (2008). Perry considers it to be like that of a two-part song because she had started working on "Not Like the Movies" before she met Brand, and completed it after they began dating. She stated it is a "really special" song to her because, at the first part of the track, it is a story that she needed to let out, which was claiming to know something that you do not actually know. Perry later expressed relief at being able to put all of her feelings into "Not Like the Movies".

== Composition ==
"Not Like the Movies"
A 24-second sample of the song, featuring Perry singing the chorus.

"Not Like the Movies" is a power ballad that lasts for four minutes and one second. The song is composed in the key of A♭ major and is set in time signature of common time, with a moderate tempo of 100 beats per minute. Perry's vocal range spans over an octave, from F_{3} to E♭_{5}. The song has a basic sequence of A♭5–Fm7–Cm–E♭ as its chord progression. Lyrically, "Not Like the Movies" is a song about a love relationship where a woman does not feel in love and still waits for the man of her dreams, or "charming prince", as a Terra reviewer put it. Chris Ryan from MTV News interpreted the song as largely being about how being in love does not meet your expectations and never really captures "the cinematic magic of big-screen love stories."

Steve Leftridge from PopMatters considered the track to have a "ho-hum" melody. Its melody was compared to Britney Spears' "Everytime" (2003) and Evanescence's "My Immortal" (2003). During the chorus, Perry sings about holding out for a love that is "cinematic and dramatic/With the perfect ending" and later asks if she is a "stupid girl", according to Elysa Gardner from USA Today and an anonymous reviewer for Portrait Magazine. A reviewer for Portrait Magazine, considering it to be the slowest-paced song on Teenage Dream, said it juxtaposed well with the other tracks. "It takes all the energy from the rest of the album, all the fast beating hearts and overwhelming feelings of love, and slows it all down to a song about looking for love instead," they wrote.

== Critical reception ==
"When Katy Perry is flipping out in a ballad such as 'Not Like the Movies,' sobbing on the floor over her tragic love life, she's in a proud tradition of suburban girls who like their emotional meltdowns Hollywood-size."

— Rob Sheffield of Rolling Stone

Chris Ryan of MTV said the song is "rather lovely", but noted that its lyrics refer "very little" to Perry's then-husband, Russell Brand. Elysa Gardner of USA Today called "Not Like the Movies" an "irresistible power ballad" and recommended readers to purchase the song. A staff writer for Portrait Magazine stated that "Not Like the Movies" was a great way to end Teenage Dream and that it showcases the singer's voice quite well, as she has "lyrics to work for instead of ones to just play around with." The reviewer concluded that it was a "really good song."

== Commercial performance ==
Following its release as a promotional single, "Not Like the Movies" managed to enter music charts based on legally paid digital download sales. For the week ending August 11, 2010, "Not Like the Movies" debuted at number 53 on the US Billboard Hot 100 chart, and stayed on the chart for only one week. It also managed to enter another Billboard component chart, the Hot Digital Songs, where the song found its peak at number 22, selling 57,000 digital downloads. On the Canadian Hot 100, the song's highest position was at number forty-one. The song has been certified gold by the Recording Industry Association of America (RIAA) for equivalent sales of 500,000 units in the United States. The song was also certified Gold by the Australian Recording Industry Association (ARIA) for equivalent sales of 35,000 units in Australia.

== Live performances ==
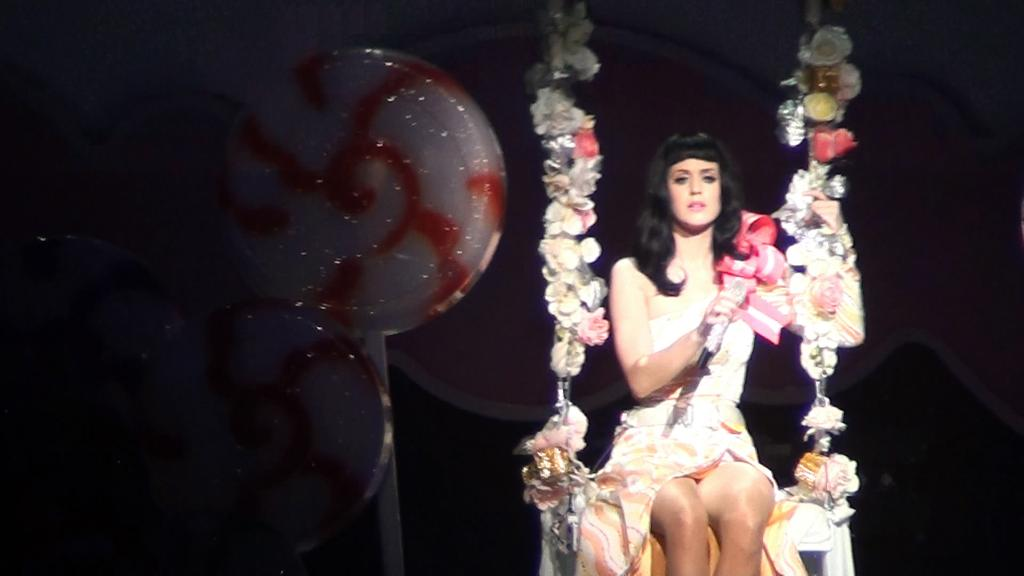
Perry performing "Not Like the Movies" on the California Dreams Tour in 2011

Perry included the song on her setlist for her 2011 world concert tour entitled California Dreams Tour. For performances of the song, she would sit on a flower-entwined bower swing that rises up to reveal a large white bridal train that flows out to complete the entire backdrop. At the same time, a bubble machine started-up and the bed-sheet hanging behind her showed footage of cartoon animals falling in love. In a review of one of her concerts Ed Masley from The Arizona Republic called her performance of "Not Like the Movies" was "sweet".

The song was also performed live during the 53rd Annual Grammy Awards. Dressed in a sparkly pale-pink, "princess-like" dress and wearing glittery make-up, Perry sat on a swing that continued to rise high above the stage as she sang the lyrics to "Not Like the Movies". MTV News reporter Mawuse Ziegbe called it a "heartfelt tribute". Claire Suddath of Time magazine said the "Valentine's Day–themed performance coupled with Perry's wedding footage made-up for the swing that looked like a high school–yearbook photo backdrop". She gave it a Suddath "B+" rating. Jon Bream of Star Tribune gave it a B grade.

"Not Like the Movies" was not included in the setlist of the Lifetimes Tour (2025), but was performed as part of the "Choose Your Own Adventure" set in few North America shows.

== Credits and personnel ==
Credits adapted from the Teenage Dream liner notes.

- Katy Perry – songwriting, lead vocals
- Greg Wells – songwriting, producing, drums, piano, programming
- Lewis Tozour – recording
- Serban Ghenea – mixing
- John Hanes – mix engineer
- Tim Roberts – assistant

== Charts ==
Chart performance for "Not Like the Movies"
Chart (2010)	Peak position
Canada Hot 100 (Billboard)	41
US Billboard Hot 100	53

== Certifications ==
Region	Certification	Certified units/sales
Australia (ARIA)	Gold	35,000^{‡}
United States (RIAA)	Gold	500,000^{‡}
^{‡} Sales+streaming figures based on certification alone.
