= Circle the Drain (Katy Perry song) =

Promotional single by Katy Perry

from the album Teenage Dream
- Released: August 10, 2010
- Studio: Studio at the Palms (Las Vegas, Nevada); Triangle Sound Studios & Silent Sound Studios (Atlanta, Georgia); The Boom Boom Boom (Burbank, California); Henson Recording Studios (Los Angeles, California)
- Genre: Disco-rock; gothic rock; hard rock
- Length: 4:32
- Label: Capitol
- Songwriters: Katy Perry; Christopher Stewart; Monte Neuble
- Producer: C. "Tricky" Stewart

Audio video
- "Circle The Drain" on YouTube

"Circle the Drain" is a song by American singer Katy Perry, from her third studio album, Teenage Dream (2010). It was written by Perry, Christopher "Tricky" Stewart and Monte Neuble. Stewart would also produce the song. Lyrically, "Circle the Drain" candidly focuses on a former lover's drug-addiction and the strains it put on both of them. Following its release, several media outlets reported it to have been inspired by her former relationship with Travie McCoy. Capitol Records released the track as a promotional single two weeks before the album's release on August 10.

Critics were divided on the track, with some finding Perry to be in a hypocritical position, given the album's other material. Other reviewers found it nice to see a different side to the singer. The song achieved modest charting, with its highest peak position being number 30 on the Canadian Hot 100. It charted similarly in New Zealand and managed to enter the US Billboard Hot 100 at number 58. "Circle the Drain" has been performed by Perry on her 2011 world tour, California Dreams Tour. On the tour, she was dressed in a catsuit and the stage was decorated in cartoonish meat. Concert reviewers gave her performances mixed reviews.

== Production and composition ==
Along with Christopher "Tricky" Stewart and Monte Neuble, Perry wrote the song entitled "Circle the Drain" for her third studio album, Teenage Dream. A total of 17 music engineers contributed to the track's composition. Upon its release, critics suggested the song was about her former relationship with Gym Class Heroes' lead vocalist Travie McCoy. When MTV asked for his opinion on the track in 2010, McCoy admitted to hearing about "Circle the Drain", but had never actually listened to the song. Nonetheless, he commented: "I heard she put out a song that's about me, or about some old habits or whatever. [And] I look at it like this: I'm just stoked that she finally has a song with some substance on her record. Good job." McCoy, who has been open about his battle with drug addiction, later revealed that at first he found the song comical, but then he became hurt that she threw him under the bus. "There's a way that I had to be felt the wrong way or told the wrong way ... maybe I needed to hear that for myself, but it was definitely grimey," he said in a 2021 No Jumper interview.

'Circle the Drain'
A 27-second sample of the song where Perry sings about the effects her lovers' drug abuse has on her.

"Circle the Drain" is a rant song where, lyrically, Perry is telling off a self-destructive drug-addicted ex-boyfriend. Its candid lyrics also discuss the strains his addiction put on both of them. In the track's chorus, she sings about how she wants to be his lover, not someone who has to take care of him, such as a maternal figure. She also sings about how he had ultimately lost large opportunities. Styled in the genres of disco-rock, gothic rock, and hard rock tones, it is an up-tempo song that lasts for four minutes and 32 seconds, and also has influences of techno. The track is composed in the key of E♭ minor and is set in time signature of common time, with a tempo of 135 beats per minute. Perry's vocal range spans over an octave, from A♭_{3} to D♭_{5}.

Entertainment Weekly writer Leah Greenblatt stated that Perry's lyrical talent is not her strength, adding: "neither, in fact, is rhyming 'forte' with 'foreplay,' as she does painfully on the druggie-boyfriend takedown 'Circle the Drain'." Billboard journalist Monica Herrera found the song to have been inspired by Pat Benatar's material, while Perry herself said: "It's kind of like my 'You Oughta Know' Alanis Morissette moment." Al Fox of BBC News wrote that the song has "menacing undertones" which unveils a different side to Perry, unlike her current "unsolicited residency in many a showbiz column."

== Release and reception ==
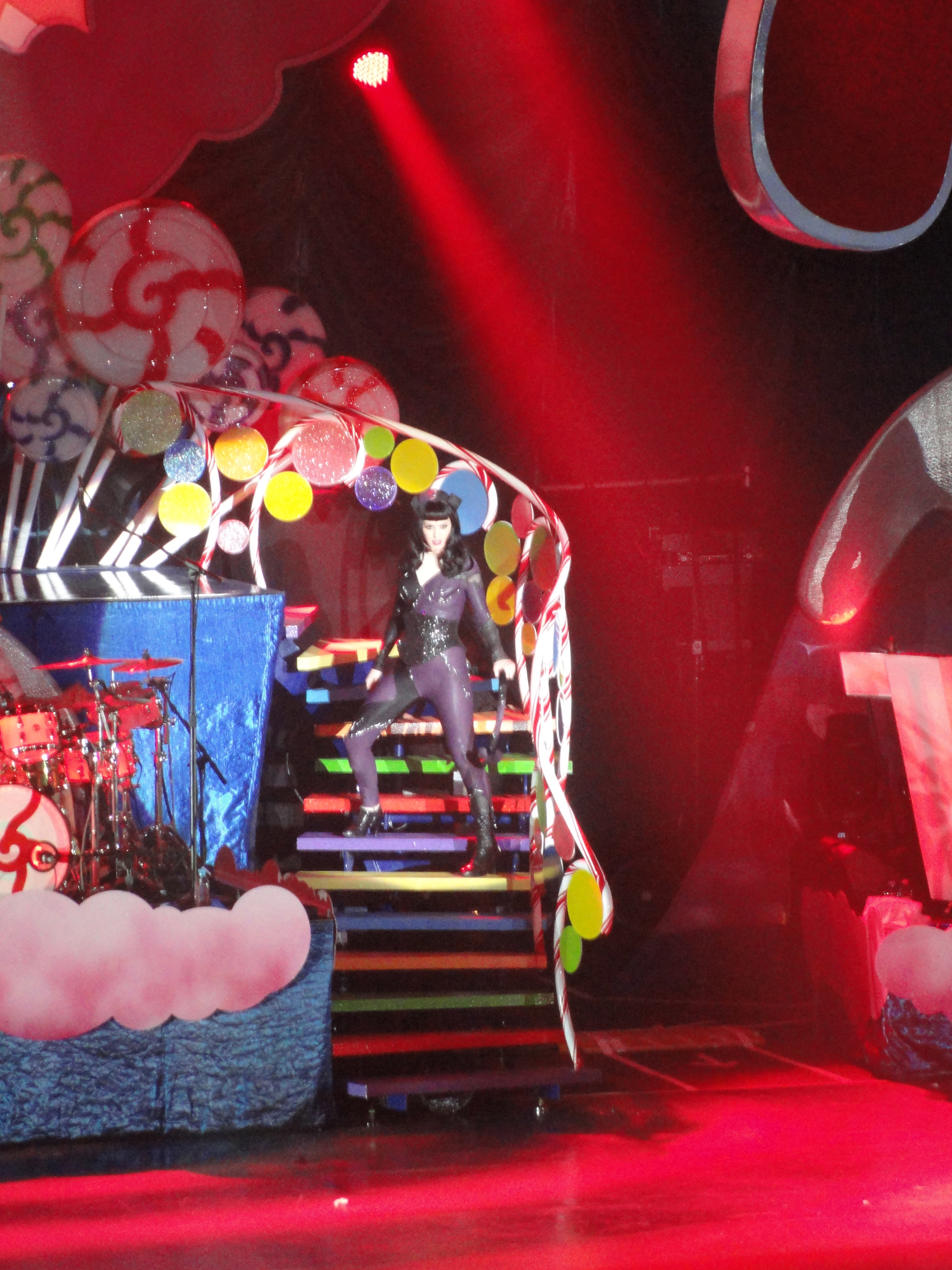
Perry performing the song on her California Dreams Tour in March 2011

Capitol Records released "Circle the Drain" as a promotional single from Teenage Dream two weeks before the album's release on August 10. The song charted modestly and only remained on music charts for its debut week. The track's highest peak position was on the Canadian Hot 100, where it debuted at number 30; "Circle the Drain" became the biggest jump on that chart (28 places, from number 58) for the week ending on August 28. On the New Zealand Singles Chart, the song performed similarly, peaking at number 36 on August 23. Additionally, "Circle the Drain" managed to enter the US Billboard Hot 100 at number 58.

Critical reaction to "Circle the Drain" was mixed. Keri Mason from Billboard believed that tracks like "Circle the Drain" made the Teenage Dream album "get heavier sonically and lyrically, with a boom-boom-pow electro punch". Slant Magazine's Matthew Cole found the singer to be virtually less sympathetic than her former lover. This being because her "put-downs are alternately pedantic" and hypocritical even, as she finds offense to his substance use before foreplay, but was singing about blacking out and hooking up on another of the album's tracks – "Last Friday Night (T.G.I.F.)". Chris Richards of The Washington Post had a similar reaction, finding it impossible to take any of the cautionary advice "Circle the Drain" offered, as Perry had just bragged about being very drunk on the very same record.

MTV News reporter James Montgomery, said when discussing several tracks on Teenage Dream, one of which included "Circle the Drain", that "they are all really pretty great" and are "destined to be smash hits." Yahoo! Music journalist Chris Parkin found the song to be the only track on Teenage Dream to offer something deep and dark, citing the lyric "You fall asleep during foreplay because the pills you take are more your forté". In his review of the record for PopMatters, Steve Leftridge stated that tracks such as "Circle the Drain" are not strong, edgy or clever enough "to lend any genuine credibility to Perry as a serious artist with anything to actually say."

== Live performances ==
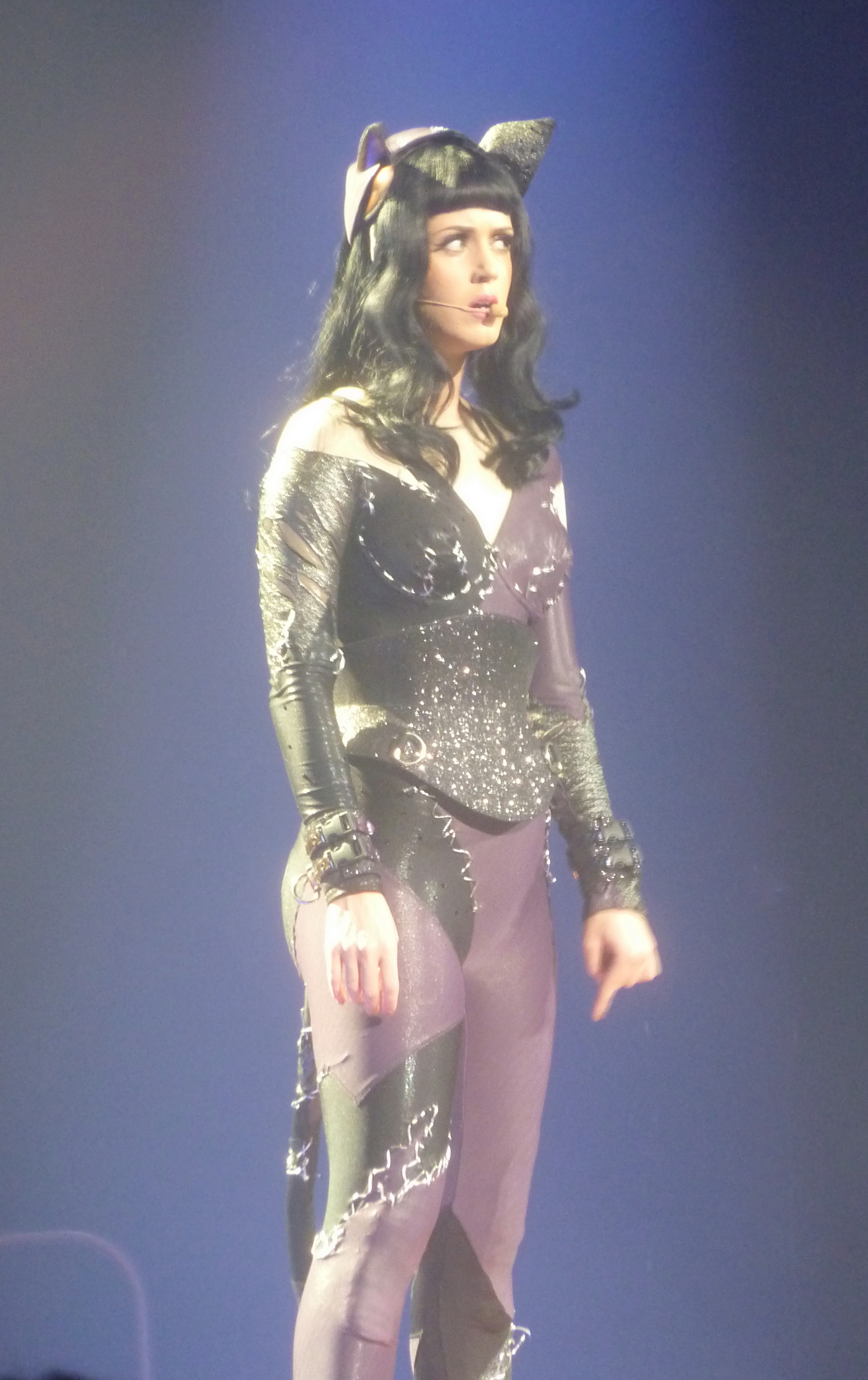
Perry performing the song on her California Dreams Tour in March 2011

Perry included the song on the setlist for her 2011 world concert tour entitled California Dreams Tour. For performances of the track, the stage was decorated with cartoonish link sausages and rib-eye steak that dangled from the rafters, while Perry was dressed in a catsuit. Along with Perry's performances of "Teenage Dream" and "E.T.", music blog Idolator staff writer Erika Brooks Adickman cited "Circle the Drain" as being a highlight of the tour. The Patriot Ledger's Jay N. Miller found "Circle the Drain" to be "the most rocking" out of the setlist's line-up at TD Garden.

In contrast, The Hollywood Reporter quoted Rolling Stone's Meredith Blake in her concert review saying she found it pointless to have those items onstage given the song's theme. Writing for NME, Emily MacKay did a live review of the singer's tour at the Hammersmith Apollo in London during March 2011. She said that the spiritless "Circle the Drain", "Hummingbird Heartbeat" and "Who Am I Living For?" were enough to make you feel somewhat like that of a "fractious toddler having a series of expensive toys waved in its mottled face by a fretful aunt to keep it from deciding it wants to cry."

== Credits and personnel ==
- Vocals: Katy Perry
- Songwriting: Katy Perry, Christopher "Tricky" Stewart, Monte Neuble
- Production: Christopher "Tricky" Stewart

Credits adapted from Teenage Dream album liner notes.

== Charts ==
Chart performance for "Circle the Drain"
Chart (2010)	Peak position
Canada Hot 100 (Billboard)	30
New Zealand (Recorded Music NZ)	36
US Billboard Hot 100	58
