= Fargetta =

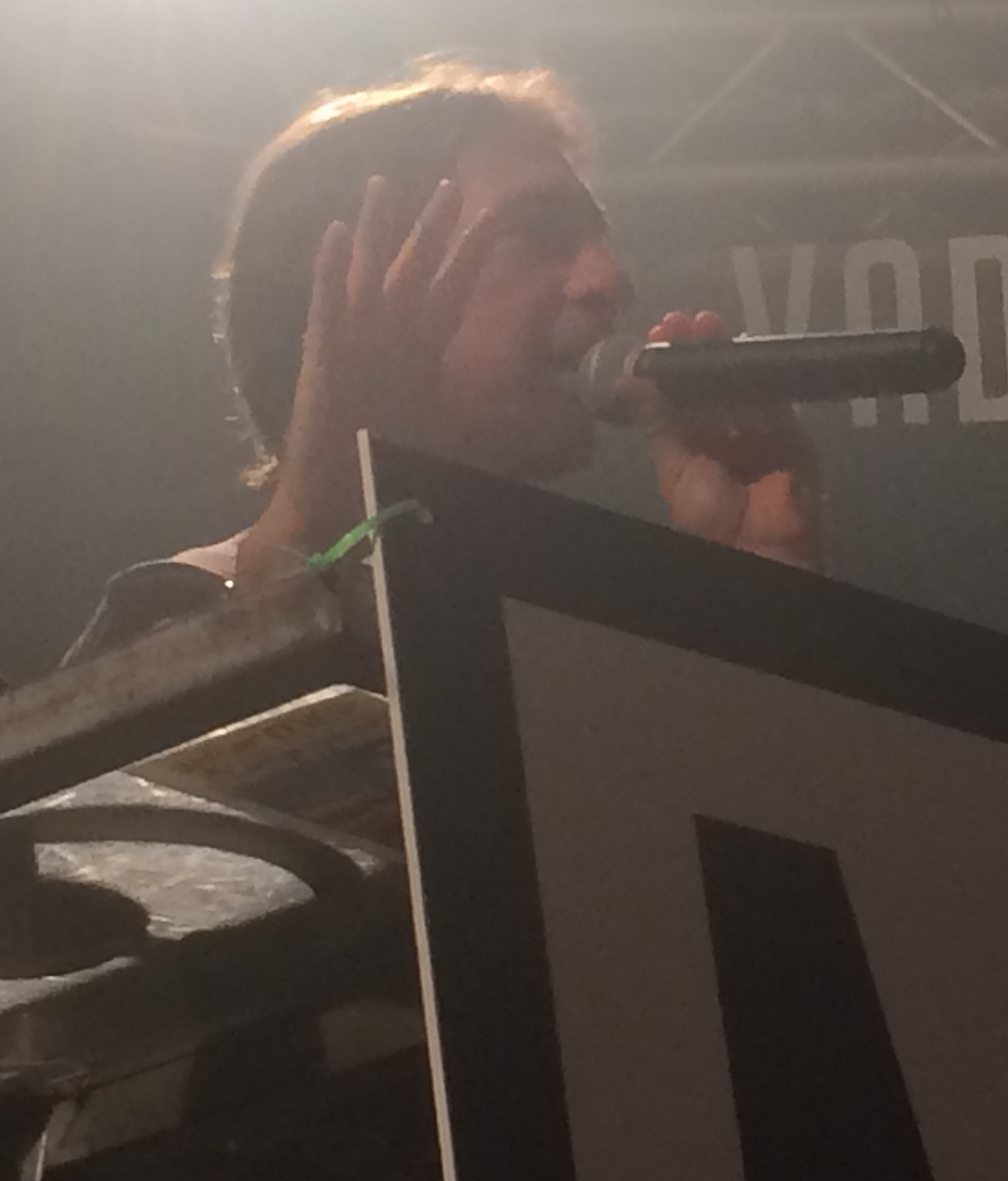

Background information
- Also known as: Fargetta, Get Far
- Born: Mario Fargetta; 19 July 1962 (age 63); Lissone
- Origin: Lissone, Italy
- Genres: House, acid house, trance
- Occupations: Disc jockey, producer, radio personality
- Years active: 1988–present
- Labels: Do It Yourself, Ultra Records, Jive Records, Sony Music, BMG, Robbins Entertainment
- Website: www.fargetta.dj

Mario Fargetta (born 19 July 1962, Italy) is an Italian house/electronic music DJ, producer, songwriter, and remixer. He is best known for his involvement with the groups the Tamperer featuring Maya, and, since 2005, Get Far, which is a pseudonym of both his last name and his desire to take his musical direction beyond the Italian dance sound, of which he has been associated with since the late 1980s. As Get Far, he reached the top of US Hot Dance Airplay chart in August 2010 with the club hit "The Radio".

== Career ==
Fargetta began his career as a DJ and remixer at age 16. It was from there that he would attract the interest and attention of various artists throughout Europe. By 1992, he released his first single under his full name with "Music". In addition to his music career, Fargetta is also a radio DJ, hosting a program on Radio DeeJay in Italy.

In 1997, Fargetta made his first appearance on the Dancemania compilation series at Dancemania 4. He subsequently appeared on Dancemania 5 as its leading mixer.

In 2004, he also composed music for the Italian television version of A Christmas Carol.

In 2006, Fargetta married the Italian television host and radio personality Federica Panicucci.

== Discography ==
As Fargetta:

- "Music" (1992) - UK #34
- "The Music Is Movin'" (1992) - UK #74 US Dance #19
- "Your Love" (1993) - EUR #71
- "This Time (Sexy Night)" (1994)
- "Midnight" (1995)
- "Party Over Here" (1996)
- "The Beat of Green (May Day - May Day)" (1996)
- "Deejay Parade" (1997)
- "Mr. Movin'" (1997)
- "You Got It" (1997)
- "I Will Rise Again" (2001)
- "Good Times" (2002)
- "I'm Leaving You" (2002)
- "Cantare Sognare" (2003)
- "People on the Beat" (2003)
- "Play This Song" (2004)
- "I Don't Know Why" (2005)
- "No Matter" (2007)

As Tamperer featuring Maya:

- "Feel It" (1998) - UK #1
- "If You Buy This Record (Your Life Will Be Better)" (1998) - UK #3
- "Step Out" (1999)
- "Hammer to the Heart" (1999) - UK #6
- "Feel It 2008" (2008)

As Get Far:

- "Music Turns Me On" (2006)
- "Shining Star" (2007) - FR #16, US Hot Dance Airplay #23
- "All I Need" (2008)
- "The Radio" (featuring H-Boogie) (2009) - US Hot Dance Airplay #1
- "Free" (2010)
- "The Champions of the World" (2011)
- "If I Ever" (2013)
