= Heather Leigh West =

American singer-songwriter

- Origin: New York City, U.S.
- Genres: Soul, R&B, dance, house
- Occupations: Singer, songwriter
- Years active: 1995–present
- Website: heatherleighwest.com

Heather Leigh West is an American New York City-based singer and composer best known for her work in house music.

== Early life and education ==
Born into a theater family in New York City, West was always surrounded by creative talent. A graduate of Manhattan's La Guardia High School of Music and the Arts – Vocal Department, she developed her style as a member of the school's Gospel Choir.

== Career ==
=== Early years ===
West has written and recorded songs for herself as well as other artists of many genres including: Soul, R&B, funk, hip hop, gospel, dance and house.

West's commercial debut came as the featured vocalist, credited under the moniker "She", on the 1995 Urban Discharge release, "Drop a House". The release peaked at number twenty-one, spending eleven weeks on the Billboard Hot Dance Club Play Chart and secured its place as a club anthem. Those same lyrics that were featured in "Drop a House" were later sampled in the 1998 single "Feel It" by The Tamperer featuring Maya, which went on to be a bigger hit on Billboard's Hot Dance Club Play, placing it at number 4, and went on to be a number one single in the UK. Despite the song's club success, "Drop a House" was unable to cross over to the airplay charts because it contained lyrics that were at the time considered explicit, while "Feel It" omitted some of the offensive words that helped make their version more radio-friendly.

After nearly a decade of being uncredited by name on the Urban Discharge recording, and later wrongfully credited as the lead vocalist on the "Feel It" single (in this case, Maya from The Tamperer was the actual singer), West decided to re-record the track "Drop a House" with DJ Demarko! for release on Tommy Boy Entertainment's imprint Silver Label in 2009. The updated version, at last crediting West, peaked at number 11 on the Billboard Hot Dance Club Play chart.

=== 2000s ===
In 2000, West teamed up with Eddie X for the release of Vibe the Underground. The project was later featured on The Circuit Party Volume 1 compilation.

In association with German music producer Da Hool in late 2003, West wrote and recorded Set the Stakes High for Germany's Kosmo Records. The single's early success in Europe led to its inclusion on numerous compilations worldwide. Soon after, Set the Stakes High saw its domestic debut on the American dance label Robbins Entertainment in 2004 where the release climbed to number twenty-one on the Billboard Hot Dance Singles Sales Chart.

In 2004, West was asked to take part in a project with FIGJAM Records to benefit the ACLU Foundation's Lesbian & Gay Rights and AIDS Projects. The album, a double-disc set titled Marry Me, with individual discs dubbed Ceremony and Reception, included West's single Eres Tu, produced by the Bodega Boys. Marry Me, which also included, among others, music by RuPaul and Ari Gold, was celebrated on November 16, 2004, at a record release gala held at XL in New York's Chelsea neighborhood.

In 2005, West partnered with New York-based producer DJ Dove for her next single, Lift Me. The track, written by West, was released on Catch 22 Recordings and featured additional mixes by DJ Disciple.

Though still nurturing her career in dance music, West made a departure of sorts from the genre when she began work on her first full-length record in late 2005 with New York-based music producer Valentino LaRosa. The album, a marriage of organic instruments and the synthetic sounds familiar to her dance music fans, is perhaps best described as Alternative/Soul. Appropriately titled, One (Valentino's Heather) the records name not only marks the first of many to come, but more importantly is a reference to unity. Forever striving to do something different from what she has before, West decided to reproduce the same material with a more laid back musical vibe to create a double release with One Extra Chilled – HLW On the Rocks. The album is currently available for preview as digital release on iTunes and is planned for official release on CD later in the year. West released a darkly artistic music video for the album's first single Fall Away. The video is available to view on the popular video sharing website, YouTube.

In late 2007 West returned the studio with music producer DJ Dove to record a new dance single, Closer, co-written by West and fellow songwriters. The much anticipated single will be her first commercially available dance release since 2005. A big room house anthem, Closer beckoning all to "venga mas cerca (Come closer)," was released digitally through beatport.com on October 26, 2008.

=== 2010 to present ===
In early 2010, West appeared as a featured artist on JFortino's release, Fearless People, which she co-wrote along with JFortino and Dawn Tallman (who is also featured on the recording).

Also in 2010, HLW returned to the studio to record Don't Hold Back, the much anticipated follow up project with DaHool. The track is slated for release on the German label We Play Records in late 2010.

In the same year, West joined forces with DJ/Producer Nick Harvey for Pure Love. The project credits HLW as Halo, which the artist explained is an alter ego.

== Discography ==
=== Albums ===
- 2008: One (Valentino's Heather) & One Extra Chilled – HLW On the Rocks (digital release) (HLW Music)
- One (Valentino's Heather) & One Extra Chilled – HLW On the Rocks (CD)

=== Singles ===
- 1995 – Drop a House by Urban Discharge featuring She
- 1999 – Vibe the Underground by Eddie X presents Heather Leigh West
- 2003 – Set the Stakes High by Da Hool featuring Heather Leigh West (Kosmo, Germany; Robbins Entertainment, USA)
- 2004 – Eres Tu by The Bodega Boys featuring Heather Leigh West
- 2005 – Lift Me by DJ Dove featuring Heather Leigh West (Catch 22 Recordings, USA)
- 2008 – Closer by DJ Dove featuring Heather Leigh West (Tendenzia Records, Italy)
- 2009 – Drop a House by DJ DeMarko featuring Heather Leigh West (Tommy Boy/Silver Label, USA)
- 2010 – Fearless People by JFortino featuring Dawn Tallman and Heather Leigh West
- 2010 – Pure Love by DJ Nick Harvey featuring Halo [a.k.a. Heather Leigh West] (Nick Harvey Music, USA)
- 2010 – Don't Hold Back by Da Hool featuring Heather Leigh West (We Play Records, Germany)
