= Somewhere =

Somewhere may refer to:

== Music ==
=== Albums ===
- Somewhere (Eva Cassidy album) or the title song, 2008
- Somewhere (Keith Jarrett album), 2013
- Somewhere – The Songs of Sondheim and Bernstein, by Marina Prior, 1994
- Somewhere, or the title song, by The Tymes, 1963

=== Songs ===
- "Somewhere" (song), from the musical West Side Story, 1956
- "Somewhere" (Bubbles song), 2002
- "Somewhere" (DJ Mog & Sarah Lynn song), 2010
- "Somewhere" (Shanice song), 1994
- "Somewhere", by American Music Club from California, 1988
- "Somewhere", by Jimi Hendrix from People, Hell and Angels, 2013
- "Somewhere", by La Toya Jackson from Bad Girl, 1990
- “Somewhere”, by Riot from Sons of Society, 1999
- “Somewhere”, by Robbie Williams from Reality Killed the Video Star, 2009
- "Somewhere", by Scissor Sisters from Magic Hour, 2012
- "Somewhere", by Soundgarden from Badmotorfinger, 1991
- "Somewhere", by Within Temptation from The Silent Force, 2004

== Other uses ==
- Somewhere (film), a 2010 film directed by Sofia Coppola
- Somewhere (artist collective), a UK-based creative organisation
- Somewhere, a subsidiary of the French retail group Redcats
