= List of Billboard number-one dance songs of 2010 =

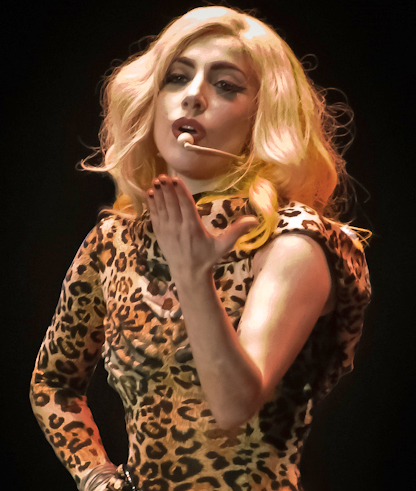
Lady Gaga achieved four number ones on the Hot Dance Club Songs, three on the Hot Dance Singles Sales, and one on the Hot Dance Airplay during 2010.

Billboard magazine compiled the top-performing dance songs in the United States during 2010 on the Hot Dance Club Songs, the Hot Dance Singles Sales, and the Hot Dance Airplay. Premiered in 1976, the Hot Dance Club Songs ranked the most popular songs on dance club based on reports from a national sample of club DJs. The Hot Dance Singles Sales chart was launched in 1985 to compile the best-selling dance singles based on retail sales across the United States. The Hot Dance Airplay was first published in 2003, ranking the songs based on airplay detections on dance radio.

The first club play number-one song of the year was claimed by Lady Gaga with "Bad Romance", a position it held in the last week of 2009, thus spending two weeks atop the chart in total. Multiple artists achieved two number one songs on the chart, including Jennifer Lopez with "Louboutins" and "Fresh Out the Oven", the latter of which was a collaboration with Pitbull and released under Lopez's pseudonym "Lola". Christina Aguilera also achieved two number one songs with "Not Myself Tonight" and "You Lost Me", while Shakira topped the chart with "Did It Again (Lo Hecho Esta Hecho)" and "Loca", a collaboration with Dizzee Rascal. Australian singer-songwriter Kylie Minogue scored two number one songs with "All the Lovers" and "Get Outta My Way".

Beyoncé and Katy Perry were the only artists to achieve three number one songs in 2010; the former with "Why Don't You Love Me", "Telephone", a collaboration with Lady Gaga featuring Beyoncé, and "Video Phone", another collaboration between the two, but with Beyoncé featuring Lady Gaga. Perry attainted three number one songs with "California Gurls", a collaboration with Snoop Dogg, "Teenage Dream", and the promotional single "Peacock". Gaga and Rihanna were the only artists to top the chart four times each. As well as "Bad Romance", "Telephone" and "Videophone", Gaga also reached number one with "Alejandro". Rihanna topped the chart with "Russian Roulette", "Hard", a collaboration with Jeezy, "Rude Boy", and "Only Girl (In the World)". Goldfrapp's "Rocket", which peaked at number one on May 1, ranked at number one on the 2010 Hot Dance Club Songs year end chart.

== Charts history ==
Chart history
| Issue date | Hot Dance Club Songs | | Hot Dance Singles Sales | | Hot Dance Airplay | | Ref. |
| Issue date | Song | Artist(s) | Song | Artist(s) | Song | Artist(s) | Ref. |
|---|---|---|---|---|---|---|---|
| January 2 | "Bad Romance" | Lady Gaga | "Replay" | Iyaz | "Hang On" | Plumb | |
| January 9 | "Make Me" | Janet | "Bad Romance" | Lady Gaga | "Hot" | Inna | |
| January 16 | "One Love" | David Guetta featuring Estelle | "Bad Romance" | Lady Gaga | "Tik Tok" | Kesha | |
| January 23 | "Push N Pull" | Noferini & Marini vs. Sylvia Tosun | "Bad Romance" | Lady Gaga | "Tik Tok" | Kesha | |
| January 30 | "Fresh Out the Oven" | Lola featuring Pitbull | "Bad Romance" | Lady Gaga | "Hot" | Inna | |
| February 6 | "Did It Again (Lo Hecho Esta Hecho)" | Shakira | "Bad Romance" | Lady Gaga | "Tik Tok" | Kesha | |
| February 13 | "Why Don't You Love Me" | Beyoncé | "Bad Romance" | Lady Gaga | "Tik Tok" | Kesha | |
| February 20 | "Russian Roulette" | Rihanna | "Bad Romance" | Lady Gaga | "Tik Tok" | Kesha | |
| February 27 | "Telephone" | Lady Gaga featuring Beyoncé | "Bad Romance" | Lady Gaga | "Bad Romance" | Lady Gaga | |
| March 6 | "Hard" | Rihanna featuring Jeezy | "Bad Romance" | Lady Gaga | "Secret Love" | Kim Sozzi | |
| March 13 | "The Power of Music" | Kristine W | "Bad Romance" | Lady Gaga | "Love Keeps Calling" | AnnaGrace | |
| March 20 | "Acapella" | Kelis | "Telephone" | Lady Gaga featuring Beyoncé | "Love Keeps Calling" | AnnaGrace | |
| March 27 | "Fancy Free" | Sun | "Rocket" | Goldfrapp | "Love Keeps Calling" | AnnaGrace | |
| April 3 | "Louboutins" | Jennifer Lopez | "Crush On You" | Christelle Starring Dizzy D | "Secret Love" | Kim Sozzi | |
| April 10 | "Naturally" | Selena Gomez & the Scene | "Crush On You" | Christelle Starring Dizzy D | "Heartbreak" | M'Black | |
| April 17 | "Give Me Something" | Ono | "Crush On You" | Christelle Starring Dizzy D | "Heartbreak" | M'Black | |
| April 24 | "Heartbreak on Vinyl" | Blake Lewis | "Imma Be" / "Rock That Body" | The Black Eyed Peas | "Sweet Disposition" | The Temper Trap | |
| May 1 | "Rocket" † | Goldfrapp | "Whataya Want from Me" | Adam Lambert | "Rude Boy" | Rihanna | |
| May 8 | "Video Phone" | Beyoncé featuring Lady Gaga | "Whataya Want from Me" | Adam Lambert | "Break Your Heart" | Taio Cruz featuring Ludacris | |
| May 15 | "Rude Boy" | Rihanna | "Telephone" | Lady Gaga featuring Beyoncé | "Ghosts N Stuff" | Deadmau5 featuring Rob Swire | |
| May 22 | "Pyramid" | Charice featuring Iyaz | "Crush On You" | Christelle Starring Dizzy D | "Heartbreak on Vinyl" | Blake Lewis | |
| May 29 | "Imma Be" | The Black Eyed Peas | "Bulletproof" | La Roux | "Naturally" | Selena Gomez & the Scene | |
| June 5 | "Dust in Gravity" | Delerium featuring Kreesha Turner | "Alejandro" | Lady Gaga | "Stereo Love" | Edward Maya & Vika Jigulina | |
| June 12 | "Gettin' Over You" | David Guetta and Chris Willis featuring Fergie and LMFAO | "Alejandro" | Lady Gaga | "Happiness" | Alexis Jordan | |
| June 19 | "Not Myself Tonight" | Christina Aguilera | "Bad Romance" | Lady Gaga | "Gettin' Over You" | David Guetta & Chris Willis Featuring Fergie & LMFAO | |
| June 26 | "Pretty Mess" | Erika Jayne | "Alejandro" | Lady Gaga | "Stereo Love" | Edward Maya & Vika Jigulina | |
| July 3 | "Alejandro" | Lady Gaga | "Alejandro" | Lady Gaga | "Gettin' Over You" | David Guetta & Chris Willis Featuring Fergie & LMFAO | |
| July 10 | "Commander" | Kelly Rowland featuring David Guetta | "Alejandro" | Lady Gaga | "California Gurls" | Katy Perry Featuring Snoop Dogg | |
| July 17 | "Happiness" | Alexis Jordan | "All The Lovers" | Kylie Minogue | "California Gurls" | Katy Perry Featuring Snoop Dogg | |
| July 24 | "Dirty Talk" | Wynter Gordon | "Alejandro" | Lady Gaga | "California Gurls" | Katy Perry Featuring Snoop Dogg | |
| July 31 | "Alive" | Goldfrapp | "Alejandro" | Lady Gaga | "Cooler Than Me" | Mike Posner | |
| August 7 | "Your Love Is My Drug" | Kesha | "Alejandro" | Lady Gaga | "Dynasty" | Kaskade Featuring Haley | |
| August 14 | "All the Lovers" | Kylie Minogue | "Round & Round" | Selena Gomez & The Scene | "Better Than Her" | Matisse | |
| August 21 | "California Gurls" | Katy Perry featuring Snoop Dogg | "Round & Round" | Selena Gomez & The Scene | "Dynamite" | Taio Cruz | |
| August 28 | "I Like It" | Enrique Iglesias featuring Pitbull | "Round & Round" | Selena Gomez & The Scene | "The Radio" | Get Far Featuring H-Boogie | |
| September 4 | "Fire with Fire" | Scissor Sisters | "Round & Round" | Selena Gomez & The Scene | "The Radio" | Get Far Featuring H-Boogie | |
| September 11 | "Dynamite" | Taio Cruz | "Round & Round" | Selena Gomez & The Scene | "We No Speak Americano" | Yolanda Be Cool & DCUP | |
| September 18 | "Figure It Out" | Dave Audé featuring Isha Coco | "Round & Round" | Selena Gomez & The Scene | "Stereo Love" | Edward Maya & Vika Jigulina | |
| September 25 | "Wouldnit (I'm a Star)" | Ono | "Round & Round" | Selena Gomez & The Scene | "Stereo Love" | Edward Maya & Vika Jigulina | |
| October 2 | "Beautiful Monster" | Ne-Yo | "Round & Round" | Selena Gomez & The Scene | "Teenage Dream" | Katy Perry | |
| October 9 | "You Lost Me" | Christina Aguilera | "Round & Round" | Selena Gomez & The Scene | "Teenage Dream" | Katy Perry | |
| October 16 | "Teenage Dream" | Katy Perry | "OMG" | Usher Featuring will.i.am | "I'm in Love (I Wanna Do It)" | Alex Gaudino | |
| October 23 | "Body Shots" | Kaci Battaglia featuring Ludacris | "OMG" | Usher Featuring will.i.am | "I'm in Love (I Wanna Do It)" | Alex Gaudino | |
| October 30 | "Get Outta My Way" | Kylie Minogue | "We No Speak Americano" | Yolanda Be Cool & Dcup | "Only Girl (In the World)" | Rihanna | |
| November 6 | "To Paris with Love" | Donna Summer | "We No Speak Americano" | Yolanda Be Cool & Dcup | "Only Girl (In the World)" | Rihanna | |
| November 13 | "Only Girl (In the World)" | Rihanna | "Stereo Love" | Edward Maya & Vika Jigulina | "I'm in Love (I Wanna Do It)" | Alex Gaudino | |
| November 20 | "Hands" | The Ting Tings | "Stereo Love" | Edward Maya & Vika Jigulina | "Take Over Control" | Afrojack featuring Eva Simons | |
| November 27 | "In for the Kill" | La Roux | "Stereo Love" | Edward Maya & Vika Jigulina | "Somewhere" | DJ Mog featuring Sarah Lynn | |
| December 4 | "Peacock" | Katy Perry | "Stereo Love" | Edward Maya & Vika Jigulina | "Raise Your Glass" | Pink | |
| December 11 | "I Like That" | Richard Vission and Static Revenger starring Luciana | "Stereo Love" | Edward Maya & Vika Jigulina | "Only Girl (In the World)" | Rihanna | |
| December 18 | "Barbra Streisand" | Duck Sauce | "Stereo Love" | Edward Maya & Vika Jigulina | "Take Over Control" | Afrojack featuring Eva Simons | |
| December 25 | "Loca" | Shakira featuring Dizzee Rascal | "Stereo Love" | Edward Maya & Vika Jigulina | "Raise Your Glass" | Pink | |

== See also ==
- 2010 in American music
- List of Billboard Hot 100 number ones of 2010
