= California Dreams Tour =

2011–2012 concert tour by Katy Perry

- World tour by Katy Perry
- Promotional poster for the tour
- Associated album: Teenage Dream
- Start date: February 20, 2011
- End date: January 22, 2012
- Legs: 8
- No. of shows: 124
- Supporting acts: DJ Skeet Skeet; Zowie; Robyn; Marina and the Diamonds; Janelle Monáe; Oh Land; Natalia Kills; Ellie Goulding
- Box office: $59.5 million ($82.74 million in 2025 dollars)

Katy Perry concert chronology
- Hello Katy Tour (2009); California Dreams Tour (2011–2012); Prismatic World Tour (2014–2015)

The California Dreams Tour was the second concert tour by American singer Katy Perry, in-support of her third studio album, Teenage Dream (2010). The tour played 124 shows, beginning February 20, 2011 in Lisbon, Portugal and concluding on January 22, 2012 in Pasay, Philippines. It visited Europe, Oceania, Asia and the Americas. The tour became an international success, with tickets selling out and ranking 16th in Pollstar's "2011 Top 25 Worldwide Tours", earning over $59.5 million from over 1 million tickets sold. At the end of 2011, Billboard ranked it #13 on its annual "Top 25 Tours", earning nearly $48.9 million. It won an award for Favorite Tour Headliner at the 38th People's Choice Awards.

== Background ==
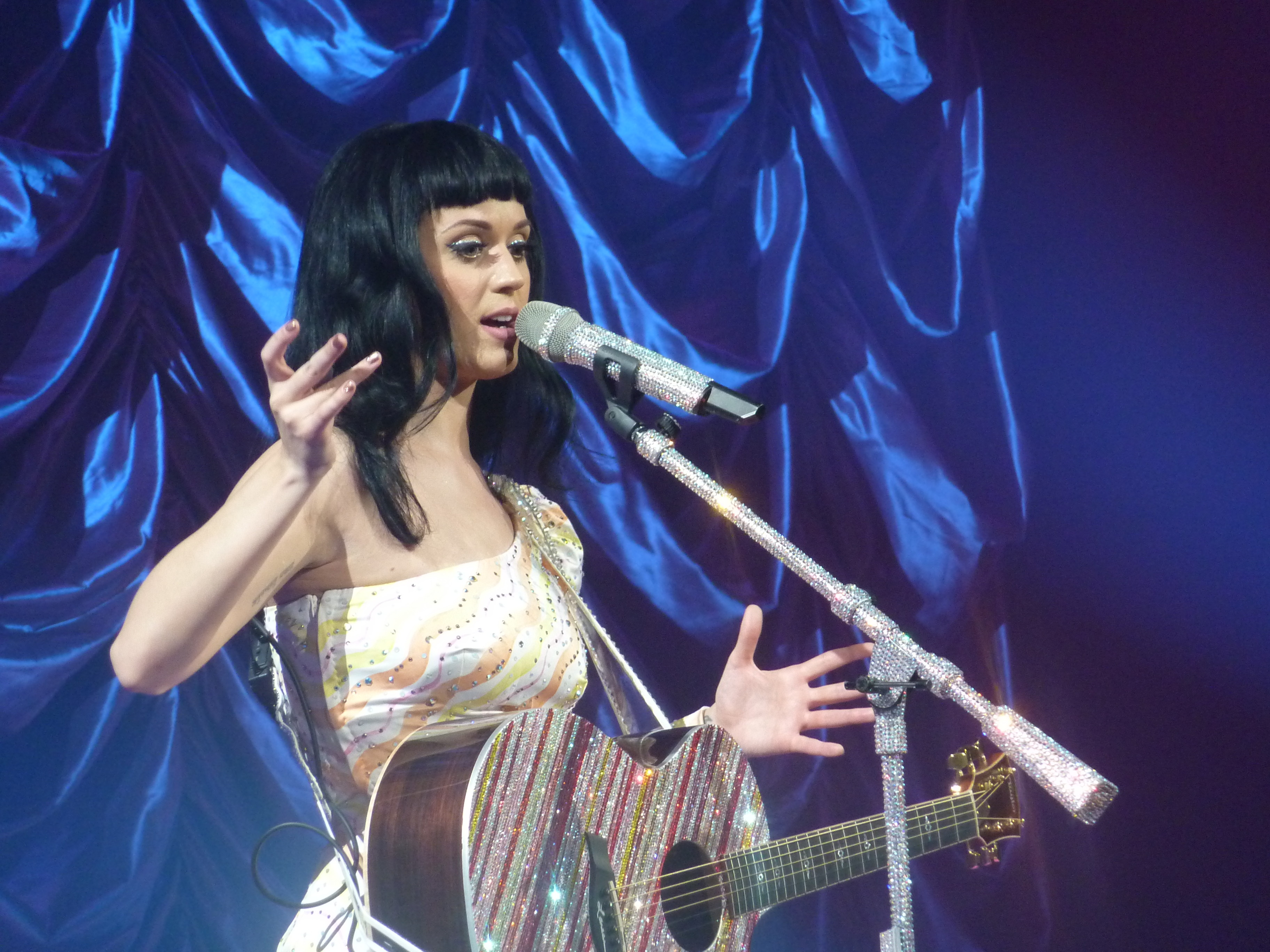
Perry performing "Thinking of You" at the Zénith de Paris in Paris in March 2011

In October 2010, Perry told MTV about the California Dreams Tour, saying "I guess I'm looking forward to making music videos on this new album..... and I'm really excited about incorporating the look and the idea of some of the songs on tour and making a massive production of it. I'm gonna want a lot of visuals. I want it to be 10 times better than when I was on tour last." Baz Halpin was hired to direct the tour and production on the tour began in November 2010. Perry chose Halpin as the director after seeing his work with Pink and wanted the tour to look like the work of artists Will Cotton and Mark Ryden. The show was originally conceived as a more intimate, theater-based production, with only one or two smaller indoor arena dates; however, as Perry's global popularity was rising, the tour was upgraded and revamped to accommodate significantly larger venues, capable of holding anywhere from 5,000 to nearly 30,000 spectators. With the tour's restyling came a larger, rolling stage, with more lighting and larger video screens, as well as more dramatic costume changes. Fourteen trucks were required to move the entire spectacle. Tour director Baz Halpin designed the show to be a "jukebox musical."

While promoting the Teenage Dream album, Perry expressed that she wanted her upcoming tour to be very visual, stating "I hope that it's going to engage all of your senses: sight, sound, smell, taste, touch". The tour was officially announced in October 2010 by several media outlets, including Perry's official website, in-conjunction with the release of her third single, "Firework". In 2011, Perry announced the North American tour during a Facebook Live chat. She stated that the tour would display "super girl power", with female artists, like Swedish pop star Robyn, Yelle, Marina Diamandis, and Janelle Monáe, as opening acts on various dates. Perry further stated she would actively participate with fans during the tour via social media, namely Facebook and Twitter.

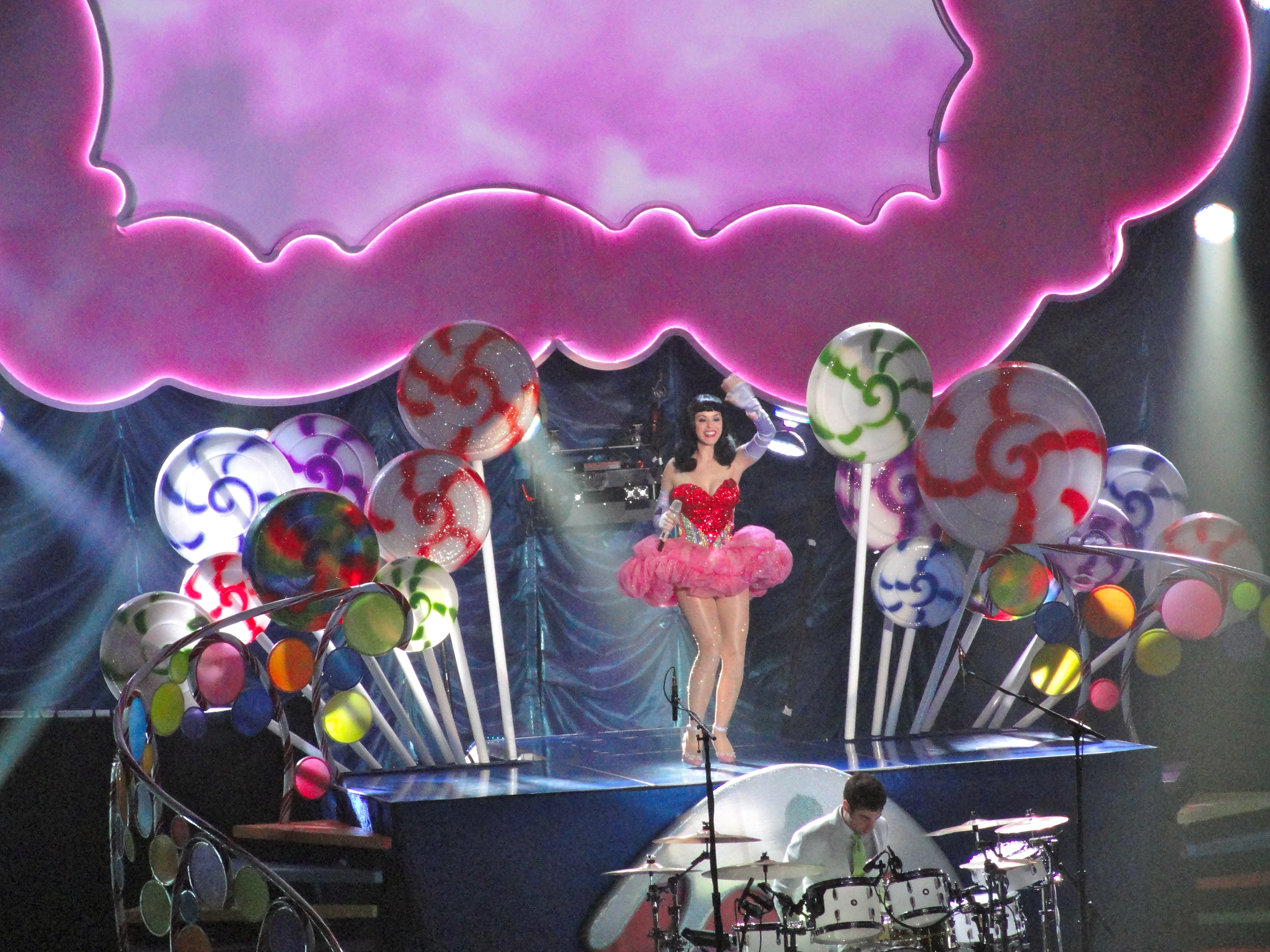
Perry opening the show

British singer Jessie J, a personal friend of Perry, was confirmed as a support act during the final autumnal leg of the tour, but was ordered by doctors to cancel after an injury during tour rehearsals; Perry was instead supported by fellow UK indietronica artist Ellie Goulding.

Calvin Harris was advertised as the opening act for Perry during the English, Scottish, Welsh, and Irish shows; on March 27, 2011, Perry announced, via Twitter, that Harris was "no longer involved" with the tour. Harris cited technical restrictions as the reason for his cancellation, and he was replaced by DJ Skeet Skeet.

While Perry was performing at the TSB Bank Arena in Wellington, New Zealand, on May 10, 2011, a 24-year-old female was injured in the floor section of the venue (in front of the stage), suffering a black eye along with small cuts and bruises. The woman later stated she was attacked by another female concert attendee, who had been standing in-front of her, when she was aggressively told to "stop pushing".

Perry announced on her website that over $150,000 was raised for the Tickets-For-Charity fundraiser, from which a portion of proceeds are donated to charity. The money was divided between three charities—the Children's Health Fund (CHF), Generosity Water, and the Humane Society of the United States. EMI donated a signed album by Perry to an auction for the Society for the Prevention of Cruelty to Animals (SPCA) of Auckland. The auction was for the promotion of several California Dreams Tour dates in New Zealand. The auction closed on May 31, 2011. In November, Perry announced a free show at Staples Center in Los Angeles, which was recorded for a tour DVD. The recordings were later used for her documentary film, Katy Perry: Part of Me.

== Concert synopsis ==
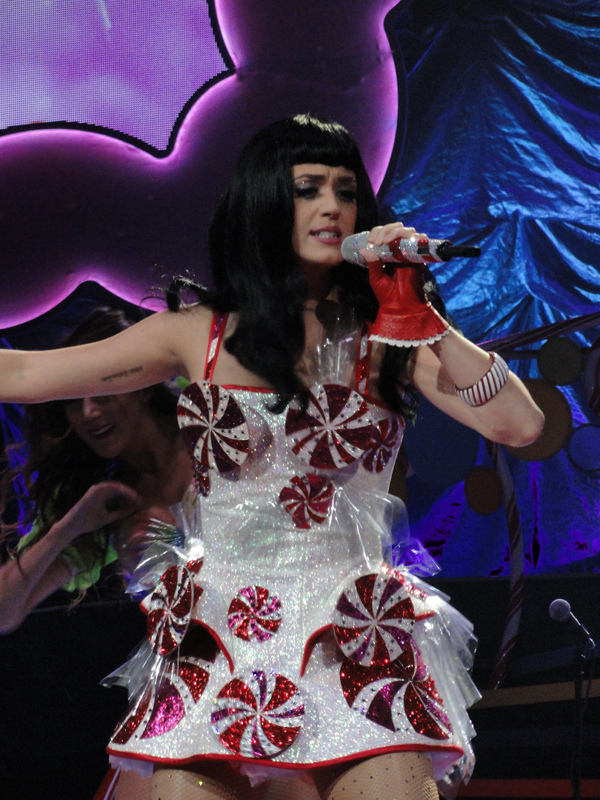
Perry performing live Guadalajara, Mexico

The show begins with a video screen introduction directed by Cole Walliser which tells the story of a girl named Katy who lives in a colorless world wasting her life cutting meat for a mean old butcher. One night, Perry escapes her dreadful reality by falling asleep and visits a vibrant candy land in search of her pet cat, Kitty Purry, and also for her love interest, the Baker's Boy, played by Nick Zano. Katy appears on stage and starts performing "Teenage Dream" with her dancers, while wearing a white dress with spinning peppermints. "Hummingbird Heartbeat" and "Waking Up in Vegas" are performed next, the latter accompanied by a human slot machine, showgirls and an Elvis Presley impersonator. She leaves the stage briefly for a costume change while a video interlude shows Perry taking a shortcut that leads her into a candy forest where she meets two naughty mimes who join her on stage to perform "Ur So Gay". At the end of the performance, Perry takes a bite of their magical brownie. Perry then makes a wardrobe change on stage, trading her skirt for a feathered tail while she begins to perform "Peacock", an elaborated feathered fan dance number. After that, she is covered by peacock tails held by her dancers, and makes a costume change on stage by removing her peacock tail and wears a colorful vampy torch-singer garb over her blue suit. Perry interacts with the audience and invites a male fan on stage to flirt and kiss, and then goes on to perform a slow version of "I Kissed a Girl" which shortly transforms into a rock version. Perry then exits the stage for a costume change while two female dancers keep dancing on stage until the song ends.

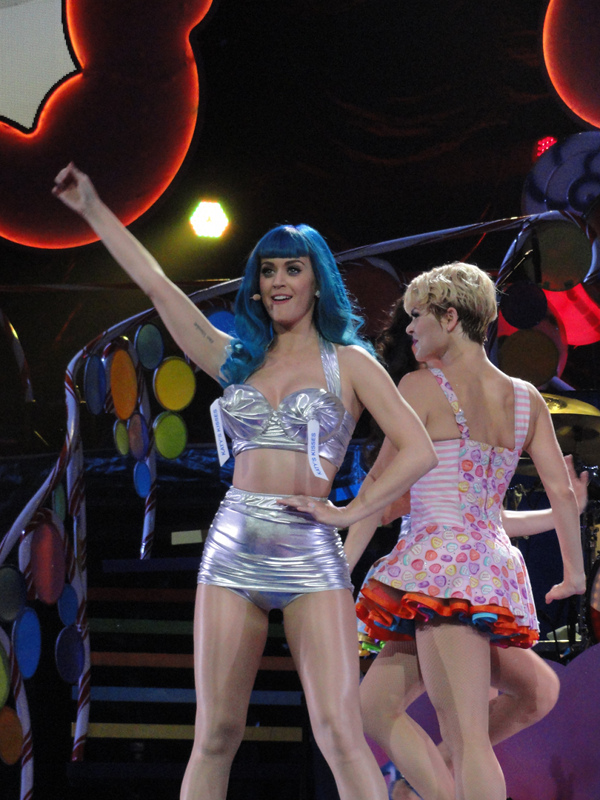
Perry closing the show with a performance of "California Gurls" at the KeyArena in Seattle on July 21, 2011

In the next section, a video interlude reveals that the mimes' brownie has transformed Perry into a catwoman, a plan executed by the evil butcher all along. "Circle the Drain" gets performed while Perry battles her dancers who are dressed as butchers before going into "E.T." where laser beams run across the stage while a futuristic lyrics video is projected on the screens. The show continues with "Who Am I Living For?" in which she was captivated by her dancers and strapped with elastic strings while being thrown back and forth and at the end of the performance is left on the ground defeated. She is then saved by her two backup singers who dress her in a sparkling dress and moves into "Pearl", at one moment she is lifted in the air sitting in the backs of two aerialists, while near the end Perry moves into the end of the catwalk on the stage where an area of the stage goes up in the air lifting her up. After a brief video interlude, Perry reappears on stage sitting on a swing to perform "Not Like the Movies". During the performance, Katy is lifted high above the stage as images of cartoons kissing are projected behind her. At the end of the number, Perry and her band move to the catwalk. Perry interacts with the audience, and introduces her band members, and picks her guitar to perform an acoustic version of "The One That Got Away", while in selected UK dates, Perry mashed the song with Adele's "Someone Like You". Then, she goes on to perform an acoustic medley of songs such as Rihanna's "Only Girl (In the World)", Jay Z's "Big Pimpin'", Willow Smith's "Whip My Hair", and Rebecca Black's "Friday" while interacting with the public. A giant pink colored cloud descends to the stage and Perry gets on top of it, she is then elevated above the crowd and performs "Thinking of You". When Perry exits the stage, the band and the dancers perform a medley of songs such as "I Want Candy", "Milkshake", "How Many Licks?", and "Tootsee Roll.

Another video interlude starts playing where Perry finally finds Kitty Purry and is now headed to the Big Bakers City Ball wearing a blue wig to meet her lover, the Baker's Boy. Trying to decide on what to wear, Perry starts performing "Hot n Cold", going through seven costume changes bursting immediately into "Last Friday Night (T.G.I.F.)". During this song, photos of fans are displayed on the screens. This is followed by a cover of Whitney Houston's "I Wanna Dance with Somebody", in which Perry and her cat Kitty Purry invite up to 20 fans onto the stage at the end of the number. After a high-energy and sparkly performance of "Firework" the encore begins with the final interlude of the show, which reveals that Perry has been dreaming all along, suddenly the Baker's Boy enters her room dressed in a gingerbread costume to deliver cupcakes she has ordered for breakfast. Perry returns to the stage for a performance of "California Gurls" dressed in a silver bra shaped like Hershey's Kisses, dancing with a line of Gingerbread men, and dousing the crowd with a whip cream bazooka. At the end, Perry and the dancers bow to the audience as the curtain falls down.

== Reception ==
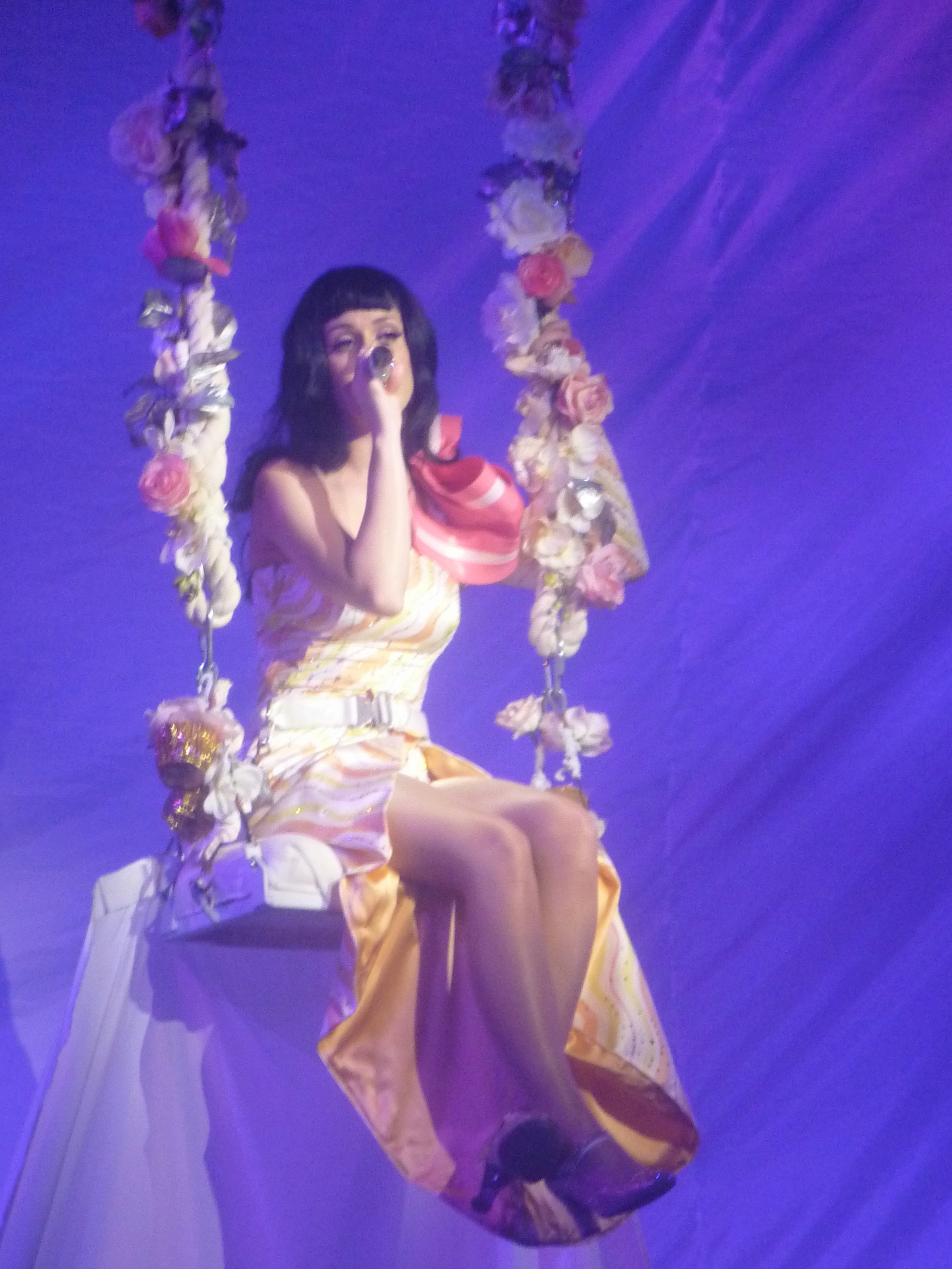
Perry at le Zénith de Paris

The tour received positive reviews from music critics. Bridget Jones from Stuff NZ gave it an excellent review. She said "There was no doubt her fans were left with a truly sweet taste in their mouths after one of the most extravagant and fun performances Vector Arena has seen in a long time". Bernadette McNulty from The Daily Telegraph gave it four out of five stars, complimenting storyline of the tour itself. She had noted "Her California Dreams tour is less of a pop concert and more of a megawatt jukebox musical." They had said that it features all the glitz and glamour, but said that the music lacks a few and it doesn't leave a trace to remember. Jon Mitchell from MTV reviewed the concert at Uniondale and said that "The show stuck so impressively to its storyline about Perry's travels through Candy Land in pursuit of "the baker's boy" that it could almost be a jukebox Broadway musical in the vein of "Rock of Ages" or "Mamma Mia."

Joseph Brannigan Lynch from Entertainment Weekly reviewed the tour through the night in New Jersey, which featured Robyn. He gave it a positive review, but said: "Say what you will about Katy Perry—sure, she has a weak singing voice and her songs are mostly devoid of substance—but as a courier of frothy delights and eye-catching effulgence, she's become one of today's most-satisfying pop stars." Metro.co.uk gave it a positive review. They had said, "The show had a sweet theme and Katy performed in a front of a candy cane staircase against a backdrop of giant lollipops in a characteristically outlandish outfit of glittery fishnet stockings, a sparkly heart-shaped corset and a bright pink tutu." John Mitchell from MTV News gave the concert a very positive review. He had said "It was colorful, triumphant and the perfect way to end a near-perfect pop show" and also added, "Unlike many of her dance-pop contemporaries (think Lady Gaga or Britney Spears), Perry left most of the dancing to her talented backup troupe, who were introduced individually during solos to popular candy-related songs." Emily Mackay from NME gave it a positive review.

=== Accolades ===
Year	Award	Result
2011	Billboard Touring Awards for Top Tour	13th
2011	Pollstar for Top 25 Worldwide Tours	16th
2011	Capricho Awards for Melhor Show	Nominated
2011	MTV Europe Music Awards for Best Live Act	Won
2011	Teen Choice Awards for Choice Music: Tour	Won
2012	People's Choice Awards for Favorite Tour Headliner	Won
2012	Parnelli Awards for Lighting Designer of the Year (Baz Halpin)	Won
2012	Parnelli Awards for Pyro Company of the Year (Strictly FX)	Won

== Broadcasts and recordings ==
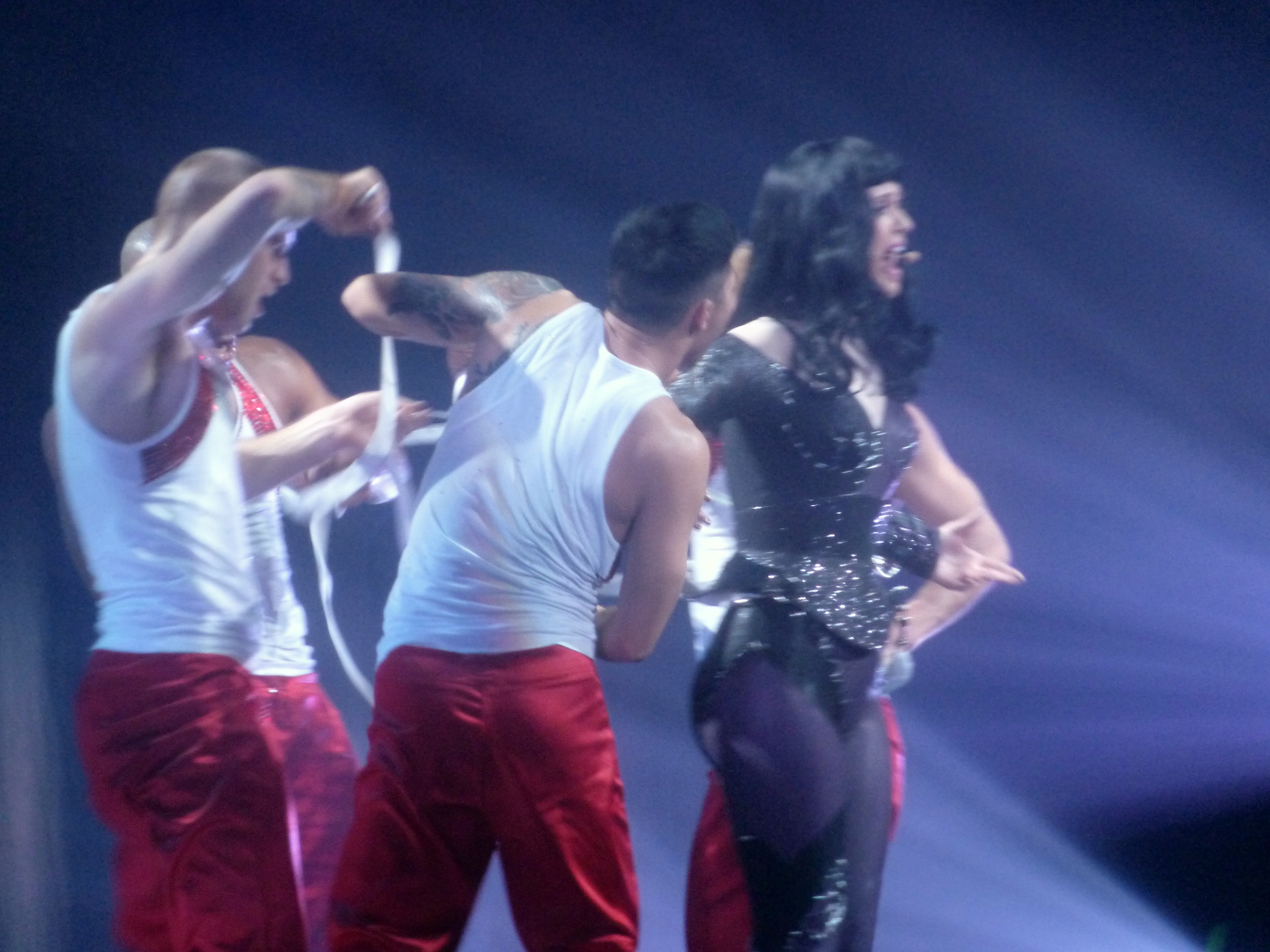
Perry performing "Who Am I Living For?" at the Zénith de Paris

Perry's performance at the Rock in Rio festival was broadcast live in Brazil on Multishow, Globo.com, and Rede Globo, and aired live, internationally, on YouTube. In March 2012, Perry announced, via Twitter, the release of her autobiographical documentary, Katy Perry: Part of Me, to be released on July 5, 2012 with Paramount Pictures. The "rockumentary" contains various behind-the-scenes interview clips and performances from the tour, with most being recorded in Los Angeles on November 23, 2011.

== Set list ==
This set list is from the show on June 15, 2011 in Columbia, Maryland. It is not intended to represent all concerts for the tour.

1. "Teenage Dream"
2. "Hummingbird Heartbeat"
3. "Waking Up in Vegas"
4. "Ur So Gay"
5. "Peacock"
6. "I Kissed a Girl"
7. "Circle the Drain"
8. "E.T."
9. "Who Am I Living For?"
10. "Pearl"
11. "Not Like the Movies"
12. "The One That Got Away"
13. "Only Girl (In the World)" / "Big Pimpin'" / "Friday" / "Whip My Hair"
14. "Thinking of You"
15. "Hot n Cold"
16. "Last Friday Night (T.G.I.F.)"
17. "I Wanna Dance with Somebody (Who Loves Me)"
18. "Firework"

Encore:

19. "California Gurls"

=== Notes ===
- "One of the Boys" was played instead of "Hummingbird Heartbeat" in the first night of the tour.
- "Friday" was not performed during the first European leg and Perry sang "Born This Way" instead at selected dates, such as in Paris, France.
- At selected dates of the second leg in Europe, Perry performed a mash-up of "The One That Got Away" and "Someone like You".
- On August 5, Rebecca Black joined Perry onstage to perform "Friday".

== Tour dates ==
List of 2011 concerts, showing date, city, country, venue, opening act, tickets sold, number of available tickets, and amount of gross revenue
Date	City	Country	Venue	Opening act	Attendance	Revenue
February 20, 2011	Lisbon	Portugal	Campo Pequeno	DJ Skeet Skeet	6,162 / 6,271	$283,541
February 23, 2011 (Note: The February 23, 2011 concert in Milan at Mediolanum Forum was originally scheduled to take place at PalaSharp, but was rescheduled due to high demand.)	Milan	Italy	Mediolanum Forum	DJ Skeet Skeet	11,218 / 11,218	$458,765
February 25, 2011	Zürich	Switzerland	Hallenstadion	DJ Skeet Skeet	5,111 / 5,111	$343,709
February 26, 2011	Munich	Germany	Zenith Munich	DJ Skeet Skeet	5,883 / 5,883	$227,176
February 27, 2011 (Note: The February 27, 2011 concert in Vienna at Wiener Stadthalle was originally scheduled to take place at Gasometer, but was rescheduled due to high demand.)	Vienna	Austria	Wiener Stadthalle	DJ Skeet Skeet	12,332 / 12,570	$700,273
March 4, 2011 (Note: The March 4, 2011 concert in Berlin at Max-Schmeling-Halle was originally scheduled to take place at Columbiahalle, but was rescheduled due to high demand.)	Berlin	Germany	Max-Schmeling-Halle	DJ Skeet Skeet	7,443 / 8,950	$331,308
March 6, 2011 (Note: The March 6, 2011 concert in Frankfurt at Jahrhunderthalle was originally scheduled to take place in Offenbach at Stadthalle Offenbach, but was rescheduled due to high demand.)	Frankfurt	Germany	Jahrhunderthalle	DJ Skeet Skeet	4,800 / 4,800	$201,365
March 7, 2011	Paris	France	Zénith Paris	DJ Skeet Skeet	12,149 / 12,149	$767,981
March 8, 2011	Paris	France	Zénith Paris	DJ Skeet Skeet	12,149 / 12,149	$767,981
March 10, 2011	Brussels	Belgium	Forest National	DJ Skeet Skeet	8,000 / 8,000	$378,028
March 11, 2011	Cologne	Germany	Palladium Köln	DJ Skeet Skeet	4,008 / 4,008	$177,640
March 14, 2011	Hamburg	Germany	Alsterdorfer Sporthalle	DJ Skeet Skeet	6,916 / 6,916	$269,295
March 15, 2011	Amsterdam	Netherlands	Heineken Music Hall	DJ Skeet Skeet	5,462 / 5,607	$259,120
March 17, 2011	London	England	Hammersmith Apollo	DJ Skeet Skeet	14,777 / 14,777	$593,333
March 18, 2011	London	England	Hammersmith Apollo	DJ Skeet Skeet	14,777 / 14,777	$593,333
March 19, 2011	London	England	Hammersmith Apollo	DJ Skeet Skeet	14,777 / 14,777	$593,333
March 21, 2011	Manchester	England	O_{2} Apollo Manchester	DJ Skeet Skeet	7,057 / 7,221	$258,929
March 22, 2011	Manchester	England	O_{2} Apollo Manchester	DJ Skeet Skeet	7,057 / 7,221	$258,929
March 27, 2011	Liverpool	England	Echo Arena Liverpool	DJ Skeet Skeet	11,052 / 11,052	$398,646
March 28, 2011	Dublin	Ireland	O_{2} Dublin	DJ Skeet Skeet	9,122 / 9,122	$413,390
March 30, 2011	Nottingham	England	Motorpoint Arena Nottingham	DJ Skeet Skeet	9,095 / 9,095	$327,291
March 31, 2011	Bournemouth	England	Windsor Hall	DJ Skeet Skeet	6,211 / 6,306	$223,635
April 1, 2011	Cardiff	Wales	Motorpoint Arena Cardiff	DJ Skeet Skeet	7,530 / 7,530	$272,067
April 3, 2011	Newcastle	England	Metro Radio Arena	DJ Skeet Skeet	11,304 / 11,304	$412,296
April 4, 2011	Birmingham	England	Genting Arena	DJ Skeet Skeet	14,999 / 14,999	$543,572
April 5, 2011	Glasgow	Scotland	SEC Centre Hall 4	DJ Skeet Skeet	5,460 / 5,460	$198,206
April 9, 2011	London	England	Wembley Arena	DJ Skeet Skeet	11,251 / 11,507	$466,903
April 28, 2011	Melbourne	Australia	Rod Laver Arena	Zowie	24,649 / 24,649	$2,228,150
April 29, 2011	Melbourne	Australia	Rod Laver Arena	Zowie	24,649 / 24,649	$2,228,150
May 2, 2011	Adelaide	Australia	Adelaide Entertainment Centre	Zowie	8,805 / 9,426	$803,497
May 4, 2011	Sydney	Australia	Sydney Entertainment Centre	Zowie	22,834 / 24,146 (Note: The score data is combined from the two shows held at the Sydney Entertainment Centre on May 4 and 14 respectively.)	$2,031,140
May 5, 2011	Brisbane	Australia	Brisbane Entertainment Centre	Zowie	23,910 / 27,144 (Note: The score data is combined from the two shows held at the Brisbane Entertainment Centre on May 5 and 15 respectively.)	$2,107,890
May 7, 2011	Auckland	New Zealand	Vector Arena	Zowie	22,905 / 23,938	$1,435,140
May 8, 2011	Auckland	New Zealand	Vector Arena	Zowie	22,905 / 23,938	$1,435,140
May 10, 2011	Wellington	New Zealand	TSB Bank Arena	Zowie	5,726 / 5,830	$381,959
May 13, 2011	Newcastle	Australia	Newcastle Entertainment Centre	Zowie; DJ Skeet Skeet	7,043 / 7,407	$706,342
May 14, 2011	Sydney	Australia	Sydney Entertainment Centre	Zowie		
May 15, 2011	Brisbane	Australia	Brisbane Entertainment Centre	Zowie		
May 22, 2011	Nagoya	Japan	Zepp Nagoya	—N/a	—N/a	—N/a
May 23, 2011	Tokyo	Japan	Studio Coast	—N/a	—N/a	—N/a
May 24, 2011	Tokyo	Japan	Studio Coast	—N/a	—N/a	—N/a
May 26, 2011	Osaka	Japan	Zepp Osaka	—N/a	—N/a	—N/a
June 7, 2011	Atlanta	United States	The Arena at Gwinnett Center	Robyn; DJ Skeet Skeet	10,341 / 10,341	$460,845
June 9, 2011	Orlando	United States	UCF Arena	Robyn; DJ Skeet Skeet	7,792 / 7,792	$350,640
June 10, 2011	Tampa	United States	St. Pete Times Forum	Robyn	10,558 / 10,558	$441,652
June 11, 2011	Sunrise	United States	BankAtlantic Center	Robyn	12,014 / 12,014	$488,685
June 14, 2011	Raleigh	United States	RBC Center	Robyn; DJ Skeet Skeet	10,352 / 10,352	$429,952
June 15, 2011	Columbia	United States	Merriweather Post Pavillion	Robyn; DJ Skeet Skeet	15,553 / 18,000	$538,879
June 17, 2011	Uniondale	United States	Nassau Coliseum	Robyn; DJ Skeet Skeet	12,358 / 12,615	$580,647
June 18, 2011	Boston	United States	TD Garden	Robyn; DJ Skeet Skeet	12,589 / 12,589	$577,977
June 19, 2011	Newark	United States	Prudential Center	Robyn; DJ Skeet Skeet	13,321 / 13,321	$580,198
June 23, 2011	Pittsburgh	United States	Petersen Events Center	Marina and the Diamonds; DJ Skeet Skeet	8,610 / 8,610	$387,450
June 24, 2011	Philadelphia	United States	Wells Fargo Center	Marina and the Diamonds; DJ Skeet Skeet	14,931 / 14,931	$631,978
June 25, 2011	Uncasville	United States	Mohegan Sun Arena	Marina and the Diamonds; DJ Skeet Skeet	5,323 / 5,323	$239,535
June 28, 2011	Auburn Hills	United States	The Palace of Auburn Hills	Marina and the Diamonds; DJ Skeet Skeet	14,144 / 14,144	$559,870
June 29, 2011	Toronto	Canada	Air Canada Centre	Marina and the Diamonds; DJ Skeet Skeet	28,794 / 28,794	$1,260,890
June 30, 2011	Toronto	Canada	Air Canada Centre	Marina and the Diamonds; DJ Skeet Skeet	28,794 / 28,794	$1,260,890
July 2, 2011	Montreal	Canada	Bell Centre	Marina and the Diamonds; DJ Skeet Skeet	12,906 / 12,906	$607,562
July 3, 2011	Ottawa	Canada	Scotiabank Place	Marina and the Diamonds; DJ Skeet Skeet	13,426 / 13,596	$620,394
July 5, 2011	Cleveland	United States	Quicken Loans Arena	Marina and the Diamonds; DJ Skeet Skeet	11,602 / 11,836	$413,850
July 7, 2011 (Note: The July 7, 2011 concert in Milwaukee, Wisconsin at the Marcus Amphitheater was a part of Summerfest 2011.)	Milwaukee	United States	Marcus Amphitheater	Marina and the Diamonds; DJ Skeet Skeet	20,417 / 20,764	$596,935
July 13, 2011	Regina	Canada	Brandt Centre	Janelle Monáe; DJ Skeet Skeet	6,296 / 6,466	$306,020
July 14, 2011	Winnipeg	Canada	MTS Centre	Janelle Monáe; DJ Skeet Skeet	11,405 / 11,695	$542,272
July 16, 2011 (Note: The July 16, 2011 in Calgary, ALberta at the Scotiabank Saddledome was a part of the Calgary Stampede.)	Calgary	Canada	Scotiabank Saddledome	Janelle Monáe; DJ Skeet Skeet	12,357 / 12,727	$719,219
July 17, 2011	Edmonton	Canada	Rexall Place	Janelle Monáe; DJ Skeet Skeet	13,701 / 13,750	$600,540
July 19, 2011	Vancouver	Canada	Rogers Arena	Janelle Monáe; DJ Skeet Skeet	13,359 / 13,906	$670,037
July 20, 2011	Seattle	United States	KeyArena	Robyn; DJ Skeet Skeet	12,294 / 12,609	$437,120
July 22, 2011	Portland	United States	Rose Garden	Robyn; DJ Skeet Skeet	10,259 / 11,059	$392,854
July 23, 2011	Boise	United States	Taco Bell Arena	Robyn; DJ Skeet Skeet	7,747 / 7,995	$310,440
July 25, 2011	Salt Lake City	United States	EnergySolutions Arena	Robyn; DJ Skeet Skeet	11,745 / 12,080	$432,840
July 26, 2011	Broomfield	United States	1stBank Center	Robyn; DJ Skeet Skeet	5,608 / 5,868	$259,602
July 28, 2011	Grand Prairie	United States	Verizon Theatre at Grand Prairie	Robyn; DJ Skeet Skeet	6,431 / 6,431	$289,395
July 29, 2011	Houston	United States	Toyota Center	Robyn; DJ Skeet Skeet	12,235 / 12,235	$511,777
July 30, 2011	Austin	United States	Frank Erwin Center	Robyn; DJ Skeet Skeet	8,429 / 8,429	$379,305
August 3, 2011	Phoenix	United States	Comerica Theatre	Robyn; DJ Skeet Skeet	4,741 / 4,925	$186,145
August 5, 2011	Los Angeles	United States	Nokia Theatre L.A. Live	Robyn; DJ Skeet Skeet	20,769 / 20,769	$745,534
August 6, 2011	Los Angeles	United States	Nokia Theatre L.A. Live	Robyn; DJ Skeet Skeet	20,769 / 20,769	$745,534
August 7, 2011	Los Angeles	United States	Nokia Theatre L.A. Live	Robyn; DJ Skeet Skeet	20,769 / 20,769	$745,534
August 9, 2011	San Diego	United States	Valley View Casino Center	Oh Land; DJ Skeet Skeet	10,306 / 10,306	$431,760
August 12, 2011	San Jose	United States	HP Pavilion	Oh Land; DJ Skeet Skeet	12,373 / 12,660	$500,445
August 13, 2011	Santa Barbara	United States	Santa Barbara Bowl	Oh Land	9,698 / 9,698	$382,012
August 14, 2011	Santa Barbara	United States	Santa Barbara Bowl	Oh Land	9,698 / 9,698	$382,012
August 17, 2011	Kansas City	United States	Sprint Center	Janelle Monáe	12,995 / 12,995	$469,625
August 19, 2011	Nashville	United States	Bridgestone Arena	Janelle Monáe; DJ Skeet Skeet	12,122 / 12,122	$500,567
August 20, 2011	St. Louis	United States	Scottrade Center	Janelle Monáe; DJ Skeet Skeet	12,005 / 12,005	$497,910
August 21, 2011 (Note: The August 21, 2011 concert in Rosemont, Illinois at the Allstate Arena was originally scheduled to take place on July 8, but was postponed due to Perry having food poisoning.)	Rosemont	United States	Allstate Arena	Natalia Kills	13,617 / 13,617	$482,205
August 23, 2011 (Note: The August 23, 2011 concert in St. Paul, Minnesota at the Xcel Energy Center was originally scheduled to take place on July 9, but was postponed due to Perry having food poisoning.)	St. Paul	United States	Xcel Energy Center	Natalia Kills	14,402 / 14,402	$476,819
September 1, 2011	Zapopan	Mexico	Telmex Auditorium	Natalia Kills; DJ Skeet Skeet	8,451 / 8,578	$598,316
September 3, 2011	Mexico City	Mexico	Palacio de los Deportes	Natalia Kills; DJ Skeet Skeet	16,869 / 16,884	$707,031
September 5, 2011	Monterrey	Mexico	Arena Monterrey	Natalia Kills; DJ Skeet Skeet	9,944 / 9,958	$633,530
September 7, 2011	San Antonio	United States	AT&T Center	Janelle Monáe; DJ Skeet Skeet	9,733 / 10,165	$398,565
September 8, 2011	New Orleans	United States	New Orleans Arena	Janelle Monáe; DJ Skeet Skeet	11,496 / 11,496	$474,350
September 10, 2011	Louisville	United States	KFC Yum! Center	Janelle Monáe; DJ Skeet Skeet	13,555 / 13,555	$599,319
September 13, 2011	Columbus	United States	Nationwide Arena	Janelle Monáe; DJ Skeet Skeet	—N/a	—N/a
September 14, 2011	Indianapolis	United States	Conseco Fieldhouse	Janelle Monáe; DJ Skeet Skeet	9,693 / 10,360	$408,062
September 16, 2011	Omaha	United States	CenturyLink Center Omaha	Janelle Monáe; DJ Skeet Skeet	9,967 / 13,440	$438,735
September 17, 2011	Tulsa	United States	BOK Center	Janelle Monáe; DJ Skeet Skeet	12,475 / 12,475	$519,442
September 23, 2011 (Note: The September 23, 2011 concert in Rio de Janeiro, Brazil at the City of Rock was a part of Rock in Rio V festival.)	Rio de Janeiro	Brazil	Parque dos Atletas	—N/a	—N/a	—N/a
September 25, 2011	São Paulo	Brazil	Chácara do Jóquei	DJ Skeet Skeet	25,784 / 25,784	$2,705,710
September 27, 2011 (Note: The September 27, 2011 concert in Buenos Aires, Argentina at the Estadio G.E.B.A. was a part of the Pepsi Music Festival.)	Buenos Aires	Argentina	Estadio G.E.B.A.	DJ Skeet Skeet	—N/a	—N/a
October 12, 2011	Sheffield	England	Motorpoint Arena Sheffield	Oh Land; DJ Skeet Skeet	12,650 / 12,650	$543,527
October 14, 2011	London	England	The O_{2} Arena	Oh Land; DJ Skeet Skeet	31,250 / 31,708	$1,474,670
October 15, 2011	London	England	The O_{2} Arena	Oh Land; DJ Skeet Skeet	31,250 / 31,708	$1,474,670
October 18, 2011	Liverpool	England	Echo Arena Liverpool	Oh Land; DJ Skeet Skeet	—N/a	—N/a
October 19, 2011	Cardiff	Wales	Motorpoint Arena Cardiff	Oh Land; DJ Skeet Skeet	—N/a	—N/a
October 24, 2011	Belfast	Northern Ireland	Odyssey Arena	Oh Land; DJ Skeet Skeet	9,932 / 9,932	$493,104
October 26, 2011	Birmingham	England	National Indoor Arena	Oh Land; DJ Skeet Skeet	13,581 / 13,581	$597,314
October 27, 2011	Newcastle	England	Metro Radio Arena	Oh Land; DJ Skeet Skeet	—N/a	—N/a
October 29, 2011	Aberdeen	Scotland	Press & Journal Arena	Oh Land; DJ Skeet Skeet	—N/a	—N/a
October 31, 2011	Manchester	England	Manchester Evening News Arena	Oh Land; DJ Skeet Skeet	15,429 / 15,429	$679,914
November 1, 2011	Glasgow	Scotland	SEC Centre Hall 4	Oh Land; DJ Skeet Skeet	—N/a	—N/a
November 3, 2011	Glasgow	Scotland	SEC Centre Hall 4	Oh Land; DJ Skeet Skeet	—N/a	—N/a
November 4, 2011	Glasgow	Scotland	SEC Centre Hall 4	Oh Land; DJ Skeet Skeet	—N/a	—N/a
November 5, 2011	Nottingham	England	Capital FM Arena Nottingham	Oh Land; DJ Skeet Skeet	—N/a	—N/a
November 7, 2011	Dublin	Ireland	The O_{2}	Oh Land; DJ Skeet Skeet	18,250 / 18,250	$935,460
November 8, 2011	Dublin	Ireland	The O_{2}	Oh Land; DJ Skeet Skeet	18,250 / 18,250	$935,460
November 15, 2011	Hartford	United States	XL Center	Ellie Goulding	9,998 / 10,500	$401,772
November 16, 2011	New York City	United States	Madison Square Garden	Ellie Goulding	—N/a	—N/a
November 19, 2011	Las Vegas	United States	Mandalay Bay Events Center	Ellie Goulding	—N/a	—N/a
November 21, 2011	Oakland	United States	Oracle Arena	Ellie Goulding	12,303 / 12,303	$554,075
November 22, 2011	Los Angeles	United States	Staples Center	Ellie Goulding	13,332 / 13,332	$569,016
November 23, 2011 (Note: The November 23, 2011 concert in Los Angeles at Staples Center was a free concert as a thank you from Perry to her fans.)	Los Angeles	United States	Staples Center	Ellie Goulding	—N/a	—N/a

List of 2012 concerts, showing date, city, country, venue, opening act, tickets sold, number of available tickets, and amount of gross revenue
Date	City	Country	Venue	Opening act	Attendance	Revenue
January 19, 2012	Bogor	Indonesia	Sentul Auditorium	—N/a	—N/a	—N/a
January 22, 2012	Manila	Philippines	SM Mall of Asia Concert Grounds	—N/a	—N/a	—N/a
Total					1,069,921 / 1,090,011 (98.15%)	$52,125,081

== Cancelled shows ==
List of cancelled concerts, showing date, city, country, venue and reason for cancellation
Date	City	Country	Venue	Reason
December 1, 2011	Charlotte	United States	Spectrum Center	Unforeseen circumstances and scheduling conflicts
January 1, 2012	Corpus Christi	United States	American Bank Center Arena	Unforeseen circumstances and scheduling conflicts

== Personnel ==
=== Main ===
- Show Director — Baz Halpin
- Production & Lighting Design — Baz Halpin & Chris Nyfield
- Production Manager — Jay Schmit
- Programming — Baz Halpin & Bryan Barancik
- Lighting Director — Brad Teagan
- Lighting Crew Chief — John Chiodo
- Lighting Crew — Mat Hamilton, Andy Cimerman, Wayne Kwiat, & Daniel Kirkman
- Video Director — Richy Parkin
- Video Producer — Olivier Goulet
- Video Technical Director — Olivier Goulet
- Video Projectionist — Jason Lowe
- Video Tech — Gordon Davis
- Tour Manager — Fitzroy Hellin
- Stage Manager — Aaron Draude
- Event Manager — Jordan Ford
- General Management — Meghan Brown
- Riggers — Chuck Melton & John Williamson
- Pyro — Phil Maggs
- Lighting Company — Upstaging Inc.
- Video Company — Chaos Visual Productions
- Set Construction — ShowFX Inc.
- Staging Company — All Access Staging & Productions
- Lasers — Laser Design Productions
- Photography — Baz Halpin & Todd Kaplan
- Fashion Stylist — Meghan Brown
- Dancers — Leah Adler, Lockhart Brownlie, Anthony Burrell, Lexie Contursi, Ashley Ashida Dixon, Brandee Evans, Bryan Gaw, Malik LeNost, Rachael Markarian, Scott Myrick, Cassidy Noblett, Anne Stenberg, & Darine Stenberg

=== Band ===
- Lead vocals & guitar — Katy Perry
- Background vocals — Lauren Allison Ball & Tasha Layton
- Musical director & drums — Adam Marcello
- Guitars — Casey Hooper & Patrick Matera
- Keyboards — Max Hart
- Bass — Joshua Moreau
