= The Radio (Get Far song) =

"The Radio (featuring H-Boogie)"

Single by Get Far
- Released: 17 May 2010
- Recorded: 2009
- Genre: Electronic dance, progressive house
- Length: 3:30
- Label: Island Records (UK); Robbins Entertainment (US)
- Songwriters: G. Faletti, A. Branduardi, S. De Paola, H. Swaray
- Producer: M. Fargetta

Get Far singles chronology
"Shining Star" (2007)	"The Radio (featuring H-Boogie)" (2010)	"Free" (2010)

"The Radio" is a song by Italian electronica/dance DJ Mario Fargetta under the guise of Get Far, with vocals by British singer/rapper H-Boogie. The single was released in May 2010 and reached number one on the Billboard Hot Dance Airplay chart in August 2010. It also reached number one in the Czech Republic and peaked at number 4 in Slovakia. The song borrows quotes from "Il Giocatore Di Biliardo" by Branduardi.

== Track listing ==
The Radio (UK CD)

- The Radio (Radio Edit)
- The Radio (Extended Mix)
- The Radio (Instrumental Dub)
- The Radio (Simon From Deep Divas Remix)
- The Radio (Rendered Mix)
- The Radio (Paolo Ortelli Vs. Degree Remix)
- The Radio (Molella Edit)
- The Radio (Molella Remix)
- The Radio (Alex Gaudino & Jason Remix)
- The Radio (DJ Ross & Alessandro Mix)
- The Radio (DJ Ross & Alessandro Edit)

== Chart positions ==
Chart (2010)	Peak position
Czech Republic Airplay (ČNS IFPI)	1
Slovakia Airplay (ČNS IFPI)	4
US Billboard Hot Dance Airplay	1

== See also ==
- List of number-one dance airplay hits of 2010 (U.S.)
