= Hammer to the Heart (The Tamperer featuring Maya song) =

2000 single by the Tamperer featuring Maya

- Italian 12-inch single artwork

Single by the Tamperer featuring Maya
- B-side: "Step Out"
- Released: 31 January 2000
- Studio: Dreamhouse (London, England)
- Length: 3:30 (F.A.F. radio edit)
- Label: TIME
- Songwriters: Bill Lawrie; Paul Barry; Mark Taylor; Panman & Ace 45; Kinane
- Producer: Metro

The Tamperer featuring Maya singles chronology
"If You Buy This Record (Your Life Will Be Better)" (1998)	"Hammer to the Heart" (2000)	"Feel It 2009" (2009)

Music video
- "Hammer to the Heart" on YouTube

"Hammer to the Heart" is the third single released by Italian dance music group the Tamperer featuring Maya. The track samples the synthesizer riff from Swedish pop group ABBA's 1979 song "Gimme! Gimme! Gimme! (A Man After Midnight)". "Hammer to the Heart" was released on 31 January 2000 as the group's first standalone single and their last release until the 2009 remix of their 1998 hit, "Feel It". The song became the group's third top-10 single in the United Kingdom, reaching number six on the UK Singles Chart, and entered the top 30 in Ireland and Sweden, peaking at number 23 in both nations.

== Critical reception ==
British music website Popjustice praised "Hammer to the Heart", labelling it as "amazing" and referring to it as a mashup between two then unmade tracks: "Hung Up" by Madonna (2005) and "Something Kinda Ooooh" by Girls Aloud (2006). The publication also praised the use of crowd noise and bells in the instrumentation.

== Chart performance ==
Released on 31 January 2000, the single began to appear on national music charts in early February. In the United Kingdom, it debuted and peaked at number six on the UK Singles Chart on 6 February 2000, going on to spend a total of 10 nonconsecutive weeks in the top 100. It was the group's third and final top-10 hit in the UK. In Ireland, it spent three weeks on the Irish Singles Chart, settling at a peak of number 23.

On 10 February, "Hammer to the Heart" debuted at number 41 on the Swedish Singles Chart and ascended to its highest position of number 23 two weeks later. The song first appeared on the Belgian and Dutch singles charts on the same day, 12 February; in the former country, it debuted at its peak, number 45, while in the Netherlands, it rose to number 88 during its second of three weeks in the top 100. On the Eurochart Hot 100, "Hammer to the Heart" debuted and peaked at number 29. The song also found moderate success in Australia, where it reached number 67.

== Track listings ==
Italian 12-inch single

A1. "Hammer to the Heart" (Metro extended mix) – 5:30
A2. "Hammer to the Heart" (Metro 7-inch mix) – 3:18
B1. "Hammer to the Heart" (Pure Energy extended mix) – 5:02
B2. "Step Out" – 3:05

European CD single

1. "Hammer to the Heart" (F.A.F. radio edit) – 3:30
2. "Hammer to the Heart" (Metro radio edit) – 3:08

UK CD single

1. "Hammer to the Heart" (F.A.F. radio edit) – 3:30
2. "Hammer to the Heart" (Dynamic remix) – 4:38
3. "Step Out" – 3:05

UK cassette single

1. "Hammer to the Heart" (F.A.F. radio edit) – 3:30
2. "Step Out" – 3:05

Australian maxi-CD single

1. "Hammer to the Heart" (F.A.F. radio edit)
2. "Hammer to the Heart" (Metro radio edit)
3. "Hammer to the Heart" (Dynamic remix)
4. "Hammer to the Heart" (Firewall vocal remix)
5. "Hammer to the Heart" (DJ Fergie remix)
6. "Step Out"

== Charts ==
=== Weekly charts ===
Weekly chart performance for "Hammer to the Heart"
Chart (2000)	Peak position
Australia (ARIA)	67
Belgium (Ultratop 50 Flanders)	45
Europe (Eurochart Hot 100)	29
Ireland (IRMA)	23
Netherlands (Single Top 100)	88
Scotland Singles (OCC)	6
Sweden (Sverigetopplistan)	23
UK Singles (OCC)	6
UK Indie (OCC)	2

=== Year-end charts ===
Year-end chart performance for "Hammer to the Heart"
Chart (2000)	Position
Europe Border Breakers (Music & Media)	95
UK Singles (OCC)	186
