= Peacock (song) =

- Remixes cover

Promotional single by Katy Perry

from the album Teenage Dream
- Released: March 26, 2012
- Studio: Roc the Mic Studios (New York City, New York)
- Genre: Dance-pop
- Length: 3:51
- Label: Capitol
- Songwriters: Katy Perry; Mikkel S. Eriksen; Tor Erik Hermansen; Ester Dean
- Producer: Stargate

"Peacock" is a song by American singer Katy Perry, taken from her third studio album, Teenage Dream (2010). The song was written by Perry alongside Ester Dean and Stargate, the latter group also producing the song. Because the dance-pop song was filled with suggestive lyrics pertaining to male genitalia, Capitol Records initially opposed the idea of including it on her record. Similar to what happened with another song of hers – "I Kissed a Girl" (2008) – she refused to withdraw it from the record. The song was initially released as a Radio Promotional Single with focusing on the Billboard Dance Club Songs on September 6, 2010. On March 26, 2012, a remix version by Cory Enemy and Mia Moretti was later released as a promotional single on iTunes.

"Peacock" was panned by music critics and, musically, was compared to the 1980s song "Mickey" by Toni Basil, and Gwen Stefani's "Hollaback Girl" (2005). The song charted at number 52 in the Czech Republic, number 56 in Canada, number 101 in South Korea, number 152 in the United Kingdom, and number 1 on the US Dance Club Songs chart. It has also received platinum certifications in Australia, Canada, and the United States. Perry has performed "Peacock" on several occasions, including during her 2011 world tour California Dreams Tour. When performing the track, the singer usually wears colorful or glittery clothing.

== Production ==
Mikkel S. Eriksen, Tor Erik Hermansen, and Ester Dean assisted Perry in writing "Peacock" for her third studio album, Teenage Dream, released in 2010. According to Perry, the whole point of writing "Peacock" was to play with words. Midway through recording the album, Perry recalled saying to the people she was working with: "Look I've got a lot of jewels, but I really don't have the crown. I really don't have that full-blown presentation". So she then decided to get back into the studio and work with Stargate, a production team co-producing Teenage Dream, during a late-night session and made several more songs, including "Firework" and "Peacock".

Originally, the singer's recording label, Capitol Records, was against the inclusion of the song as a track on Teenage Dream as they deemed "Peacock" too controversial. "They were all a bit worried about the word 'cock' and it gave me déjà vu because they did the exact same thing with 'I Kissed a Girl,'" Perry stated. Unhappy with the idea of making her music more family friendly, she insisted on including the songs the label objected to. "They said, 'We don't see it as a single, we don't want it on the album.' And I was like, 'You guys are idiots'." When asked about "Peacock", Perry stated: "I'm hoping it will be a gay-pride anthem, peacocks represent a lot of individuality..... It's not just like, 'I wanna see your bulge.'" And then she went on to clarify: "It does have the word cock in it, but art is also in fart! It's all in how you look at it." Prior to the release of Teenage Dream, the singer debuted "Peacock" in early August 2010 when she performed it at the MTV World Stage in Malaysia.

== Composition ==
"Peacock" (2010)
A 23-second sample of the song's hook, where Perry sings "I wanna see your peacock-cock-cock" repeatedly.

"Peacock" is a dance-pop song, with an up-tempo house music beat, that lasts for three minutes and 51 seconds. Sheet music for the song was in the key of D minor in a time signature of 4/4 with a tempo of 138 beats per minute. Perry's vocal range spans over an octave, from B♭_{3} to D_{5}. Lyrically, the track contains a double entendre with suggestive wording. New York magazine writer Willa Paskin observed that Perry did the obvious with the song's hook ("she used a common word for penis and made it mean penis!"). Paskin also wrote that "Peacock" could perhaps be the most outrageous example of an entirely obvious double entendre. Perry herself has considered it to be the biggest innuendo in the world. During an interview with MTV News, the singer said that she is a fan of using puns and double entendres and often looks for ways to incorporate it into her material. In the song, Perry repeatedly asks to see their peacock, if they are "brave enough" to do so. Its composition was compared to Toni Basil's cheerleader anthem "Mickey" by many reviews as both songs are stomping jams, bursting with double meanings. Leah Greenblatt of Entertainment Weekly dubbed it a shamelessly silly revival of Basil's 1980s track. Rob Sheffield from Rolling Stone noticed the two songs shared a drum hook, and thought of "Peacock" as a sequel to Gwen Stefani's 2005 single, "Hollaback Girl".

== Critical reception ==
The track garnered generally negative reviews and criticism from journalists, who mostly criticized the song's "cock, cock, cock" line. Greg Kot from the Chicago Tribune said that "Peacock" adapting the beat from Basil's "Mickey" into a suggestive metaphor "barely qualifies as an off-color joke let alone a song." Stephen Thomas Erlewine from AllMusic found the singer to have distinguished herself through "desperate vulgarity". Erlewine concluded: "All this stylized provocation is exhausting, and not just because there's so much of it (none of it actually arousing). It's tiring because, at her heart, Perry is old-fashioned and is invested in none of her aggressive teasing."

Elysa Gardner from USA Today advised people who buy the album to skip the song. In his negative review for the album, Matthew Cole of Slant Magazine found it difficult to think of a song more unrefined or more irritating than "Peacock". He believed all reviews of Teenage Dream will discuss the track, which will be because it is "potentially historic in its badness, to the point that, once you've heard it, you too will have to describe it to other people just to convince yourself that it really exists." Spin magazine writer Mikael Wood remarked that the song contains a double entendre that even a performer such as Kesha could find crude.

Writing in music website Sputnikmusic, Rudy Klapper said she would bet that "Peacock" would "never [be] seeing the light of day, primarily because it's a terrible song with a double entendre so blunt it would make Ke$ha blush". Klapper also said the lyrics do not complement Perry's writing skills. The Washington Post staff writer Chris Richards' review of the track was also negative. Talking about how hooks on Teenage Dream are catchy, but quickly start to erode if listeners pay more attention to the words, he cited "Peacock" as an example of this. Describing its chorus as "an earworm of the highest order," he said some of the lyrics are enough to make people clench their teeth.

== Chart performance ==
Despite not being released as a main single, "Peacock" as a Promotional Single managed to chart in some territories. The song peaked at number fifty-six on the Canadian Hot 100 and performed similarly in the Czech Republic, where it charted at number fifty-two. The UK Singles Chart was where "Peacock" had its lowest charting entry. In the week ending on September 11, 2010, the track found its peak at number one-hundred-twenty-five. On Billboard's US Dance Club Songs, where it was the main focus, the song had its highest peak position. After eight weeks of appearing on the chart, "Peacock" reached the top spot, replacing La Roux's "In for the Kill", on December 4, 2010. However, by next week, it was superseded by the Richard Vission song "I Like That". The song also reached number five on the Billboard Bubbling Under Hot 100 Singles chart. In June 2014, the song was certified Platinum by the RIAA for selling one million copies.

== Live performances and cover versions ==
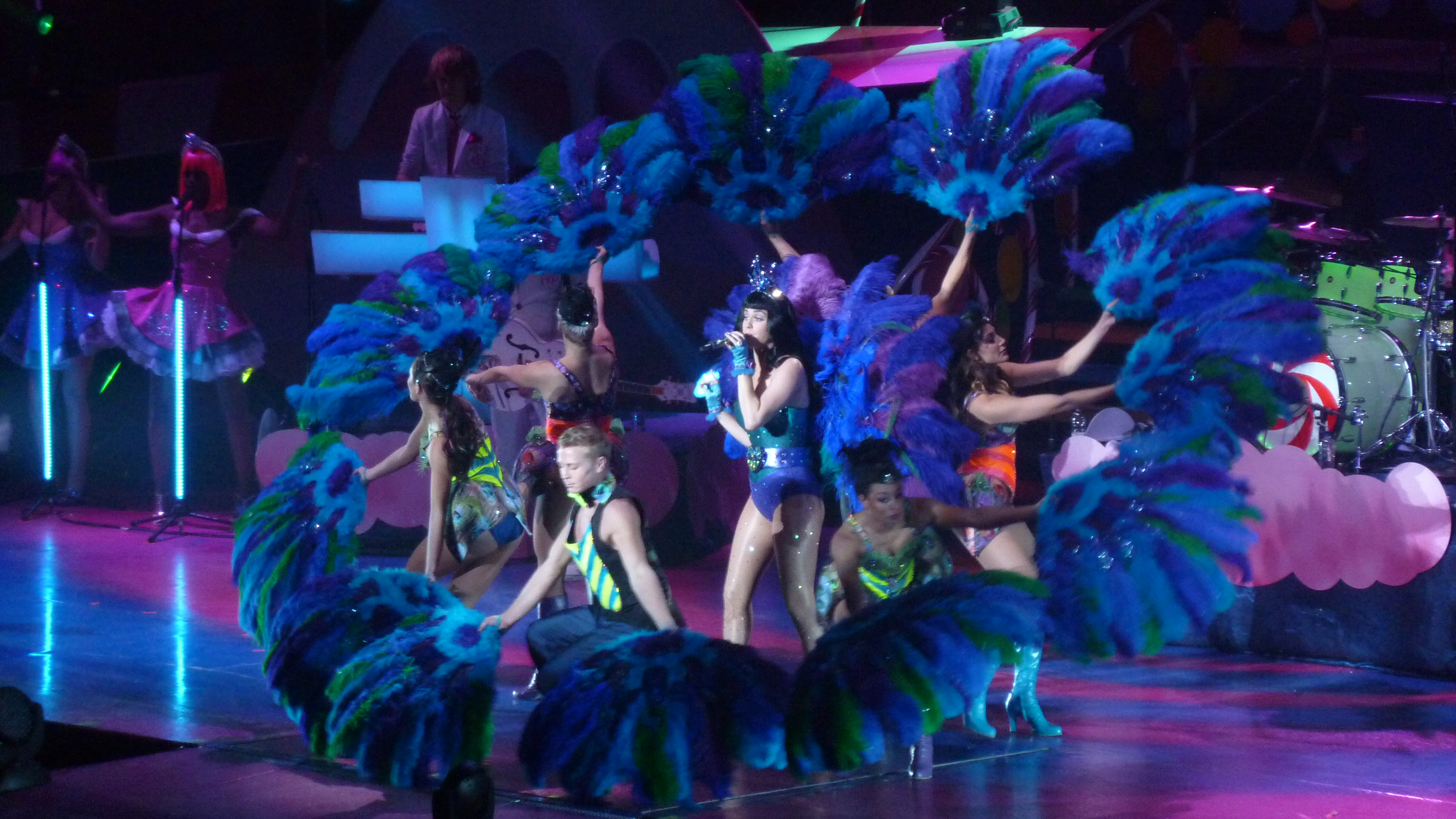
Perry performing "Peacock" in Dublin

For most performances of "Peacock", the singer usually dons a glittery aquamarine bustier or a colorful piece of clothing attached to her back that is to resemble peacock feathers. Perry's first performance of the song took place during August 2010 at the MTV World Stage. The stage she performed on included props such as lifesize candy canes, background dancers dressed up like candy canes and a video of a blue eye surrounded by peacock feathers playing in the backdrop. While dancing across the stage, Perry wore a white glitter unitard and tutu.

In November, Perry also performed "Peacock" at New York's Roseland Ballroom, where she introduced herself by popping out of a giant cake, dressed in a purple skin-tight cupcake print dress. Additionally, Perry included "Peacock" in her setlist for her worldwide concert tour, California Dreams Tour (February 2011 – January 2012). When singing the song, the performance would include an elaborated feathered fan dance number. She wore a turquoise/green one-piece swimsuit with a peacock tail attached accompanied by female dancers dressed in a similar way, two male dancers and mimes. Concert reviewer Jim Abbott for the Orlando Sentinel felt that detailed performances such as the ones done for "Peacock" were a highlight for the singer's tour.

Monthly LGBT-interest magazine The Advocate called "Peacock" "very gay". Ryan James Yezak, who had already parodied another of Perry's songs, "California Gurls", did the same for "Peacock". While fewer than James Yezak's parody of the former, his "Peacock" video received more than 130,000 reviews on the internet just two days after its release.

The song was included on the 2016 film, How to Be Single.

== Track listing ==
Digital download – Cory Enemy & Mia Moretti Remix

1. "Peacock" (Cory Enemy & Mia Moretti Remix) – 5:32

== Credits and personnel ==
Credits adapted from the Teenage Dream liner notes.

- Assistant: Tim Robbins
- Mixers: Serban Ghenea
- Mix engineer: John Hanes
- Producers: Stargate
- Recorders: Mikkel S. Eriksen, Miles Walker
- Backing vocals, Lead vocals: Katy Perry
- Writers: Katy Perry, Mikkel S. Eriksen, Tor Erik Hermansen, Ester Dean

== Charts ==
Chart (2010)	Peak position
Canada (Canadian Hot 100)	56
Czech Republic (IFPI)	52
South Korea (Gaon International Chart)	101
UK Singles (Official Charts Company)	125
US Bubbling Under Hot 100 (Billboard)	5
US Dance Club Songs (Billboard)	1

== Certifications ==
Certifications for "Peacock"
Region	Certification	Certified units/sales
Australia (ARIA)	Platinum	70,000^{‡}
Brazil (Pro-Música Brasil)	Gold	30,000^{‡}
Canada (Music Canada)	Platinum	80,000^{‡}
United States (RIAA)	Platinum	1,000,000^{‡}
^{‡} Sales+streaming figures based on certification alone.

== See also ==
- List of Billboard number-one dance songs of 2010
