= The Tamperer featuring Maya =

Italian dance music band

- Origin: Italy
- Genre: Italo dance
- Years active: 1998–present
- Labels: Pepper Records; Jive/BMG Records
- Members: Fargetta; Alex Farolfi; Danielle Barnett
- Past members: Maya Days

The Tamperer featuring Maya is an Italian dance music group consisting of Italian record producers Mario Fargetta and Alex Farolfi. The group initially featured American singer Maya Days. Later, Giuliano Saglia and GianLuca Mensi would join the project. They achieved European success in 1998 with "Feel It", which reached number-one in both the United Kingdom and Ireland. The Tamperer remains active and since 2024 has been performing with singer Danielle Barnett, former lead vocalist of 1990s dance group Urban Cookie Collective.

== Overview ==
In 1998, the group achieved huge success with their debut single "Feel It", which peaked at number two in Italy and topped the charts in Belgium (Wallonia), Ireland and the United Kingdom. The song is from the album Fabulous, and was written by the American team of Steve Gittelman and Jim Dyke. It heavily samples the Jacksons hit "Can You Feel It".

The album spawned two more singles, "If You Buy This Record (Your Life Will Be Better)" (based on a sample from Madonna's "Material Girl"), which peaked at number four in Italy and also peaked within the top ten of the charts in Denmark, Finland, Ireland and the United Kingdom, and the Italy-only release "Step Out". The group returned in early 2000 to release its next (and final) single, "Hammer to the Heart" (based on ABBA's "Gimme! Gimme! Gimme! (A Man After Midnight)"). "Hammer to the Heart" became the group's third single to peak within the top ten of the charts in the United Kingdom at number six.

The producers also used the Tamperer alias to produce for and remix other artists, such as Crystal Waters.

== Discography ==
=== Albums ===
Title	Album details	Peak chart positions	
Title	Album details	AUS	NZ
Fabulous	Released: January 1999; Label: BMG	180	46

=== Singles ===
Year	Title	Peak chart positions											Certifications	Album
Year	Title	ITA	AUS	BEL	FIN	FRA	GER	IRE	NED	NZ	SWE	UK	Certifications	Album
1998	"Feel It"	3	19	3	7	5	31	1	10	10	20	1	ARIA: Gold; BEA: Platinum; BPI: Platinum; RMNZ: Gold; SNEP: Silver	Fabulous
1998	"If You Buy This Record (Your Life Will Be Better)"	4	37	20	9	60	74	6	18	11	23	3	BPI: Silver	Fabulous
1999	"Hammer to the Heart"	33	67	45	—	—	—	23	88	—	23	6		Non-album singles
2009	"Feel It 2009"	—	—	—	—	—	—	—	97	—	—	—		Non-album singles
"—" denotes items that did not chart or were not released in that territory.
