= Somewhere (DJ Mog & Sarah Lynn song) =

Single by DJ Mog featuring Sarah Lynn
- Genre: Electronic dance music
- Label: Nervous Records.
- Songwriter(s): DJ Mog, Sarah Lynn, Mark Le Sal

"Somewhere" is a song by Northern Irish electronic musician DJ Mog, released in 2010 on Nervous Records. Singer-songwriter Sarah Lynn provided vocals on the track as well as co-wrote it. The pair have performed the song live in support of other acts such as Fatboy Slim, during the artist's visits to Belfast.

After first receiving popularity on UK-related music channels such as BBC Radio 1 and Cool FM, label Nervous Records stated that it sought to promote the track in the US. The single received commercial success in the U.S., reaching the No. 1 spot on Billboard's Hot Dance Airplay chart. The song spent eighteen weeks on the chart in total.

== DJ Mog background ==
Referred to by the BBC Radio 1 Judge Jules program as an "Irish up & comer", he began playing electronic dance music in local events in his hometown of Belfast during the early 1990s. He entered and won a few local DJing competitions before taking more interest into the studio and production side of things.

== Sarah Lynn background ==
One of a pair of identical twins, Lynn grew up in the Killinchy area but later moved to Belfast. Though strongly interested in music, particularly listening to songs by Radiohead and Foo Fighters, she has stated that struggles with clinical depression and related afflictions such as bipolar disorder have dogged her for years. Though Lynn felt forced to drop out of her degree course in textile art at the University of Ulster School of Art, she took up singing, writing songs, and playing guitar as well as working as a volunteer for charity events. She has remarked, "I take lithium which makes my mood more consistent. It does away with the peaks and troughs but it also leaves a bit of emotional numbness." She has also stated that the "last thing I want is for my condition to be a barrier that keeps me back" and she feels optimistic given the popularity of the "Somewhere" single.

== Album releases ==
A version of the track was included in the compilation album The New Dance Mix USA: In the Club alongside other dance-oriented releases such as "Sofi Needs a Ladder" by Deadmau5 and "Barbra Streisand" by Duck Sauce. Mixed by artist Ted the Dillinger, the album was released on 15 March 2011. Praised in an AllMusic review as a "diverse set of populist dance music", the album reached the No. 8 spot on Billboard's Top Electronic Albums chart and No. 19 on the Top Heatseekers chart.

== See also ==
- List of number-one dance airplay hits of 2010 (U.S.)
- Nervous Records
