= Feel It (The Tamperer featuring Maya song) =

1998 single by the Tamperer featuring Maya

Single by the Tamperer featuring Maya

from the album Fabulous
- Released: 9 April 1998
- Studio: E-Mail (Italy)
- Genre: Italo house; dance
- Length: 5:01 (original version); 3:02 (radio edit); 3:15 (Blunt edit)
- Label: TIME
- Songwriters: Michael Jackson; Jackie Jackson; Steve Gittelman; Jim Dyke
- Producer: Falox

The Tamperer featuring Maya singles chronology
| "Feel It" (1998) | "If You Buy This Record (Your Life Will Be Better)" (1998) |

Audio
- "Feel It" on YouTube

"Feel It" is a song by Italian musical group the Tamperer featuring Maya, released by various labels as the first single from their only album, Fabulous (1999). Produced by Falox, a production team that then consisted of Tamperer members Mario Fargetta and Alex Farolfi, the song is based on the Jacksons' 1981 hit "Can You Feel It" and quotes Heather Leigh West's lyrics from Urban Discharge's 1996 song "Wanna Drop a House."

The song was a commercial success, reaching number one in the United Kingdom, Ireland, and the Wallonia region of Belgium. It also topped the Canadian RPM Dance chart, peaked at number two in Italy, and reached the top 10 in eight other countries, including France, Hungary, New Zealand, and Norway.

== Background and release ==
Producer Alex Farolfi went to Ibiza in the summer of 1997 and noticed that the crowd would go wild when a club DJ played "Can You Feel It". Mario Fargetta and Farolfi went together and made a version using a sample of the original by The Jacksons and tested it in Italian clubs. The track was so successful that the producers decided to re-record it properly. "Feel It" was released in May 1998 as the lead single from the group's debut album, Fabulous. Club remixes from British DJ-producer Sharp and Dirty Rotten Scoundrels caught the attention of DJ Pete Tong, who featured a different remix each Friday night for six weeks on his Essential Selection dance music show on CHR network BBC Radio 1 in the United Kingdom.

== Critical reception ==
Scottish Daily Record praised the song as "brilliant". Pan-European magazine Music & Media commented, "This Italian production team consists of three producers from national CHR network Radio Deejay. DJ Fargetta, Alex Farolfi and Mentiroso use the talents of dance diva Maya as the icing on the cake, which has the Jacksons' 'Can You Feel It' as its main ingredient." They also complimented it as a "incredibly catchy track". Music Week wrote that it "may lack credibility, but it's irritatingly catchy." Music Week editor Alan Jones noted that "it includes none of the original lyrics [from 'Can You Feel It'], however relying instead on a vocal from Maya about infidelity, with lyrics like "you made your bed and she was in it" and, more bizarrely, "What's she gonna look like with a chimney on her."

Chris Finan from the Record Mirror Dance Update gave "Feel It" three out of five, writing, "A bit of a love-it-or-hate-it one here. Pepper's first release sees a female vocal run over The Jacksons' 'Can You Feel It' in as blatant a manner as possible. There are three mixes with little variation, relying on the said sample to do the damage. It's easy to see how the mainstream clubs are going to lap this up, and with apt radio support it could result in lots of copies going over the counter." In 2025, Classic Pop magazine ranked it number seven in their list of "Top 20 No.1s That Owed a Debt to the 80s".

== Chart performance ==
"Feel It" was successful globally and remains the group's biggest hit. In Europe, it peaked at number one in Ireland, the United Kingdom, and the Wallonia region of Belgium. In the UK, it peaked during its sixth week on the UK Singles Chart, on 24 May 1998. It also topped the UK Indie Chart, which tracks singles from independent record labels. The single made it to the top 10 also in Denmark, Finland, Flanders, France, Greece, Hungary, Italy, the Netherlands, and Norway, as well as on the Eurochart Hot 100, where it rose to number two. It was a top-20 hit in Austria, Iceland, and Sweden and a top-40 hit in Germany and Switzerland. Outside Europe, "Feel It" reached number one on the RPM Dance chart in Canada, number four on the Billboard Dance Club Play chart in the United States, number 10 in New Zealand, and number 19 in Australia. The single earned a gold record in Australia, France, and New Zealand while earning a platinum record in Belgium and the UK.

== Music video ==
A witty music video was produced for "Feel It", directed by director Daniel P. Siegler & Tracks. It features singer Maya with three musicians with identical sunglasses and outfits in a room with red furnitures and curtains. In between, a story is being told of two women who arrive at a wharf in their car. They are going on a boat trip. Onboard they have drinks and flirt with the captain. Towards the end, the ladies go ashore with the captain by the arm. Then a man appears in an open car. Apparently it is the captain's lover. As the car with the two men drives off into the sunset, the two ladies faint from shock.

== Track listings ==
- Italian 12-inch single

A1. "Feel It" (original version) – 5:01
B1. "Feel It" (radio version) – 3:02
B2. "Feel It" (mail version) – 3:50

- US 12-inch single

A1. "Feel It" (Sharp Masterblaster remix) – 8:21
A2. "Feel It" (radio version) – 3:15
AA1. "Feel It" (Dirty Rotten Scoundrels Voyeurism Vocal remix) – 6:06
AA2. "Feel It" (Sharp Masterblaster instrumental) – 8:18

- UK 12-inch single

A1. "Feel It" (original version) – 5:05
A2. "Feel in the House" – 5:30
B1. "Feel It" (Sharp Master Blaster remix) – 8:21
B2. "Feel It" (Dirty Rotten Scoundrels Voyeurism Vocal remix) – 6:05

- UK and European CD single
1. "Feel It" (Blunt Edit) – 3:15
2. "Feel It" (original mix) – 8:21
3. "Feel It" (Sharp Master Blaster remix) – 6:05
4. "Feel in the House" – 5:30
- European maxi-CD single
1. "Feel It" (radio edit) – 2:27
2. "Feel It" (original version) – 5:05
3. "Feel in the House" (extended mix) – 5:30

== Credits and personnel ==
Credits are adapted from the US and European maxi-single liner notes.

Studios

- Recorded at E-Mail Studio (Italy)
- Mastered at Frankfort/Wayne Mastering Labs Inc. (New York City)

Personnel

- Michael Jackson – writing
- Jackie Jackson – writing
- Steve Gittelman – writing
- Jim Dyke – writing
- Maya – vocals
- Falox – production
- Rick Essig – mastering

== Charts ==
=== Weekly charts ===
1998–1999 weekly chart performance for "Feel It"
| Chart (1998–1999) | Peak position |
|---|---|
| Australia (ARIA) | 19 |
| Austria (Ö3 Austria Top 40) | 18 |
| Belgium (Ultratop 50 Flanders) | 3 |
| Belgium (Ultratop 50 Wallonia) | 1 |
| Canada Dance/Urban (RPM) | 1 |
| Denmark (IFPI) | 3 |
| Europe (Eurochart Hot 100) | 2 |
| Finland (Suomen virallinen lista) | 7 |
| France (SNEP) | 5 |
| Germany (GfK) | 31 |
| Greece (IFPI) | 4 |
| Hungary (Mahasz) | 2 |
| Iceland (Íslenski Listinn Topp 40) | 12 |
| Ireland (IRMA) | 1 |
| Italy (Musica e dischi) | 2 |
| Netherlands (Dutch Top 40) | 7 |
| Netherlands (Single Top 100) | 10 |
| New Zealand (Recorded Music NZ) | 10 |
| Norway (VG-lista) | 5 |
| Scottish Singles Sales (Official Charts) | 1 |
| Sweden (Sverigetopplistan) | 20 |
| Switzerland (Schweizer Hitparade) | 33 |
| UK Singles (Official Charts) | 1 |
| UK Dance (Official Charts) | 4 |
| UK Dance Airplay (Media Control UK) | 1 |
| UK Independent (Official Charts) | 1 |
| US Bubbling Under Hot 100 Singles (Billboard) | 3 |
| US Dance Club Play (Billboard) | 4 |
| US Maxi-Singles Sales (Billboard) | 32 |

2009 weekly chart performance for "Feel It"
| Chart (2009) | Peak position |
|---|---|
| Netherlands (Single Top 100) | 97 |

=== Year-end charts ===
Year-end chart performance for "Feel It"
| Chart (1998) | Position |
|---|---|
| Australia (ARIA) | 82 |
| Belgium (Ultratop 50 Flanders) | 28 |
| Belgium (Ultratop 50 Wallonia) | 21 |
| Canada Dance/Urban (RPM) | 32 |
| Europe (Eurochart Hot 100) | 23 |
| Europe Border Breakers (Music & Media) | 4 |
| France (SNEP) | 42 |
| Iceland (Íslenski Listinn Topp 40) | 96 |
| Italy (Musica e dischi) | 3 |
| Netherlands (Dutch Top 40) | 71 |
| Netherlands (Single Top 100) | 81 |
| New Zealand (RIANZ) | 37 |
| UK Singles (OCC) | 19 |
| US Dance Club Play (Billboard) | 32 |

== Certifications ==
Certifications for "Feel It"
| Region | Certification | Certified units/sales |
|---|---|---|
| Australia (ARIA) | Gold | 35,000^{^} |
| Belgium (BRMA) | Platinum | 50,000^{*} |
| France (SNEP) | Gold | 250,000^{*} |
| New Zealand (RMNZ) | Gold | 5,000^{*} |
| United Kingdom (BPI) | Platinum | 600,000^{‡} |
^{*} Sales figures based on certification alone.^{^} Shipments figures based on certification alone.^{‡} Sales+streaming figures based on certification alone.

== Release history ==
Release dates and formats for "Feel It"
| Region | Date | Format(s) | Label(s) | Ref. |
|---|---|---|---|---|
| Europe | 9 April 1998 | CD | Orbit; Jive | |
| United Kingdom | 13 April 1998 | 12-inch vinyl; CD; cassette | Pepper | |
