= If You Buy This Record (Your Life Will Be Better) =

1998 single by the Tamperer featuring Maya

Single by the Tamperer featuring Maya

from the album Fabulous
- Released: 2 November 1998
- Studio: Evento Musica, E-Mail (Italy)
- Length: 4:30 (original version); 3:29 (radio edit)
- Label: TIME
- Songwriters: Steve Gittelman; Jim Dyke; Laura Dias; Peter Brown; Robert Rans
- Producer: Falox

The Tamperer featuring Maya singles chronology
"Feel It" (1998)	"If You Buy This Record (Your Life Will Be Better)" (1998)	"Hammer to the Heart" (1999)

"If You Buy This Record (Your Life Will Be Better)" (also titled without the parentheses) is a song by Italian music group the Tamperer featuring Maya. The song samples American singer Madonna's 1985 hit "Material Girl", which was the first time she allowed another artist to sample her music. It was released in Europe on 2 November 1998 and reached number three on the UK Singles Chart six days later. It also peaked within the top 10 in Denmark, Finland, Ireland and Italy. In the United States and Canada, the single was issued in 1999, becoming a dance hit in both countries.

== Critical reception ==
Upon the release, Larry Flick from Billboard magazine wrote that "as clever as peanut butter and chocolate, this full-on camp follow-up to (...) 'Feel It' rewrites the instrumental hook of Madonna's 'Material Girl' and wraps it around a super-catchy lyrical chant about how "f-f-f-f-f-f-f-fabulous" you'll be with this little ditty in hand." He noted further that "you can't deny its truth, given the adhesive sing-along verses about the improvements in life that Miss Days has seen since buying herself a piece of this musical carnival. The beat also hammers home with the potency of a massive facial tick, delivering the signature bass rollick that has ignited this group across much of Europe." He also stated that their only complaint is that "at 3:08, it's just too short", and added "take it to the beach, in the car, and impress your roommates with this care-free romp that couldn't deliver the season's fun quotient with any more good cheer."

British trade paper Music Week named "If You Buy This Record" its "Single of the Week" on their 17 October 1998 issue. Despite calling the track "cheesier than a bucket of fondue", the paper described the "Material Girl" sample as "irresistibly infectious" and referred to its title as "one of the cheekiest claims ever made". In 2025, Classic Pop magazine ranked it number 10 in their list of "Top 20 80s Sampling Hits".

== Chart performance ==
In the Tamperer's native Italy, the track peaked at number four on the Musica e dischi chart. In the United Kingdom, the single entered and peaked at number three on the UK Singles Chart on 8 November 1998, topping the UK Indie Chart the same week. It earned a silver certification in the UK for shipping over 200,000 units and ended 1998 as Britain's 59th-best-selling hit. In neighbouring Ireland, it reached number six on the Irish Singles Chart, while across Europe, it peaked inside the top 20 in Austria, Flanders, Denmark, Finland, the Netherlands, and Sweden. On the Eurochart Hot 100, it rose to number eight on 28 November 1998.

In New Zealand, "If You Buy This Record" peaked at number 11 on the RIANZ Singles Chart for two nonconsecutive weeks in February 1999, staying in the top 20 for 10 weeks and the top 50 for 16 weeks. In Australia, it repeatedly entered and exited the top 50 of the ARIA Singles Chart in early 1999, peaking at number 37 on 17 January 1999. The song was also successful on the American and Canadian dance charts, peaking in popularity in May 1999. In the former country, it reached number 15 on the Billboard Dance Club Play chart and number 16 on the Billboard Maxi-Singles Sales listing. On Canada's RPM Dance chart, the song peaked at number four on the issue of 3 May 1999.

== Track listings ==
- Italian 12-inch single

A1. "If You Buy This Record (Your Life Will Be Better)" (original version) – 4:30
A2. "If You Buy This Record (Your Life Will Be Better)" (airplay mix) – 3:30
B1. "If You Buy" (extended mix) – 5:00

- UK 12-inch single

A1. "If You Buy This Record Your Life Will Be Better" (Sharp Blasted Master remix) – 8:40
A2. "If You Buy This Record Your Life Will Be Better" (Dope Smugglaz remix) – 6:27
B1. "Feel It" (Klubbheads Klubb mix) – 7:29

- UK CD single
1. "If You Buy This Record Your Life Will Be Better" (radio edit) – 3:29
2. "If You Buy This Record Your Life Will Be Better" (Sharp Blasted Master remix edit) – 6:20
3. "If You Buy This Record Your Life Will Be Better" (Dope Smugglaz remix) – 6:27
- UK cassette single and European CD single
1. "If You Buy This Record Your Life Will Be Better" (radio edit) – 3:29
2. "If You Buy This Record Your Life Will Be Better" (extended mix) – 5:00
- European CD single – cardboard sleeve
1. "If You Buy This Record Your Life Will Be Better" (radio edit) – 3:30
2. "If You Buy This Record Your Life Will Be Better" (Sharp Blasted Master remix edit) – 6:14
- Australian maxi-CD
1. "If You Buy This Record (Your Life Will Be Better)" (radio edit) – 3:29
2. "If You Buy This Record (Your Life Will Be Better)" (Sharp Blasted Master remix edit) – 6:20
3. "If You Buy This Record (Your Life Will Be Better)" (Dope Smugglaz remix) – 6:27
4. "If You Buy This Record (Your Life Will Be Better)" (extended mix) – 5:00
5. "Feel It" (Blunt Edit) – 3:15
- US 12-inch single

A1. "If You Buy This Record Your Life Will Be Better" (Thunderpuss 2000 club mix) – 7:58
A2. "If You Buy This Record Your Life Will Be Better" (original extended) – 4:45
A3. "If You Buy This Record Your Life Will Be Better" (Thunderpuss Beats) – 3:25
B1. "If You Buy This Record Your Life Will Be Better" (Ralphi's 12-inch vocal) – 8:12
B2. "If You Buy This Record Your Life Will Be Better" (Thunderpuss 2000 dub instrumental) – 6:49

- US maxi-CD single
1. "If You Buy This Record Your Life Will Be Better" (radio mix) – 3:08
2. "If You Buy Fabulous" (Thunderpuss 2000 club mix) – 7:58
3. "If You Buy This Record Your Life Will Be Better" (original extended) – 4:47
4. "If You Buy Fabulous" (Thunderpuss Beats) – 3:25
5. "If You Buy Fabulous" (Ralphi's 12-inch vocal) – 8:12
6. "If You Buy Fabulous" (Thunderpuss 2000 dub instrumental) – 6:49

== Credits and personnel ==
Credits are adapted from the European CD single liner notes.

Studio

- Recorded at Evento Musica and E-Mail Studio (Italy)

Personnel

- Steve Gittelman – writing, vocal production
- Jim Dyke – writing, vocal production
- Laura Dias – writing
- Peter Brown – writing ("Material Girl")
- Robert Rans – writer of "Material Girl"
- Falox – production
- Giuliano Saglia – executive production
- Giacomo Maiolini – executive production
- Graziano Fanelli – recording (Evento Musica)
- Gianluca Mensi – recording (E-Mail Studio)

== Charts ==
=== Weekly charts ===
Weekly chart performance for "If You Buy This Record (Your Life Will Be Better)"
Chart (1998–1999)	Peak position
Australia (ARIA)	37
Austria (Ö3 Austria Top 40)	18
Belgium (Ultratop 50 Flanders)	20
Belgium (Ultratop 50 Wallonia)	29
Canada Dance/Urban (RPM)	4
Denmark (IFPI)	8
Europe (Eurochart Hot 100)	8
Finland (Suomen virallinen lista)	9
France (SNEP)	60
Germany (GfK)	74
Iceland (Íslenski Listinn Topp 40)	33
Ireland (IRMA)	6
Italy (Musica e dischi)	4
Italy Airplay (Music & Media)	3
Netherlands (Dutch Top 40)	15
Netherlands (Single Top 100)	18
New Zealand (Recorded Music NZ)	11
Scottish Singles Sales (Official Charts)	2
Sweden (Sverigetopplistan)	20
UK Singles (Official Charts)	3
UK Indie (Official Charts)	1
US Dance Club Play (Billboard)	15
US Maxi-Singles Sales (Billboard)	16

=== Year-end charts ===
1998 year-end chart performance for "If You Buy This Record (Your Life Will Be Better)"
Chart (1998)	Position
Europe Border Breakers (Music & Media)	41
UK Singles (OCC)	59

1999 year-end chart performance for "If You Buy This Record (Your Life Will Be Better)"
Chart (1999)	Position
Europe Border Breakers (Music & Media)	32
Italy (Musica e dischi)	90

== Certifications ==
Certifications for "If You Buy This Record (Your Life Will Be Better)"
Region	Certification	Certified units/sales
United Kingdom (BPI)	Silver	200,000^{^}
^{^} Shipments figures based on certification alone.
