= DJ Mog =

Northern Irish house DJ and producer (born 1984)

- Born: 17 January 1984 (age 41); Belfast, Northern Ireland
- Genres: House
- Occupation(s): DJ, producer, remixer, label owner
- Labels: Ego Records
- Website: www.djmog.com

DJ Mog is a Northern Irish house music DJ and producer, known for the single "Somewhere" (featuring singer Sarah Lynn) which reached No. 1 on the U.S. Billboard Hot Dance Airplay chart.

== Career ==
=== Early career ===
Taking up DJing at the early age of nine, DJ Mog started out his career playing at local under age events in his hometown of Belfast. After entering and winning many local DJ competitions he was quickly spotted by one of Northern Ireland's most established DJs and Producers, Micky Modelle

It was Modelle who convinced Mog at that time to spend more time in the studio than behind the turntables. Mog & Modelle later went on to become well known studio partners and produced under a number of aliases including: Funkaholicz, The Columbians, Tuff Twins and the Blitz Kidz. They also remixed for major record labels such as AATW and top artists such as Tina Turner, Nomad, Major Players and Hard House Queen, Rachel Auburn. The most well known of their productions was their local club hit "Tribal Satisfaction" which gave Mog his first taste of radio play and earned him a residency at Northern Ireland's most famous superclub, The Met Arena.

=== 2004–2006 ===
In 2004 Mog was crowned Northern Ireland Mixing Champion and began making his mark on the Irish club circuit.

In 2005 Mog set up his own recording studio, Hairy Lemon Studios and began producing under an array of aliases including: Space Hustlers, Krowd Killerz & Tatoe & Tease.

In 2006 Mog's bootleg of "Mr. Brightside" by The Killers was crowned Tried & Tested record of the week by Judge Jules on BBC Radio 1 show. The bootleg also went on to be named One for the Weekend by BBC Radio 1 and was played on air by all the Radio 1 jocks from Pete Tong to Vernon Kay.

As a DJ he took residency at the popular nightclub, Clubland in Cookstown & played main stage for the first time at Northern Ireland's biggest dance music festival, Planet Love. A stage he shared with superstar DJs and PAs that included Paul van Dyk, Chicane, Happy Mondays, Judge Jules, Eddie Halliwell and Mauro Picotto. 2006 also saw Mog travel abroad for the first time as a DJ to play at Majorca's most famous nightclub, BCM.

=== 2007–2009 ===
In 2007 MTV Dance broadcast live from Mog's residency at Clubland in Cookstown and he made his first appearance on BBC Radio 1 as a special guest on Dance Anthems with Dave Pearce. He was also nominated for Best Live Performance alongside Fatboy Slim and Tiesto at the Irish Dance Music Awards.

In 2008 Mog started up his own digital label, Ego Records. The labels first release "DJ Mog & Phil Crawf Present Tatoe & Groove – Scorpion" was crowned Tried & Tested record of the week by BBC Radio 1's Judge Jules and topped the DJ Download best sellers chart. As a remixer he teamed up with fellow Northern Irish producer Phil Crawf to remix the single, "Just When I Think There's An Answer" by The A&N Project (also known as Agnelli & Nelson). The remix featured on Judge Jules "Judgement Sundays" compilation which reached Top 10 in the UK album charts.

In the Summer of the same year Mog was handpicked by Judge Jules to join the line-up on the BBC Introducing stage at Creamfields 10th Anniversary Festival. His set was broadcast live from the festival on BBC Radio 1 & was filmed as part of a BBC documentary. He ended the year by supporting Armin van Buuren in front of 8000+ people in his hometown of Belfast at Planet Love's sold out Dance Against The Machine event.

In 2009 Mog released his first official single, "Searching". The single which featured singer Mark Le Sal on vocals became a huge worldwide radio hit & topped charts all over world, putting his name & record label firmly in the public eye. Later the same year he released the follow-up single, "Not For Long" which also featured singer Mark Le Sal on vocals. The single broke download records by becoming then first release to top DJ Download's Top 4 with different versions/remixes of the same release. The single was later complied alongside Deadmau5 & David Guetta for the Azuli Miami compilation series which reached the Top 10 in the UK album charts.

=== 2010 ===
In 2010 Mog released his debut artist album, Somewhere in Between. The album featured collaborations with producers Judge Jules, Paul Kennedy, John Gibbons, Scimon Tist & vocalists Mark Le Sal, Sarah Lynn and Amanda Angelic. The album's third single "Somewhere" featuring the singer Sarah Lynn was Mog's biggest hit to date. The single was signed to Nervous Records & reached number one on Billboard magazines Hot Dance Airplay Chart and remained in the Top 20 for over 8 weeks, as well as dominating radio and clubs back in Europe, the UK and Ireland. He was also chosen as support act for the Fatboy Slim and Deadmau5 sell-out concert in Belfast's Giant Park.

=== 2011 ===
At the start of 2011 Mog launched his weekly radio show on Northern Ireland's most popular music station, Cool FM & went Top 20 with the single, "Full Circle" feat Paul Kennedy & The Stetz. He also toured India supporting global chart sensation, Avicii

=== 2012 ===
Mog released his 1st solo single for 3 years, the instrumental track "Juntos". The track was signed to the famous Swedish record label "Stoney Boy" owned by Grammy nominated DJ/Producer, Stonebridge. The track received heavy support from radio stations such as BBC Radio 1 & incredibly despite featuring no vocals still reached Top 20 in Sweden. His track "Aimee" taken from his debut album "Somewhere in Between" (and featuring the vocals of Mark Le Sal) was used by the BBC as the backing for coverage of the GAA Championships. In the summer he launched his very own club night called "Karma" & teamed up with fellow Northern Irish producer (& one half of the legendary "Agnelli & Nelson") Robbie Nelson for the track, "Agarta". He has also announced that he has been in the studio working on a collaboration with his lifelong idol, Paul Masterson (Yomanda).

=== 2013–present ===
He remixed the single 'Hold On' for Grammy nominated DJ/Producer, Stonebridge. And remixed the track 'Raise Your Glasses' by Colorado producer Thyron!x which features the Canadian singer/songwriter Nora B. The track featured on Paul Oakenfold's 'We Are Planet Perfecto Vol. 03 – Vegas To Ibiza' compilation released by Armada Music.

== Planet Love ==
Mog has been the Planet Love resident DJ since 2006–present.

== Movies & TV ==
In 2012 DJ Mog's remix of 'So True' by Ago was used in the movie 'Miami II Ibiza'. The movie which was directed by Miguel Delgado and Jon Jacobs also features cameos from the likes of: Carl Cox, Tiësto, Judge Jules, Bob Sinclar & Pete Tong. Mog's remix was also used as part of the motion picture soundtrack.

In 2016 DJ Mog's song 'Feel' featuring vocals from Mark Le Sal was featured on the hit US TV show, 'Pretty Little Liars' in the 18th episode titled "Burn This" from Season 06.

== iPhone App ==
In 2010 Mog launched his own iPhone Application made available from the Apple App Store. He is also credited as one of the 1st producers to produce an electronic dance record using only apps available for the iPhone. The track that he produced was titled 'iTune' & was the outcome of a special feature on Judge Jules' BBC Radio 1 show. The feature (known as the Producer Challenge) set Mog the task of producing a song in less than a week using only his iPhone, iPhone headphones & the various apps available from the Apple App Store. The end result was then to be played the following week on the show for the listeners to judge. The 'iTune' proved to be extremely popular with both Judge Jules & the shows listeners and continued to be played on the show for several weeks after the feature. It has also appeared in both Judge Jules & Mog's live DJ Sets.

== Discography ==
=== Albums ===
- 2010: DJ Mog – Somewhere In Between

=== Singles ===
- 2008: DJ Mog & Phil Crawf Present Tatoe & Groove – Scorpion
- 2008: DJ Mog & Phil Crawf Present Tatoe & Groove – Tarantula
- 2009: DJ Mog feat Mark Le Sal – Searching
- 2009: DJ Mog – Rasharkin/Clouds EP
- 2009: DJ Mog feat Mark Le Sal – Not For Long
- 2010: DJ Mog feat Sarah Lynn – "Somewhere"
- 2010: DJ Mog & Paul Kennedy feat The Stetz – Full Circle
- 2011: DJ Mog & Erik K – Lylo/Miyana EP
- 2011: DJ Mog Presents Kinky Robot – Ruff & Ready
- 2011: DJ Mog & John Gibbons – Anello
- 2012: DJ Mog – Juntos
- 2012: DJ Mog Presents Kinky Robot – Fuzzy Wuzzy
- 2012: DJ Mog & Robbie Nelson – Agarta
- 2012: DJ Mog & John Gibbons – Adonis
- 2013: DJ Mog Presents Kinky Robot – Tongue N' Cheek
- 2014: DJ Mog – Juntos (StoneBridge Remix)

=== Remixes ===
- 2008: Mallorca Lee feat Jackie – Circles (DJ Mog & Phil Crawf Remix)
- 2008: A&N Project – Just When I Think There's an Answer (DJ Mog & Phil Crawf Remix)
- 2008: DJ Mog & Phil Crawf Present Tatoe & Groove (DJ Mog Remix)
- 2010: John Gibbons & Scimon Tist – Maktub (DJ Mog & John Gibbons Remix)
- 2010: Space Motion feat Jelena – Dauchi (DJ Mog & John Gibbons Remix)
- 2011: Robbie Nelson – Shangri-La (DJ Mog & John Gibbons Remix)
- 2011: Ago – So True (DJ Mog Remix)
- 2011: Kevlar – Feelings Are Weapons (DJ Mog Remix)
- 2011: Kamisshake – Dark Beat (DJ Mog & John Gibbons Remix)
- 2011: Life+ feat Joel Pack – Till I Breathe (DJ Mog Remix)
- 2011: Mark Sherry feat Sharone – Silent Tears (DJ Mog Remix)
- 2012: Ari Kyle & Audioscape Feat Ria – Throwback (DJ Mog Remix)
- 2013: Thyron!x Feat Nora B – Raise Your Glasses (DJ Mog Remix)
- 2013: StoneBridge, Matt Aubrey & Holevar ft H Watkins – Hold On (DJ Mog Remix)
- 2013: Fridge Magnets – Feeling Grows (DJ Mog Remix)
