= The Prismatic World Tour Live =

Video by Katy Perry
- Released: October 30, 2015
- Recorded: December 12–13, 2014
- Venues: Allphones Arena (Sydney, Australia)
- Length: 117 minutes (without bonus features); 147 minutes (with bonus features)
- Label: Capitol
- Director: Russell Thomas
- Producer: Simon Pizey

The Prismatic World Tour Live is a 2015 concert film and a live video album by American singer Katy Perry for her tour of the same name. It was released on October 30, 2015, by Capitol Records. The concert movie was released on DVD, Blu-ray, and for Digital Download. All formats also include 30 minutes of exclusive extras. Russell Thomas directed the concert film and Perry served as an executive producer for the album. Commercially, it topped the music video charts in Australia, Belgium, Italy, and the United States.

== Background and tour ==
It was announced that the final Sydney shows on December 12 and 13, 2014 would be filmed for a concert movie. Almost a year later, on November 23, 2015, it was broadcast on Network Seven. On March 28, 2015, Epix aired a two-hour concert special of the tour, as part of their "Free Preview Weekend". A short video interlude for "Peacock" was broadcast before Perry performed "Teenage Dream". During the exclusive Q&A with Epix, Perry confirmed that she will be making a DVD of the tour. She also revealed that she would change a couple of things for the DVD. Netflix added the tour's concert movie to its streaming service on June 26, 2015. The tour's concert movie was released on DVD, Blu-ray and Digital Download on October 30, 2015. All formats also include 30 minutes of exclusive extras.

== Track listing ==
Credits adapted from DVD liner notes

No.	Title	Writer(s)	Length
1.	"Roar"	Katy Perry; Lukasz Gottwald; Max Martin; Bonnie McKee; Henry Walter
2.	"Part of Me"	Perry; Gottwald; Martin; McKee
3.	"Wide Awake"	Perry; Gottwald; Martin; McKee; Walter
4.	"This Moment" / "Love Me"	Perry; Mikkel Eriksen; Tor Hermansen; Benjamin Levin; Christian Karlsson; Magnus Lidehäll; Martin; Vincent Pontare
5.	"Dark Horse"	Perry; Gottwald; Jordan Houston; Sarah Hudson; Martin; Walter
6.	"E.T."	Perry; Joshua Coleman; Gottwald; Martin
7.	"Legendary Lovers"	Perry; Gottwald; Martin; McKee; Walter
8.	"I Kissed a Girl"	Perry; Cathy Dennis; Gottwald; Martin
9.	"Hot n Cold"	Perry; Gottwald; Martin
10.	"International Smile"	Perry; Gottwald; Martin; Walter
11.	"By the Grace of God"	Perry; Greg Wells
12.	"The One That Got Away" / "Thinking of You"	Perry; Gottwald; Martin
13.	"Unconditionally"	Perry; Gottwald; Martin; Walter
14.	"Walking on Air"	Perry; Klas Åhlund; Adam Baptiste; Caméla Leierth; Martin
15.	"It Takes Two"	Perry; Eriksen; Hermansen; Levin; Emeli Sandé
16.	"This Is How We Do" / "Last Friday Night (T.G.I.F.)"	Perry; Åhlund; Martin; Gottwald; McKee
17.	"Teenage Dream"	Perry; Gottwald; Levin; Martin; McKee
18.	"California Gurls"	Perry; Calvin Broadus; Gottwald; Levin; Martin; McKee
19.	"Birthday"	Perry; Gottwald; Martin; McKee; Walter
20.	"Firework"	Perry; Ester Dean; Eriksen; Hermansen; Sandy Wilhelm

Plus, the Brillz remix of "This Is How We Do" was played in the end credits.

=== Bonus features ===
1. Behind the scenes
2. Stage build time lapse
3. Crew tidbits

== Personnel ==
Credits adapted from DVD liner notes.

- Director – Russell Thomas
- Producer – Simon Pizey
- Executive producers – Katy Perry, Steven Jensen, Martin Kirkup, Bradford Cobb, Baz Halpin
- Executive producers for Eagle Rock Entertainment – Terry Shand, Geoff Kempin
- Direct Management Group – Ngoc Hoang-Del Vecchio, Steven Jensen, Martin Kirkup, Bradford Cobb
- Stage Director – Baz Halpin
- Music Director – Kris Pooley
- Director of Photography – Brett Turnball
- Head of Production – Richael French
- Recorded and Mixed – Pete Keppler
- Mastering and 5.1 Mixing – Adam Ayan
- Dancers – Leah Adler, Khasan Brailsford, Lockhart Brownlie, Bryan Gaw, Loriel Hennington, Malik LeNost, Scott Myrick, Cassidy Noblett, Tracy Shibata, Britt Stewart
- Choreographers – RJ Durell, Nick Florez
- Background Vocals – Lauren 'Elle' Ball, Cherri Black
- Guitars – Casey Hooper, Nathan Spicer
- Keys – Max Hart
- Drums – Adam Marcello
- Bass – Joshua Moreau
- Legal and Clearance – Rochelle Winn, Jason Finestone
- Product Consultant – Gerry Gallacher
- Production Coordinators – Clarice Higgins, Rosie Holley, Mark Fossitt, Paul Bullock
- Design – Nikkie Amouyal
- Cover Photo – Matthias Vriens-McGrath
- Photos – Christie Goodwin

== Charts ==
=== Weekly charts ===
Chart (2015–2017)	Peak position
Australian Music DVD (ARIA)	1
Belgian Music DVD (Ultratop Flanders)	1
Belgian Music DVD (Ultratop Wallonia)	1
Dutch Music DVD (MegaCharts)	3
French Music DVD (SNEP)	2
German Albums (Offizielle Top 100)	32
Irish Music DVD (IRMA)	4
Italian Music DVD (FIMI)	1
Spanish Music DVD (Promusicae)	2
Swiss Music DVD (Schweizer Hitparade)	3
UK Music Videos (Official Charts)	2
US Music Video Sales (Billboard)	1

=== Year-end charts ===
Chart (2015)	Position
Dutch Music DVD (MegaCharts)	31
Chart (2016)	Position
Australian Music DVD (ARIA)	5
Chart (2017)	Position
Australian Music DVD (ARIA)	9

== Certifications ==
Region	Certification	Certified units/sales
Australia (ARIA)	2× Platinum	30,000^{^}
Brazil (Pro-Música Brasil)	Gold	15,000^{*}
^{*} Sales figures based on certification alone.^{^} Shipments figures based on certification alone.

== Release history ==
Region	Date	Format(s)	Label(s)	Ref.
United States	October 30, 2015	DVD, Blu-ray and Digital Download	Capitol Records	
