= When I'm Gone (Alesso and Katy Perry song) =

2021 single by Alesso and Katy Perry

Single by Alesso and Katy Perry
- Released: 29 December 2021
- Genre: Pop; EDM; house
- Length: 2:41
- Label: 10:22 PM
- Songwriters: Katy Perry; Alessandro Lindblad; Alida Garpestad Peck; Rami Yacoub; Nathan Cunningham; Marc Sibley; Alma Goodman
- Producers: Alesso; Space Primates

Alesso singles chronology
"Chasing Stars" (2021)	"When I'm Gone" (2021)	"Words" (2022)

Katy Perry singles chronology
"Electric" (2021)	"When I'm Gone" (2021)	"Woman's World" (2024)

Music video
- "When I'm Gone" on YouTube

"When I'm Gone" is a song by Swedish DJ and record producer Alesso and the American singer-songwriter Katy Perry. It was released on 29 December 2021 by 10:22 PM Records. It coincides with the first date of Play—Perry's Las Vegas concert residency. The song is an EDM, pop, and house tune, written by Perry, Alesso, Alida Garpestad Peck, Rami Yacoub, Nathan Cunningham, Marc Sibley, and Alma Goodman, and produced by Alesso and the Space Primates.

"When I'm Gone" was released alongside a music video that was directed by Hannah Lux Davis, and choreographed by Sean Bankhead. The song reached number one in Croatia and has also entered the top 10 in Bulgaria, the Czech Republic, Russia, and Slovakia as well as the top 20 in Lebanon, the Netherlands, and Poland, and the top 30 in Belgium and Hungary. The single was the third-bestselling song of 2022 in Croatia. Perry performed the track as a medley with "Walking on Air" (2013) at Play, during CNN's New Year's Eve Live, and on Saturday Night Live. The official music video premiered on 10 January 2022 on ESPN during the halftime show of the 2022 College Football Playoff National Championship.

== Release and promotion ==
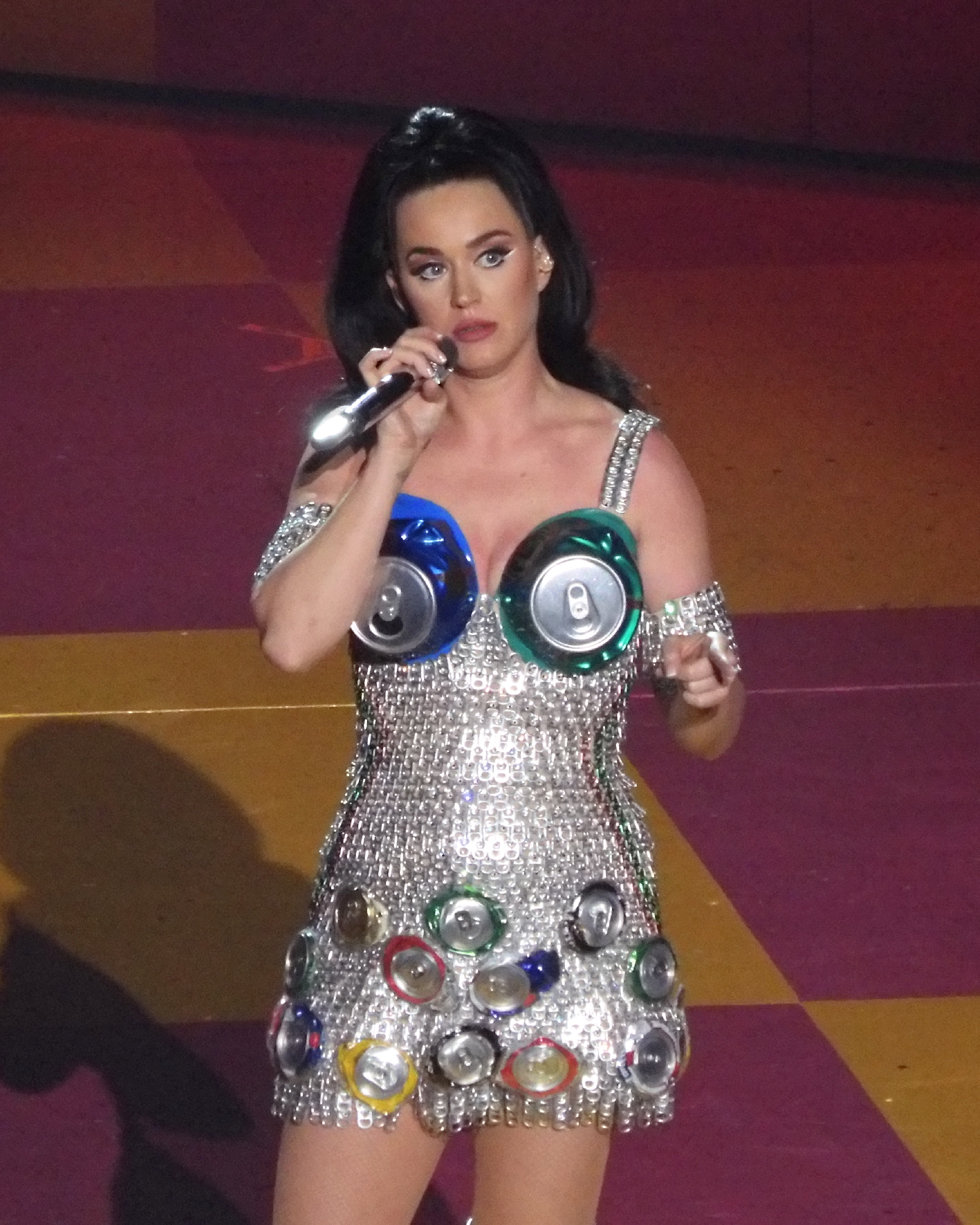
Perry performing "When I'm Gone" at her concert residency Play

On 15 December 2021, Alesso and Perry announced the song and released a small snippet of the song and music video via their social media accounts. The song was released on 29 December 2021, the same day that Perry began her residency show Play. The song appears on the setlist of her 2021-2022 Las Vegas Residency, Play, at Resorts World Las Vegas. It is performed with her song "Walking on Air" (from her 2013 album, Prism). On 31 December 2021, her performance of the song (from her residency) was also included as a part of the CNN's New Year's Eve Live special. On 29 January 2022, Perry also performed the song on Saturday Night Live, introduced by Willem Dafoe.

== Composition ==
"When I'm Gone" is a dance-pop, house, and electropop song that runs for 2 minutes and 41 seconds. Alesso said: "I feel like a song like this hasn't been made in a while. The world needs a fun energetic dance record again. We worked on this song for more than a year and are so pleased with how it came out."

== Critical reception ==
Justin Curto from Vulture wrote "When I'm Gone" is "another EDM bop" that is similar to Perry's 2019 single "Never Really Over" in cadence and rhythm. 360 said the song blends "high-tech" beats with heartbreaking lyrics, and complimented Alesso's production. Official Charts Company gave a positive review and wrote: "Over a thumping house-beat, Katy says she's 'going to give them everything that they want', and this high-tempo banger will certainly win over a huge swathe of pop fans."

== Commercial performance ==
In the United States, "When I'm Gone" charted in the Bubbling Under Hot 100, before debuting on the primary Billboard Hot 100 chart at number 97 in the week dated 22 February 2022, becoming Perry's 35th entry and Alesso's third on the chart. It peaked at number 90. "When I'm Gone" also debuted at number four on Dance/Electronic Digital Song Sales and number 17 on the overall Hot Dance/Electronic Songs list. The song has been certified gold by the Recording Industry Association of America for equivalent sales of 500,000 units in the United States.

In the United Kingdom, "When I'm Gone" debuted at number 72 on Official Singles Chart as the sixth highest new-entry of the week. It rose to number 49 in its eighth week on the chart, and further peaked at number 27 on both the UK Official Singles Sales Chart Top 100 and Downloads Chart Top 100 charts. In Canada, "When I'm Gone" debuted at number 54 on Canadian Hot 100, as her 38th career entry on the chart. It also debuted at number seven on the Canadian Digital Songs Sales chart.

== Music video ==
The accompanying music video premiered 10 January 2022 on ESPN, during halftime of the 2022 College Football Playoff National Championship; it was the first music video to debut during a live event on ESPN. The video features a Boston Dynamics robot named "Spot" which in the video Perry named "Nugget" after her own personal dog.

Perry describes it as her first "full-blown choreography" video due to the "sexy" production of the song. The video was choreographed by Sean Bankhead, and was directed by Hannah Lux Davis. According to Perry, it was shot at a Budweiser brewery. Davis said: "We were going for something that was more Black Mirror. Slightly futuristic, but we still wanted it to feel grounded. Tech sci-fi but make it pop." Perry wears a custom Dolce & Gabbana purple jumpsuit in the video, describing it as her "favorite outfit". People called it "mesmerising", further saying: "In true Perry style, the video features some stunning costumes and impressive dance moves."

== Track listing ==
- Digital download and streaming
  1. "When I'm Gone" – 2:41
- Digital download (VIP mix)
  1. "When I'm Gone" (VIP mix) – 2:51
- Streaming (VIP mix)
  1. "When I'm Gone" (VIP mix) – 2:51
  2. "When I'm Gone" – 2:41

== Charts ==
=== Weekly charts ===
Weekly chart performance for "When I'm Gone"
Chart (2021–2024)	Peak position
Australia (ARIA)	96
Belgium (Ultratop 50 Flanders)	25
Belgium (Ultratop 50 Wallonia)	48
Bulgaria International (PROPHON)	7
Canada Hot 100 (Billboard)	54
Canada CHR/Top 40 (Billboard)	30
Canada Hot AC (Billboard)	20
CIS Airplay (TopHit)	7
Croatia International Airplay (Top lista)	1
Czech Republic Airplay (ČNS IFPI)	4
Euro Digital Song Sales (Billboard)	14
Finland Airplay (Radiosoittolista)	49
Germany (GfK)	88
Global 200 (Billboard)	82
Guatemala (Monitor Latino)	13
Hungary (Editors' Choice Top 40)	8
Hungary (Single Top 40)	22
Ireland (IRMA)	59
Italy Airplay (EarOne)	16
Kazakhstan Airplay (TopHit)	197
Latvia Airplay (TopHit)	16
Lebanon Airplay (Lebanese Top 20)	17
Mexico (Billboard Mexican Airplay)	39
Netherlands (Dutch Top 40)	11
Netherlands (Single Top 100)	61
New Zealand Hot Singles (RMNZ)	5
Nicaragua Anglo (Monitor Latino)	11
Poland Airplay (ZPAV)	12
Russia Airplay (TopHit)	6
San Marino (SMRRTV Top 50)	26
Slovakia Airplay (ČNS IFPI)	5
Sweden (Sverigetopplistan)	91
UK Singles (Official Charts)	49
UK Dance (Official Charts)	15
US Billboard Hot 100	90
US Adult Pop Airplay (Billboard)	12
US Hot Dance/Electronic Songs (Billboard)	4
US Pop Airplay (Billboard)	24

=== Monthly charts ===
Monthly chart performance for "When I'm Gone"
Chart (2022)	Peak position
CIS (TopHit)	10
Russia Airplay (TopHit)	12

=== Year-end charts ===
Year-end chart performance for "When I'm Gone"
Chart (2022)	Position
Belgium (Ultratop 50 Flanders)	101
CIS Airplay (TopHit)	36
Croatia (HRT)	3
El Salvador (Monitor Latino)	99
Honduras (Monitor Latino)	69
Italy Airplay (EarOne)	66
Netherlands (Dutch Top 40)	58
Russia Airplay (TopHit)	45
US Adult Top 40 (Billboard)	39
US Hot Dance/Electronic Songs (Billboard)	9

== Certifications ==
Certifications for "When I'm Gone"
Region	Certification	Certified units/sales
Brazil (Pro-Música Brasil)	2× Platinum	80,000^{‡}
Finland	Gold	2,000
Italy (FIMI)	Gold	50,000^{‡}
New Zealand (RMNZ)	Gold	15,000^{‡}
Poland (ZPAV)	Gold	25,000^{‡}
Spain (Promusicae)	Gold	30,000^{‡}
United Kingdom (BPI)	Silver	200,000^{‡}
United States (RIAA)	Gold	500,000^{‡}
^{‡} Sales+streaming figures based on certification alone.

== Release history ==
Release dates and formats for "When I'm Gone"
Region	Date	Format(s)	Version	Label	Ref.
Various	29 December 2021	Digital download; streaming	Original	10:22 PM	
Italy	31 December 2021	Radio airplay	Original	Universal	
United States	10 January 2022	Hot adult contemporary radio	Original	10:22 PM; Capitol	
United States	11 January 2022	Contemporary hit radio	Original	10:22 PM; Capitol	
Various	18 February 2022	Digital download; streaming	VIP mix	10:22 PM	
