= Aya Tanimura =

American film producer

Aya Tanimura is an Australian-Japanese writer and director, based in Los Angeles, California.

== Career ==
=== Short films ===
Her directorial credits include Mobius (2011), U-2074 (2010), and Mrs. Kim, (2010) which was a finalist in Los Angeles Magazine's Get L.A. short film competition. Also produced in 2010, Tanimura's film Sweet-As won the People's Choice award and was a finalist for Tourism New Zealand's '100% Pure New Zealand Presents Your Big Break' short film competition. In 2013, Tanimura produced Kill of the Night under Visual Communications' Armed With a Camera fellowship which premiered at the Los Angeles Asian Pacific Film Festival and later screened at the Lady Filmmakers Film Festival.

=== Music videos ===
In 2013, Tanimura directed lyric videos for Katy Perry's songs "Roar" and "Unconditionally".

In 2014, she directed Perry's lyric video for "Birthday" which was one of the 2014 MTV VMA nominees for "Best Lyric Video."

In 2016 she directed Alessia Cara's music video for "How Far I'll Go".

In 2017, she directed Perry's lyric video for "Chained to the Rhythm".

In 2021, she directed One Direction member Liam Payne's music video for the Ron's Gone Wrong song "Sunshine".

== See also ==
- List of film and television directors
- List of people from Los Angeles
- List of music video directors
