= This Is How We Do =

- Riff Raff remix cover art

Single by Katy Perry

from the album Prism
- Released: July 31, 2014
- Recorded: 2013
- Studio: Apmamman (Stockholm, Sweden); Conway Recording Studios (Los Angeles, CA); MXM Studios (Stockholm, Sweden)
- Genre: Dance-pop
- Length: 3:24
- Label: Capitol
- Songwriters: Katy Perry; Klas Åhlund; Max Martin
- Producers: Åhlund; Max Martin

Katy Perry singles chronology
"Birthday" (2014)	"This Is How We Do" (2014)	"Rise" (2016)

Music video
- "This Is How We Do" on YouTube

"This Is How We Do" is a song by American singer Katy Perry from her fourth studio album, Prism (2013). Perry co-wrote the track with its producers Max Martin and Klas Åhlund and recorded it in Stockholm, Sweden. The song was released as the album's fifth and final single along with its music video on July 31, 2014. "This Is How We Do" is a dance-pop song influenced by hip hop, having "synth squiggles" and "melodic dots" as its main instrumentation. Lyrically, it has Perry sing-talking about her hangout routine with her friends. The song's official remix featuring American rapper Riff Raff was released on August 25, 2014.

Commercially, the song reached the top 10 in Canada and Israel while peaking within the top 20 in Australia, Austria, the Czech Republic, Lebanon, the Netherlands, New Zealand, and Slovakia as well as the top 30 in Finland, Scotland, Sweden, the United States, and Venezuela. Joel Kefali directed the song's accompanying music video, which was released on July 31, 2014. It features the singer enjoying summer and having fun with her friends. The song was performed on Perry's Prismatic World Tour, and appeared on the Prismatic World Tour concert film The Prismatic World Tour Live.

== Production and release ==
The Swedish people really have quite an ear for pop music and it's been historically known that the Swedes know how to make pop music very well and of course I wanted to tap into something of that.

— Perry about working with the Swedish producers.

While working on Prism, Perry collaborated in Stockholm with record producer Max Martin for a few weeks to put "the icing on the cake," as she claimed. In addition, she also worked with Klas Åhlund, among others. Perry has claimed:

"Max has always been incredibly kind to me, he is the most authentic Swedish person I have ever worked with, and he just has an incredible ear for melodies and how they should be, we had so much fun making music together, we get really excited, we like to dance around the studio. He brought me to Stockholm to introduce me to a couple of different musicians, like Klaus Ahlund, I really enjoyed working with them. The different kind of sonic level of music that's been made over in Sweden is very advanced and it's very fresh... they kinda know what is coming first."

About working with Perry, Ahlund stated, "When you move around the planet, the vibe of the place you're making the music in definitely makes an imprint on whatever you're writing." While co-producing nine tracks on Prism, Martin and Åhlund worked together on two tracks: "Walking on Air" and "This Is How We Do". The first was released as a promotional single, while the latter was announced as the album's fifth single, with its lyric video being released on July 24, 2014. "This Is How We Do" was sent to radio stations on August 12, 2014. The Brillz remix of the song was released through SoundCloud on August 14, 2014. Another remix of the song, featuring rapper Riff Raff, was also released through SoundCloud on August 21, 2014, then released through iTunes on August 25, 2014.

== Composition ==
"This Is How We Do" is a dance-pop song, and was written by Perry with producers Max Martin and Klas Åhlund, who were also responsible for programming of the song, while Perry also provided background vocals. It is set in the time signature of common time and has a moderate hip hop tempo of 96 beats per minute. The song is written in the key of A minor, and Perry's vocals span from the low note of A_{3} to the high note of C_{6}. The song has been described as a "wobbling dance track", with hip-hop underpinnings and "faux-urban west coast pose". Randall Roberts of Los Angeles Times remarked that the song is "replete with synth squiggles and melodic dots—slowed and chopped." Kitty Empire of The Observer claimed that the song is "a sequel of sorts to both 'California Gurls', and 'Last Friday Night (T.G.I.F.)', Perry's previous party-hearty mega-hits."

Lyrically, "This Is How We Do" finds Perry sing-talking about her hangout routine with her friends, also encouraging her fans to spend money they don't have just so they can have a good time, as noted by Stephen Thomas Erlewine of AllMusic. Empire claimed that on the song, Perry and her friends "are on the prowl for tacos and "hotties", "sucking really bad at Mariah Carey-oke". While also claiming that the song recalls her own 'Last Friday Night (T.G.I.F.)', Ben Ratliff of The New York Times claimed that its lyrics are "more modest, adult, and middle-class idea of fun—tacos, karaoke, and "gettin' our nails did, all Japanese-y." The song also has a repetitive bridge where Perry repeats, "This is no big deal", an outro where Perry asks to "bring the beat back", while Perry also gives a shout-out to her diehards: "This one goes out to the ladies at breakfast ... in last night's dress. Uh-huh. I see you," she says.

== Critical reception ==
Stephen Thomas Erlewine of AllMusic claimed that "even when she cheers on excess on 'This Is How We Do' she's not a participant but rather a ringmaster," picking the song as one of the album's highlights. Jason Lipshut of Billboard wrote that the song "carries 'song of next summer' potential," while Edna Gundersen of USA Today named it a "buoyant pop blast." In a similar vein, James Montgomery of MTV News described the track as "a cocksure, club-ready banger." Nick Catucci of Entertainment Weekly called it "irresistibly bouncy," while Andy Gill of The Independent noted that the song "offers the year's best top-down cruising anthem." Rob Harvilla of Spin enjoyed the track, but felt it was not as strong as "Last Friday Night", ultimately calling it "a knuckleheaded, bottle-service party jam."

Chris Bosman of Consequence criticized the "'this goes out to the [blank]' coda", claiming that "it only hammers home how much better Kesha is at this stuff." Melinda Newman of HitFix gave the song a "C−" grade, claiming that "It's hard not to raise your arm in the air and wave it back and forth in this old-school sounding track about partying, claiming that the song is "unlike anything else Perry has recorded before" and that it "could be a sleeper hit." Evan Sawdey of PopMatters was mixed with the song, calling it an "odd number, where her lyrics swing from actually-clever ('suckin' real bad at Mariah Carey-oke') to a bit worrisome ('getting' our nails did / all Japanese-y')." While calling it "a Ke$ha-grade throwdown", Sal Cinquemani of Slant Magazine claimed that the track "features possibly the dumbest lyric of the year." Philip Matusavage of musicOMH felt that the song "is so clearly calculated to every second that it instead feels cynical."

== Chart performance ==
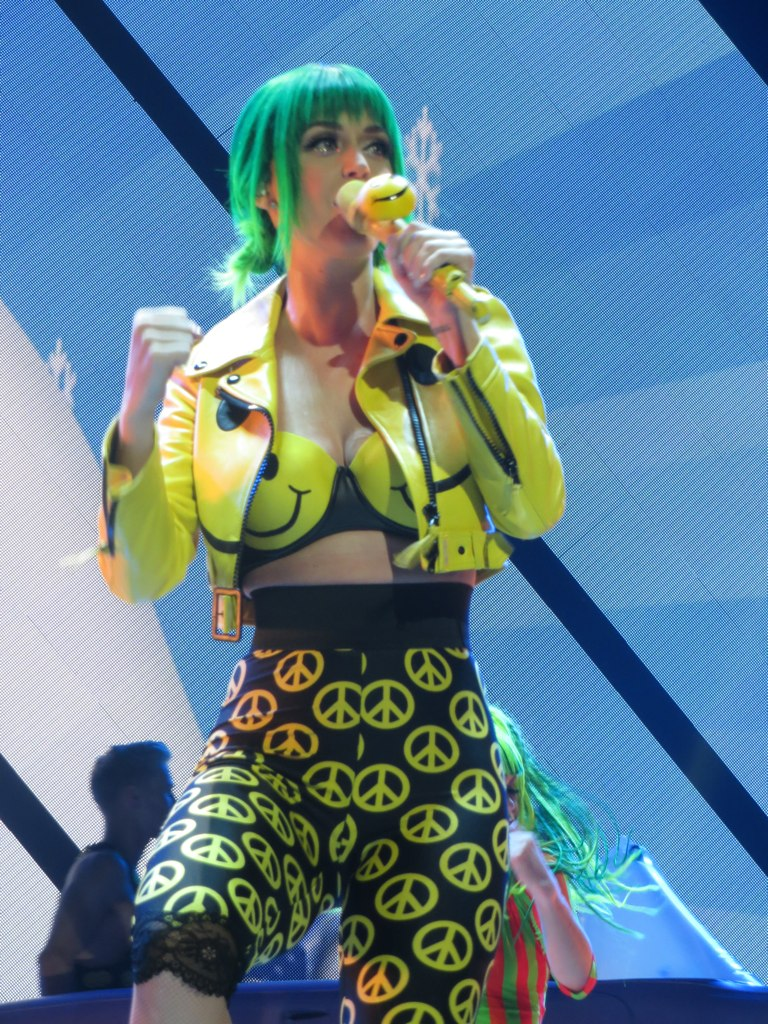
Perry performing "This Is How We Do" in Glasgow

"This Is How We Do" first charted on South Korea's Gaon Download Chart and the Canadian Hot 100 when its parent album was released, debuting at number 73, with sales of 2,263 copies, and number 88, respectively. When it was released as a single, the song charted moderately throughout the world. In Canada, where the song had previously charted, the song achieved more success, reaching number nine, becoming the fourth top-10 single from the album, and her 16th overall. In the United States, after the video's release, the song debuted at number 88 on the Billboard Hot 100 chart of August 16, 2014. The song eventually peaked at number 24, becoming the sixth song from Prism to reach the top 40. On the Pop Songs chart, it debuted at number 37 and peaked at number 15; her second of her career to miss the top-10 and first in five years. On the other hand, on the Hot Dance Club Songs chart, the song peaked at number-one, further extending her record of most consecutive songs to top the "Dance Club" chart to 15. The song has sold more than 2,000,000 copies in the United States; consequently it was certified double Platinum by the Recording Industry Association of America (RIAA).

In New Zealand, the song debuted at number 20, reaching its peak position the following week, number 13, where it remained for a further week, becoming her highest charting single since "Dark Horse". In Australia, it debuted at number 27 and peaked at number 18, three weeks later, becoming her 15th top-20 single. In Austria and Netherlands, while peaking at numbers 14 and 20, respectively, the song was also the third highest charting single after "Roar" and "Dark Horse". In France, however, "This Is How We Do" and "Birthday", the album's last two singles, were the only two tracks of the album to miss the top-40. In the United Kingdom, the song peaked at number 33 on the UK Singles Chart.

== Music video ==
=== Production and synopsis ===
On July 24, 2014, a lyric video for the song was uploaded to YouTube. The official music video for the song, directed by New Zealand filmmaker Joel Kefali and produced during a three-day studio shoot in Los Angeles, was released on July 31, 2014. According to the director, he was trying to "fully interpret the pop nature of Katy Perry, because [he] hadn't done any straight down the line pop videos before. [His] idea was to make a pop video but to keep some edge to it, and make it feel like it was pop art... We did a studio-based shoot where we used lots of animation and props, and then each line of the song had its own little vignette. I wanted to do something that was close to the work I'd already done. I like mixed media, jumping between live action and animation, and I focus more on design."

The music video opens with a visual of an old man staring at a painting, which turns out to be Perry. The video features Perry, accompanied by model Aglae Kounkou and dancer Leah Adler, in front of various backdrops, including a kitchen, a ping pong table, a bathtub, a 3D version of Piet Mondrian's Composition with Red Blue and Yellow, and an ice cream truck. The video also includes a myriad of male dancers in grey suits and red bowties, who also move furniture and props around. A scene during the bridge of the song shows various young adults in midair while food flies around them, and also features Perry on a Skype call with someone named "Jessica Thot". The video also features various animated cartoon versions of ice cream, pizza, and watermelon, which are all shown dancing at the end of the video.

=== Reception ===
Joe Lynch of Billboard said the video is "an explosion of pop art, vintage fashion and twerking ice cream cones". Zayda Rivera of New York Daily News commented that in the video "Perry boasts about living a carefree lifestyle without consequences," writing that it's "all about having fun no matter what." While writing that the video "has that quintessential Katy feel", Alyssa Toomey of E! added that it "feels like a combination of [Perry]'s lyric video for 'Roar' and her 2010 smash hit 'California Gurls'." Jon Blistein of Rolling Stone named it "a hyper-stylized, pastel-soaked pleasure dome." Lindsey Weber of Vulture claimed that "after the underwhelming 'Birthday' [music video], Katy Perry's video for 'This Is How We Do' is full of summertime treats and Tumblr-inspired iconography." Chris Martins of Spin claimed that "the wild clip is almost OK Go-level ambitious, employing bizarre sets, unique costumery, and a whole lot of color to bring the bouncy single to life."

== Charts ==
=== Weekly charts ===
Weekly chart performance
Chart (2013–2014)	Peak position
Argentina (Los 40)	13
Australia (ARIA)	18
Austria (Ö3 Austria Top 40)	14
Belgium (Ultratop 50 Flanders)	36
Belgium (Ultratop 50 Wallonia)	37
Canada Hot 100 (Billboard)	9
Canada AC (Billboard)	44
Canada CHR/Top 40 (Billboard)	13
Canada Hot AC (Billboard)	12
CIS Airplay (TopHit)	150
Colombia (National-Report)	13
Czech Republic Airplay (ČNS IFPI)	27
Czech Republic Singles Digital (ČNS IFPI)	12
Finland Airplay (Radiosoittolista)	24
France (SNEP)	14
Germany (GfK)	34
Hungary (Editors' Choice Top 40)	34
Hungary (Stream Top 40)	20
Iceland (Tónlistinn)	28
Ireland (IRMA)	31
Israel (Media Forest TV Airplay)	3
Italy (FIMI)	34
Lebanon Airplay (Lebanese Top 20)	15
Mexico Anglo (Monitor Latino)	18
Netherlands (Dutch Top 40)	14
Netherlands (Single Top 100)	20
New Zealand (Recorded Music NZ)	13
Scottish Singles Sales (Official Charts)	25
Slovakia Airplay (ČNS IFPI)	28
Slovakia Singles Digital (ČNS IFPI)	17
Slovenia (SloTop50)	48
South Korea (Gaon International Chart)	73
Sweden (Sverigetopplistan)	26
Switzerland (Schweizer Hitparade)	41
UK Singles (Official Charts)	33
US Billboard Hot 100	24
US Adult Pop Airplay (Billboard)	22
US Dance Club Songs (Billboard)	1
US Pop Airplay (Billboard)	15
Venezuela Pop General (Record Report)	24

=== Year-end charts ===
Annual chart rankings
Chart (2014)	Position
Australia (ARIA)	89
Canada (Canadian Hot 100)	61
Netherlands (Dutch Top 40)	81
Netherlands (Single Top 100)	84
US Dance Club Songs (Billboard)	43

== Certifications and sales ==
Certifications and sales
Region	Certification	Certified units/sales
Australia (ARIA)	3× Platinum	210,000^{‡}
Brazil (Pro-Música Brasil)	Diamond	250,000^{‡}
Canada (Music Canada)	2× Platinum	160,000^{‡}
Finland	Platinum	4,000
France	—	10,500 (Note: Available sales figures in France.)
Italy (FIMI)	Gold	15,000^{‡}
New Zealand (RMNZ)	Platinum	15,000^{*}
Norway (IFPI Norway)	Platinum	10,000^{‡}
South Korea	—	2,263 (Note: South Korea first-week sales figures.)
Sweden (GLF)	Platinum	40,000^{‡}
United Kingdom (BPI)	Silver	200,000^{‡}
United States (RIAA)	2× Platinum	2,000,000^{‡}
Streaming
Denmark (IFPI Danmark)	Gold	1,300,000^{†}
^{*} Sales figures based on certification alone.^{‡} Sales+streaming figures based on certification alone.^{†} Streaming-only figures based on certification alone.

== Release history ==
Release dates and formats
Region	Date	Format(s)	Version	Label	Ref.
France	July 31, 2014	Radio airplay	Original	Universal	
United States	August 11, 2014	Hot adult contemporary radio; rhythmic contemporary radio	Original	Capitol	
United States	August 12, 2014	Contemporary hit radio	Original	Capitol	
Finland	August 25, 2014	Digital download	Remix featuring Riff Raff	Capitol	
Germany	August 25, 2014	Digital download	Remix featuring Riff Raff	Capitol	
United States	August 25, 2014	Digital download	Remix featuring Riff Raff	Capitol	
Italy	September 5, 2014	Radio airplay	Original	Capitol	
