= Christie Goodwin =

English art photographer

- Born: 1962
- Occupation: Photographer
- Website: www.christiegoodwin.com

Christie Goodwin (born 1962) is an English art photographer who specialises in music photography.

== Biography ==
Goodwin received her BA (hons) in Art Photography from the Royal Academy of Fine Arts in Antwerp in 1986, and worked freelance as a photojournalist for press agencies. In 2005, she made the move to music photography, when a manager for Status Quo saw her work. She is mainly commissioned for album photography, DVD photography and official tour photography.

She was the official tour photographer on tours for Katy Perry, Ed Sheeran, Taylor Swift, One Direction, Usher, Joe Bonamassa, AC/DC and others. She has worked on several concert movies, including One Direction's One Direction: This Is Us (2013) and Katy Perry's The Prismatic World Tour Live (2015). She has also worked as the house photographer for the Royal Albert Hall in London.

In 2012, she was one of 47 photographers whose work was featured in a London exhibition of photographs of female musicians by women. In 2021, she was one of the photographers featured in the six part documentary series Icon: Music Through The Lens. In 2023, she was part of the Chicago exhibition From Her To Eternity: The Women Who Photograph Music, curated by Courtney Love. In 2025 she became President of the CEWE Photo Award, after serving on the Jury since 2019.
