= By the Grace of God (song) =

2013 song by Katy Perry

Song by Katy Perry

from the album Prism
- Released: October 18, 2013
- Recorded: November 2012
- Studio: Rocket Carousel Studios (Los Angeles, California)
- Genre: Christian pop
- Length: 4:27
- Label: Capitol
- Songwriters: Katy Perry; Greg Wells
- Producers: Greg Wells; Katy Perry

Audio video
- "By the Grace of God" on YouTube

"By the Grace of God" is a song by American singer Katy Perry from her fourth studio album, Prism (2013), included as the standard edition's final track. The song, a Christian pop record, was written and produced by Perry and Canadian record producer Greg Wells, and was recorded in November 2012, at Rocket Carousel Studios, based in Los Angeles, California. It was conceived following Perry's divorce from English actor and comedian Russell Brand. This initially made Perry consider making a "darker" album, but instead was channeled into the song. Throughout its autobiographical lyrics, Perry is depicted finding her strength and standing up for herself.

The track was first unveiled at Perry's headlining set at the 2013 Apple Music Festival. Upon the release of Prism, "By the Grace of God" received generally positive reviews from music critics, who appreciated its vulnerability and picked it as one of the musical highlights from the album. Following the digital sales of Prism, it charted at number 179 in the United Kingdom and number 77 in South Korea, alongside charting at number 70 on the Canadian Digital Song Sales chart. It also peaked within the top 10 of the Billboard Bubbling Under Hot 100 Singles chart in the United States, where it also charted at number 71 on their Digital Song Sales chart.

== Background and production ==
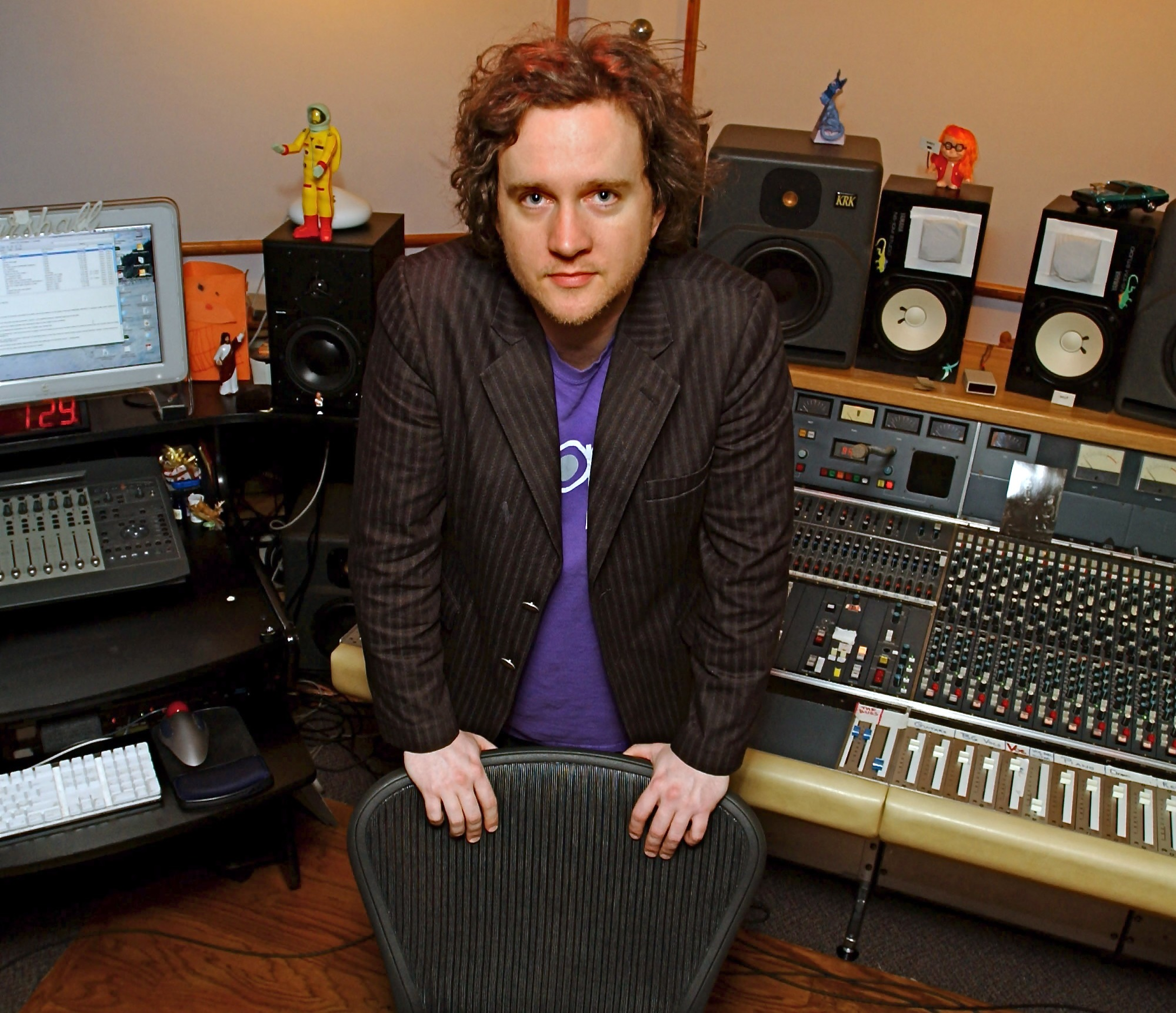
Canadian record producer and frequent collaborator Greg Wells (pictured) co-wrote and co-produced "By the Grace of God" with Perry.

After English actor and comedian Russell Brand divorced Perry in late December 2011, she was so distraught over the event that she considered committing suicide. Greg Wells, who assisted Perry with the composition of "By the Grace of God", commented on the situation: "I think she felt so kicked in the head and so publicly embarrassed at being divorced by a text message". After overcoming her suicidal thoughts and initial shock, she felt prompted to create a "darker" project as compared to her previous albums. Instead, she channelled the entire divorce event into "By the Grace of God", in which its lyrics depict Perry battling against her suicidal thoughts while lying on her bathroom floor. During an interview with Entertainment Weekly, Perry spoke on how she felt during the breakup: "Imagine what you go through. Imagine what happens when you go through a break up. We all go through break ups and we all get very depressed and desperate."

"By the Grace of God" was unveiled to industry insiders during a listening party for Prism held in Manhattan, while its inclusion on the album track list was confirmed on October 1, 2013. Perry confirmed that the song was the only one included in Prism about her divorce from Brand. However, the song "Ghost", also present on Prism, includes references to the divorce, particularly the lyric "You sent a text, it was like the wind changed your mind", although Perry stated that the track was not about the split. She further stated: "That's the funny thing – it's not about that chapter in my life, people think that certain songs are about certain people and there is only one song about that time in my life and that song is 'By the Grace of God'".

Unlike many of the album's songs which were written by a multitude of collaborators, "By the Grace of God" was composed solely by Perry and Greg Wells. Wells also co-wrote "Choose Your Battles", the third bonus track from the album's deluxe edition. For this track, he contributed with playing drums, piano, and the synthesizer. The song was engineered by Ian McGregor at Rocket Carousel Studio in Los Angeles, and mixed by Serban Ghenea at MixStar Studios, Virginia Beach.

== Composition ==
'By the Grace of God'
A 22-second sample of the song's chorus, in which Perry finds her strength, singing "By the grace of God / I picked myself back up / I put one foot in front of the other and I / Looked in the mirror and decided to stay".

At a length of four minutes and twenty-seven seconds, "By the Grace of God" is a pop piano-driven power ballad. With a stripped-down production, its instrumental is essentially composed of the sounds of various musical instruments, such as drums, piano and synthesizers along with military drums. Throughout the song, drums, piano, and synthesizers are used in its instrumental. According to the sheet music published by Alfred Publishing Co., Inc. on Musicnotes.com, it is composed in the key of G minor and set in a 4/4 time signature at a tempo of 82 beats per minute. The melody spans the tonal range of B♭_{3} to D_{5}, while the music follows the chord progression of Gm—E♭sus2—B♭—Gm—E♭sus2—Fsus4.

"I had sweaty palms presenting the lyrics. To this day I still feel very vulnerable about revealing that snapshot in my life but the feedback I have gotten from it is more valuable than my own insecurities. It makes people feel like they are not so alone in their situation..... that they don't feel crazy because they think 'Oh my God, someone else has that feeling too and I can hear it in their song'." —Perry, on "By the Grace of God"

Lyrically, Perry is depicted as having suicidal thoughts and lying on the floor of a bathroom. The song opens with only piano and Perry's vocals, while she sings "Was twenty-seven, surviving my return from Saturn", and as the song carries on, she finds her strength, singing "By the grace of God / I picked myself back up / I put one foot in front of the other and I / Looked in the mirror and decided to stay / Wasn't gonna let love take me out that way". Perry commented on the lyrics: "[They] are very exact and autobiographical. That's how I write. But the one thing about those lyrics is you can hear me finding my strength throughout the song. It starts off really low and then I kind of stand up for myself and say, 'No!'." The song also sees Perry rejecting the idea that the relationship ended because of her.

Kitty Empire from The Guardian observed that the song served as a "vulnerable yin" to Perry's hit single "Roar"'s "righteous yang". Josh Duboff from Vanity Fair highlighted the titles of "By the Grace of God" and deluxe edition song "Spiritual", concluding that the religious undertones were "more prominent" in Prism. Helen Brown from The Daily Telegraph deemed the song "tender", and Jason Lipshutz from Billboard said it "is the most revealing song Perry will likely ever pen".

== Critical reception ==
Upon its release, "By the Grace of God" received generally positive reviews. Jason Lipshutz from Billboard thought the song was "obviously not the radio fare fans are used to from the pop star (Perry)", but that it was "crucial for anyone trying to understand Perry's Prism mind set". Philip Matusavage from musicOMH considered that "the fact that ["By the Grace of God"] is the album highlight and is the only song written by less than three people" is an indicator of what Perry should do next. Greg Kot from the Chicago Tribune appreciated "Ghost" and "By the Grace of God" for allowing Perry's vulnerability "to seep through". In his review of Prism, Sam Lansky from Idolator showed himself divided relatively to the song: he classified it as the "most sonically conventional thing [in the album]" although he immediately stated it was "also the most emotionally gripping" in it.

Randall Roberts from the Los Angeles Times affirmed that the song was "cosmic" and that it had a "humming, dark tension in which Perry and melody float like red balloons". Helen Brown from The Daily Telegraph declared that, in the song, Perry "sounds like a woman, and an artist, who's finally found herself". Allison Stewart from The Washington Post said that "By the Grace of God" ranked "among Perry's strongest (tracks)", and that it was "her most strangely sensible and affecting song ever, one that distances her from her suddenly-more-callow-seeming peers and also from Brand". John Walker from MTV highlighted the fact that the song is "light on figures of speech and all-too accessible platitudes", as compared to the metaphors present on the lyrics of "Wide Awake".

In contrast, Sal Cinquemani from Slant Magazine described it as "a sappy Paula Cole-style statement of self-actualization". Jon Dolan from Rolling Stone criticized its lyrics and negatively likened them to those of Alanis Morissette. Kitty Empire from The Guardian found the song to be "ridden with cliché". Mesfin Fekadu from ABC News thought both tracks were "good", but stated that they "could be great if Perry didn't hold back and explored more lyrically and sonically". Chris Bosman from Consequence of Sound criticized its placement on the album track listing and thought that they "would stand out more if they ('By The Grace of God', and closing track 'Double Rainbow') hadn't been forced to rub elbows, thus stealing momentum and impact from each other". Carl Williott from Idolator praised the track as a "nice counterpart to "Roar."

== Commercial performance ==
Following the album's release, "By the Grace of God" entered the UK Singles Chart at number 179 on the week of November 2, 2013, and peaked on the US Billboard Bubbling Under Hot 100 Singles chart at number 10, which represents the 25 songs which failed to chart on the Billboard Hot 100. It also appeared on the US Hot Digital Songs chart at number 71, where it stayed for only one week. It also entered the South Korea Gaon International Chart at number 77 with 2,104 units sold, and appeared at number 70 on the Canadian Digital Song Sales chart.

== Live performances ==
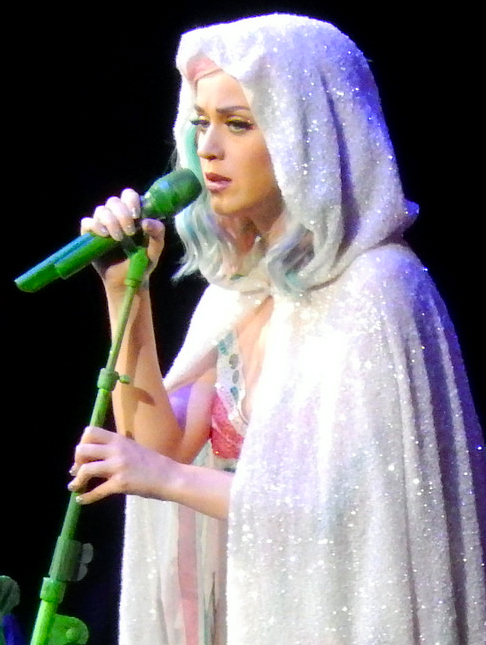
Perry performing "By the Grace of God" on her Prismatic World Tour

"By the Grace of God" was debuted during Perry's headlining set at the Roundhouse in London, England for her Apple Music Festival, held on September 30, 2013. Once she finished singing, Perry thanked her fans for "letting [her] stay". On October 22, 2013, Perry held a release party for Prism where she performed "By the Grace of God" along with the other songs from Prism. Tiffany Lee from Yahoo! Music wrote that Perry's renditions of "Unconditionally" and "By the Grace of God" "shone like lights through a prism in their acoustic setting". The song was included as part of the setlist on the Prismatic World Tour.

Perry performed the song at the 57th Annual Grammy Awards which were held on February 8, 2015. The performance was in support of domestic violence and sexual assault victims. Before she appeared on stage, a prerecorded video message from U.S. President Barack Obama was screened, which featured him encouraging musicians to support the "#ItsOnUs" sexual assault campaign. Then, domestic violence victim Brooke Axtell delivered a brief speech about her story. During the performance, Perry was clothed in a white dress, while shadows danced behind her. MTV's John Walker labelled it as her most "powerful performance yet", while Arienne Thompson of USA Today wrote that it was "powerful and subdued" compared to the "flamboyant and playful" sets Perry is known for.

Perry performed the song on June 22, 2018, at her Witness: The Tour show at Manchester Arena in Manchester, England in tribute to the victims who died in the Manchester Arena bombing.

Perry performed the song as medley with "Still Need You" on May 21, 2023, at the season 21 finale of American Idol, with contestant Haven Madison.

== Credits and personnel ==
Credits adapted from the liner notes of Prism, Capitol Records.

=== Recording locations ===
- Recorded at Rocket Carousel Studios in Los Angeles, California.
- Mixed at MixStar Studios in Virginia Beach, Virginia.

=== Personnel ===
- Katy Perry – backing vocals, lead vocals, songwriting, production, vocal production
- Greg Wells – songwriting, production, drums, piano, synths, and programming
- Serban Ghenea – mixing
- John Hanes – mixing engineer

== Charts ==
Chart performance for "By the Grace of God"
Chart (2013)	Peak position
Canada Digital Song Sales (Billboard)	70
South Korea (Gaon Chart)	77
UK Singles (OCC)	179
US Bubbling Under Hot 100 (Billboard)	10
US Digital Song Sales (Billboard)	71
