= Prism (Katy Perry album) =

Studio album by Katy Perry
- Released: October 18, 2013
- Recorded: 2012–2013
- Studios: Luke's in the Boo (Malibu, California); Playback (Santa Barbara, California); MXM (Stockholm, Sweden); Secret Garden (Montecito, California); Conway (Hollywood); Apmamman (Stockholm, Sweden); Rocket Carousel (Los Angeles)
- Genre: Pop
- Length: 48:39
- Label: Capitol
- Producers: Max Martin; Dr. Luke; Katy Perry; Cirkut; Klas Åhlund; Stargate; Benny Blanco; Bloodshy; Greg Kurstin; Greg Wells

Katy Perry chronology
Teenage Dream: The Complete Confection (2012)	Prism (2013)	Witness (2017)

Singles from Prism
- 1. "Roar" Released: August 10, 2013; 2. "Unconditionally" Released: October 16, 2013; 3. "Dark Horse" Released: December 17, 2013; 4. "Birthday" Released: April 21, 2014; 5. "This Is How We Do" Released: July 31, 2014

Prism is the fourth studio album by American singer Katy Perry. It was released by Capitol Records on October 18, 2013. Although the album was initially planned to be "darker" than her previous material, Prism ultimately became a prominently dance-inspired record. Perry worked with several past collaborators, while enlisting new producers and guest vocals. Perry partially handled production with Dr. Luke, Max Martin, Stargate, Benny Blanco, Greg Wells, Cirkut, and others. The album includes a guest appearance from Juicy J of Three 6 Mafia. Much of Prism revolves around the themes of living in the present, relationships, and self-empowerment. The album received generally positive reviews; critics praised its lyrics for being more "mature" and personal, while others considered Prism more formulaic than her previous work.

Prism charted at number one in Australia, Canada, Ireland, New Zealand, Scotland, the United Kingdom, and the United States. It became Perry's fastest-selling album in the US, and the second-best-selling album in Australia in 2013. The International Federation of the Phonographic Industry (IFPI) reported that Prism was the sixth best-selling album in the world in 2013, the best-selling album in the world in 2013 released by a woman, and labeled Perry "a global phenomenon." It has sold more than eight million copies worldwide and received multi-Platinum certifications in Australia, Austria, Canada, Denmark, Finland, France, India, Indonesia, Mexico, New Zealand, Norway, the Philippines, Poland, and the US. Prism was also nominated for Best Pop Vocal Album at the 57th Annual Grammy Awards.

"Roar" was released on August 10, 2013, as the album's lead single and topped the US Billboard Hot 100. A second single, "Unconditionally", debuted on October 16, 2013, and reached the top 10 in Italy. "Dark Horse" followed as the album's third single three months later on December 17, 2013, and reached number one in the United States. "Birthday" and "This Is How We Do" were the fourth and fifth singles, respectively. The track "Walking on Air" was also released as a promotional single. Prism was promoted further through the Prismatic World Tour. A concert from the tour was eventually released as The Prismatic World Tour Live in 2015.

== Background ==
I've been thinking about my future and what the next move is in terms of what I need to do. I think it would be pretty stupid to try and redo [Teenage Dream] that had all of this success. Maybe it's time to do something that's different that can't be compared. I just feel like I'm going to be criticized regardless of what I do next, so I might as well do something that I feel really passionate about.

— Perry on Prism

After concluding her California Dreams Tour, Perry stated that she intended to "live a little" before recording any new material that was "worth listening to". When ex-husband Russell Brand left her on December 30, 2011, she felt devastated and contemplated suicide. Perry revealed to Vogue in June 2012 that she planned to record a "darker" album than her previous records. She stated: "It was inevitable, after what I went through. If I had a time machine and could go back in time, I would. But I can't, so, you'll discover another part of me." To Interview, she mentioned that she aspired to include a more acoustic vibe to the record.

Perry also said that her music would be getting "real fucking dark" and "shoegazing", though she also stated that her fans would be able to relate to it. "I imagine that maybe my next record would be a little bit more of an artistic venture," she said. "Not that I'm going to self-sabotage either and be like, 'I'm going to make a crazy record that nobody really understands.'" That November, she told Billboard about her plans for the album, saying she had already envisioned several aspects of it. Perry told the magazine that she already had songs and ideas, and knew the type of record she would make next. She also said that although she had not started recording yet, she already knew how the artwork, coloring and tone of the album would turn out. Perry further detailed: "I have to let the music take shape first. I even know what type of tour I'm doing next. I'll be very pleased if the vision I have in my head becomes a reality. But I have to honor the music."

== Recording ==
Development of Prism began while Perry was on the California Dreams Tour. She began with a process she deemed "slow cooking", in which she recorded random "fragments of ideas" into her mobile phone's dictaphone application. A member of Direct Management Group, Ngoc Hoang, then transcribed the audio files and placed them into what Perry described as a "treasure chest"; Perry consulted this material later during the album's recording sessions. Although Perry officially started recording the album in November 2012, accompanied by Greg Wells and Greg Kurstin, she noted that she was still in a "dark place", and that she had not "let the light in". The sessions began again in March 2013, following a trip to Madagascar which Perry credited as having "put [her] priorities in perspective", leading her to "do more work on [her]self". Perry also viewed a video made by Eckhart Tolle, which discusses loss. She commented: "When you lose something, all your foundations crumble—but that also leaves a big hole that's open for something great to come through."

Once she felt prepared to record again, she reunited with her team from Teenage Dream—Dr. Luke, Bonnie McKee, and Cirkut—in Perry's hometown of Santa Barbara, California, where they spent a month recording at Playback Recording Studio. She then went to Stockholm, where she worked with Scandinavian record producer Max Martin to do what Perry called "put[ting] the ice on the cake". She also recruited other collaborators, such as Norwegian team Stargate, Bloodshy, Benny Blanco, Jonatha Brooke and Sia. By April 2013, recording for the album was halfway complete, and Perry described to the ASCAP how she worked with these collaborators. She said Wells allowed her to "vomit words"; with Martin, she shaped the songs' melodies; Luke mostly helmed the production, and she worked with "topline and melody". Perry described writing sessions with McKee as "emotional abuse", adding that they argue over the "best lyric", as if they were fighting in a boxing ring. McKee, who wrote four songs for Prism, spoke with MTV about the album, describing it as "a little bit more grown up" and "interesting".

== Composition ==
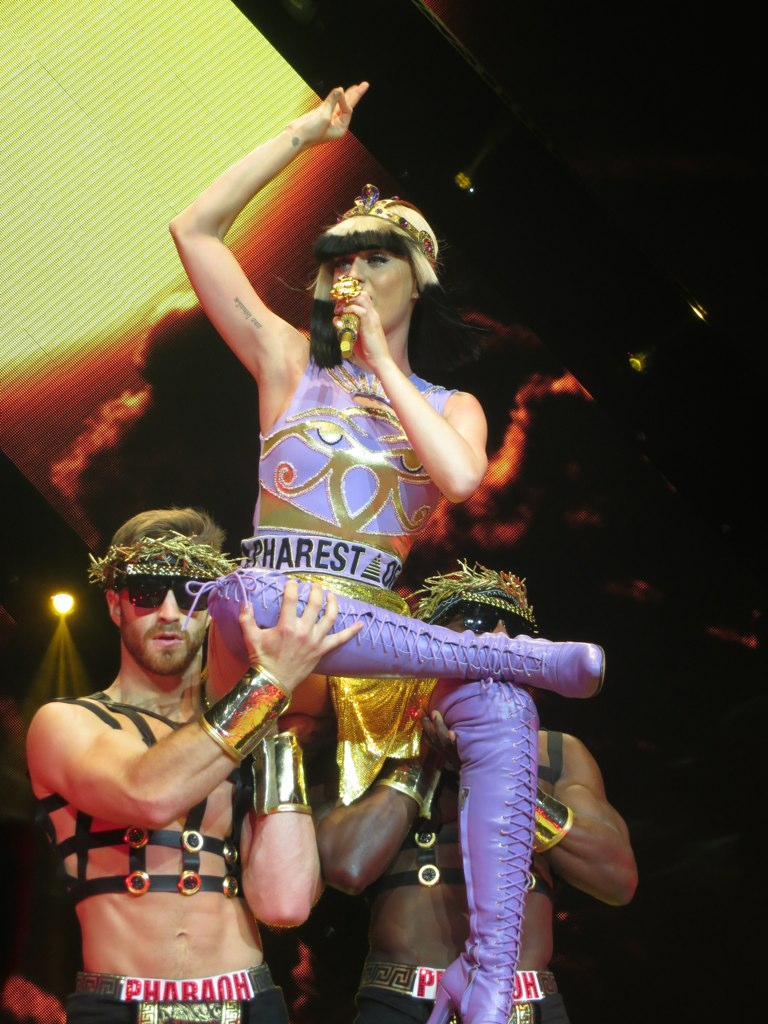
Perry performing the album's second track, "Legendary Lovers", at the Prismatic World Tour

A pop album, Prism opens with "Roar", which contains elements of arena rock and glam rock, and lyrically is an empowerment anthem. Comparisons were established between "Roar" and "Brave" by Sara Bareilles. "Legendary Lovers", a bhangra-based song, deals with the concepts of karma and infinity. "Birthday" was described by Perry as her own attempt at "writing something Mariah Carey would have put on her first record". Musically, it is a "fluffy" pop song that is primarily styled in the genre of disco. "Walking on Air", the album's second promotional single, is an early 1990s-inspired deep house-Eurodance-disco song, inspired heavily by CeCe Peniston and Crystal Waters. It was produced by Klas Åhlund and Max Martin. "Unconditionally", Perry's personal favorite song on the album and second official single, is a "soaring" power ballad with an "epic chorus". Jason Lipshutz from Billboard noted that the song includes a "woodblock percussion" as well as "a dramatic bass line" and deemed it the album's "most mature offering". Furthermore, he called it "an ode to love that looks past all flaws" and stated that the song serves as a "compellingly grounded predicate" to the title track from Teenage Dream. Perry described the song as being about unconditional love that could come in all forms, including those from relationships, from parent to child and from sibling to sibling.

"Dark Horse" is a song with strong influences from trap, grime, hip hop, and "Southern rap-techno mashup" styles. "This Is How We Do", produced by Max Martin and Klas Ahlund, was described as a possible "song of summer" for 2014. Shirley Halperin from The Hollywood Reporter described "This Is How We Do" as "a sunny 80s throwback", while Edna Gundersen from USA Today described it as a "buoyant pop blast with hip-hop underpinnings" and praised the song's recurring refrain ("It's no big deal!"). James Montgomery from MTV News called the song a "cocksure, club-ready banger". With "Double Rainbow", produced by Greg Kurstin and co-writer Sia, Perry was able to "dump pent-up emotions" and "get things off her chest". The song was described as a "massive ballad". Lipshutz deemed it a "breathy love track" with a "powerful chorus that explodes upon impact" with lyrics that include "One man's trash is another man's treasure / so if it's up to me, I'm gonna keep you forever". He added that "Kurstin brings the pop sensibility he's flashed with artists like Kelly Clarkson and P!nk, while Sia's presence connects this sleek, shimmering pop track to [her David Guetta collaboration] 'Titanium'". Elijah Sarkesian felt that "Some of Katy's finest vocals of the album are on this song".

Perry described "Love Me" as a song "about loving yourself the way you want to be loved". Gundersen called it "irresistibly catchy and energetic". The song was produced by Bloodshy. Sarkesian called it "an interesting mix – the lyrics are dark, but the music is very dance-centric. At the very least, it'll do well in clubs". Montgomery stated that "Love Me" and "International Smile" both "seem destined for the dance floors". The latter was inspired by Perry's friend Mia Moretti, and was compared to the songs on Perry's previous album. Lipshutz called it a "straightforward pop-rock offering" and described its guitar hook as "kicky", adding that the song also includes a "Melting Daft Punk-esque vocoder breakdown". Halperin stated that in the song, Perry sings the "hooky" line: "Please fasten your seat belts and make sure your champagne glasses are empty".

Halperin described "This Moment" and "Ghost" as "mid-tempo ballads that are closest in DNA to Perry's previous smashes". Perry stated that she was inspired to write "This Moment" after she heard the audio book of Eckhart Tolle's The Power of Now; the song's lyrics talk about "living in the present"; with Perry "add[ing] a romantic spin" to it. Gary Trust described "Ghost" as a "mesmerizing ballad", while Gundersen described it as "powerful, dark, and haunting". Lipshutz felt that "Ghost" and "By the Grace of God" contain the album's "most somber moments". While talking about each Prism track, Perry mentioned that "By the Grace of God" was the first song she wrote and recorded for the album back in November 2012 while she was in her "dark" phase. Jody Rosen from Vulture described the bonus track "Spiritual" as an inspirational song. Kevin Fallon of The Daily Beast described "It Takes Two" as a "sweeping ballad" which allowed Perry to "show off a full-throated belt that so many of her more bubbly tracks mask". In "Choose Your Battles", Perry "pounds her chest and spews venom at the man she cannot understand".

== Release and promotion ==
=== Promotion and countdown singles ===
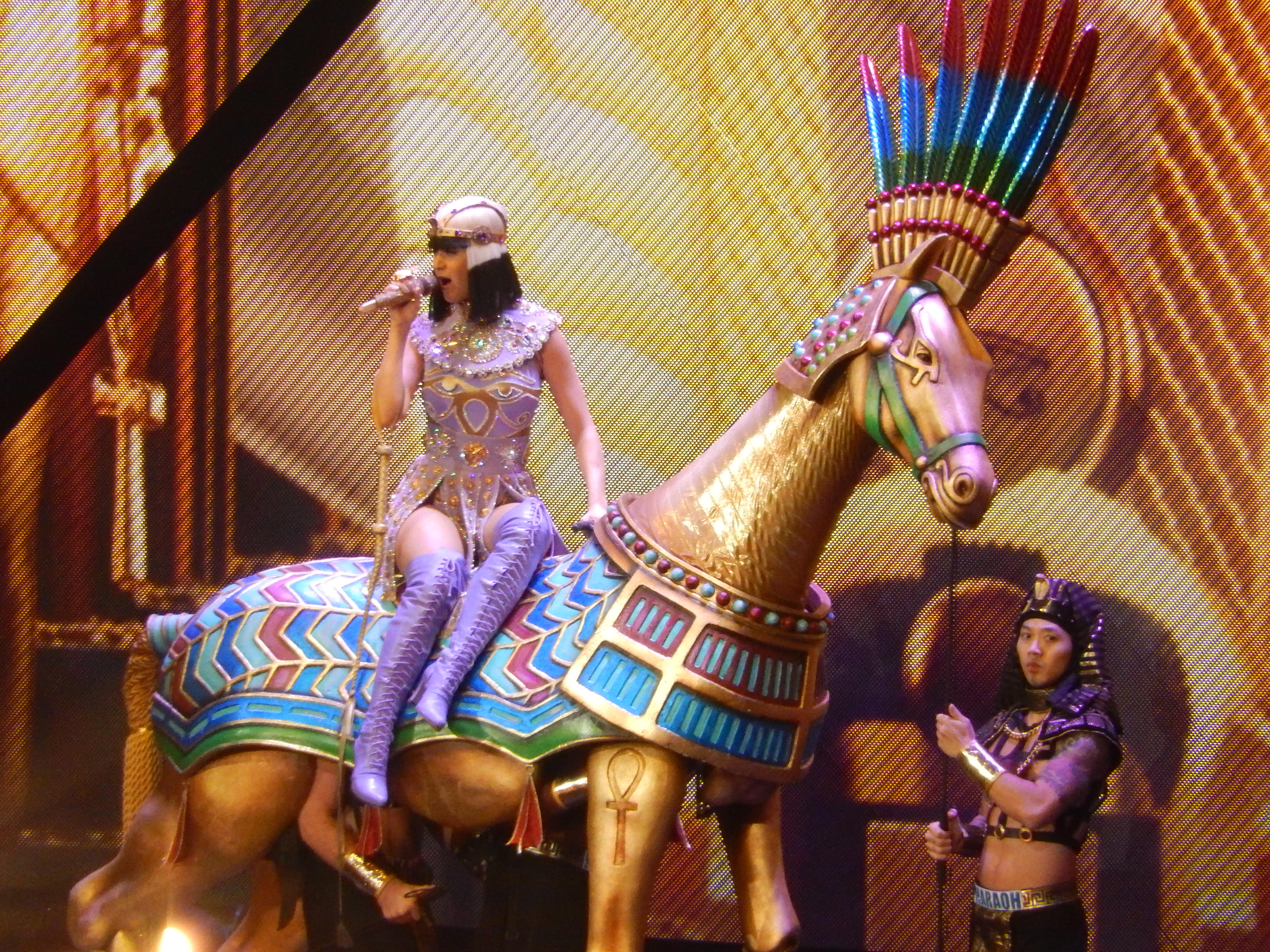
Perry performing "Dark Horse" during The Prismatic World Tour in New Jersey on July 11, 2014

On July 29, 2013, a golden truck driving in Los Angeles revealed the album's title, Prism, and its October 22, 2013, release date. On August 9, the truck was hit by a drunk driver in Pennsylvania, but no injuries were reported. On August 20, Pepsi revealed a partnership with Perry through which fans were given the opportunity to unlock song titles, lyrics, and snippets from Prism by tweeting the hashtag #KATYNOW. Additionally, Pepsi provided previews of the songs "Dark Horse" and "Walking on Air", and fans could vote on which song would be released early on music platforms. The former song was declared the winner and was released on iTunes on September 17, 2013. It debuted at number 17 on the US Billboard Hot 100 and at number ten on the New Zealand Singles Chart. Perry first performed "Dark Horse" three days later at the iHeartRadio Music Festival.

Three listening parties for Prism were held: the first took place in New York on September 5, 2013, for an audience of 100 industry insiders and journalists, where twelve tracks were played. A second Prism listening party took place the next day in Atlanta. "Walking on Air" was released as the second promotional single on September 30. The song peaked at number 34 on the Billboard Hot 100 and at number 80 in the United Kingdom.

Prism was released on October 18, 2013. Ryan McGinley shot its album cover, which was unveiled on September 6, 2013, on a Jumbotron during Good Morning America. For the deluxe edition, 300,000 copies with an iridescent digipak package were printed and came with the album's logo printed onto seed paper.

=== Prismatic World Tour ===
Perry began the Prismatic World Tour on May 7, 2014, at the Odyssey Arena in Belfast, Northern Ireland. The first leg of the tour also featured performances in Scotland and England that month. The second leg was announced on January 15, 2014, with concerts in Canada, Mexico, and the United States. The leg ran from June to October 2014.

== Singles ==
"Roar" was sent to mainstream radio stations on August 10, 2013, as the album's lead single, and its digital release followed two days later. It received mixed-to-positive commentary from music critics, who commended its "easy" and "poppy" beat, while others were ambivalent toward its clichéd lyrics. Commercially, it was a success, topping the Billboard Hot 100 and charts in Australia, Canada, New Zealand, and the United Kingdom. It became Australia's best performing song of 2013 with 560,000 copies sold by the end of the year and spending nine weeks atop the nation's charts. The song was nominated for the Song of the Year and the Best Pop Solo Performance awards at the 56th Annual Grammy Awards.

"Unconditionally" was released as the album's second single on October 16, 2013. It received generally favorable reviews from critics, who praised it as "soaring" and "effortless". A lyric video for the song was released two days after its debut, and its official music video was released on November 19, 2013. To promote the single, Perry performed on various occasions, including a geisha-themed performance of it on the 2013 American Music Awards, which attracted negative press, controversy, and accusations of cultural appropriation. "Unconditionally" peaked at number 14 on the Billboard Hot 100 and charted moderately worldwide, reaching the top 30 in the singles charts of Canada and Germany and the Top 10 in Italy.

"Dark Horse" was released on December 17, 2013, as the album's third official single. It had previously been released as the album's first promotional single exactly three months before its single release. The following week, the song leaped to number four due to topping the Hot Digital Songs, selling 243,000 copies. With "Dark Horse" topping the Hot Digital Songs chart, it became Perry's tenth digital number-one single. The song topped the Billboard Hot 100 chart on January 29, 2014, becoming Perry's ninth number-one single in the United States. It was nominated for Best Pop Duo/Group Performance at the 57th Annual Grammy Awards.

On April 3, 2014, "Birthday" was announced as the album's fourth official single. It debuted at number 91 on the Billboard Hot 100 and was sent to mainstream radio in the U.S. on April 21, 2014. The single peaked at number 17 in the US, becoming her 15th song to reach the top 20 in the nation.

"This Is How We Do" was released as the fifth official single from the album. A lyric video of the song was released on July 24, 2014. One week later, its official music video premiered and the track was sent to French radio on the same day. The song debuted at number 88 on the Billboard Hot 100 on August 9, 2014, and peaked at number 24.

== Critical reception ==
Professional ratings
Aggregate scores
Source	Rating
AnyDecentMusic?	5.8/10
Metacritic	61/100
Review scores
Source	Rating
AllMusic	3.5/5 stars
The A.V. Club	C+
Chicago Tribune	2/4 stars
Consequence	3.5/5 stars
Entertainment Weekly	B+
The Guardian	3/5 stars
Los Angeles Times	3/4 stars
Rolling Stone	3/5 stars
Slant Magazine	3/5 stars
Spin	5/10

Upon its release, Prism received generally favorable reviews from music critics. On Metacritic, it has a score of 61 out of 100, based on 26 reviews. Jon Dolan from Rolling Stone awarded the album three out of five stars, writing that "Perry and her longtime collaborators Dr. Luke and Max Martin often go for a darker, moodier intimacy à la high-end Swedish divas Robyn and Lykke Li. Perry has always done a great job of letting us know she's in on the joke of pop stardom. Sadly, she doesn't always bring that same sense of humor and self-awareness to the joke of pop-star introspection. The album's raft of ripe-lotus ballads is larded with Alanis-ian poesy she can't pull off". Giving the album a B+ rating, Nick Catucci from Entertainment Weekly stated that "Katy's superpower, now more than ever, is minting songs so relatable that their insights quickly scale up to inspirational." He also added that "now she grasps that she's making the mainstream, not just swimming in it".

Helen Brown from The Daily Telegraph gave the album five out of five stars, stating Perry "sounds like a woman, and an artist, who's finally found herself" and praised the "vulnerability" of the album. Stephen Thomas Erlewine from AllMusic, Alexis Petridis from The Guardian, and Sal Cinquemani from Slant Magazine all also gave the album three out of five stars. Erlewine dubbed Prism "a tighter, cleaner record than its predecessors". Petridis called it "Katy Perry's most spiritual album to date". Mesfin Fekadu from ABC News deemed the tracks "likable", but felt the album lacked "some of the fiery fierceness and excitement that dominated Teenage Dream". James Reed from The Boston Globe wrote Perry "always seemed like the pop star who knows precisely what she does best" and called the album "an unabashedly fun listen". Chris Bosman from Consequence gave the album three and a half out of five stars, calling Perry "a champion of choruses". Greg Kot from Chicago Tribune gave the album 2 out of 4 stars, commenting "Though not exactly spiritual, Prism does come off as a more serious—if no less formulaic—album than its predecessor". Marah Eakin from The A.V. Club gave the album a C+, commenting "A lot of Prism is simply forgettable", though praised the tracks "Roar", "Birthday", and "This Is How We Do". Rob Harvilla from Spin gave the album a 5/10 rating, and felt some of the material was not "all that desirable".

Elysa Gardner from USA Today gave the album a three-out-of-four rating and found the album to be "genuine and endearing". Trent Wolbe from The Verge gave an overall 4/4 rating and praised Perry's ability to "wrapping hyper-specific emotions into a new format that everyone can relate to". He particularly praised the tracks "International Smile" and "Birthday", declaring the chorus of "Birthday" to be "fucking perfect". Jody Rosen from Vulture was disappointed with every track on the album except for "Roar". Randall Roberts of Los Angeles Times gave the album a three-out-of-four rating, calling it "a shimmering, dynamic, heavy-duty modern pop album".

== Accolades ==
=== Awards and nominations ===
Name of award, year listed, category, and result
Award	Year	Category	Result	Ref.
American Music Awards	2014	Favorite Pop/Rock Album	Nominated	
ARIA Number One Chart Awards	2014	Number One Album	Won	
Digital Spy Reader Awards	2014	Best Album	Won	
Grammy Awards	2014	Best Pop Vocal Album	Nominated	
Juno Awards	2014	International Album of the Year	Nominated	
LOS40 Music Awards	2014	Best International Album	Nominated	
The Official Specialist Number One Awards (Note: The Specialist Number One Awards were launched in January 2021. These awards recognize all number one albums and singles that have reached the top of any OCC chart, excluding the Official Singles and Official Albums charts, for any prior years.)	2014	Number One Album Downloads	Won	
The Official Specialist Number One Awards	2014	Number One Physical Albums	Won	
Rockol Awards	2014	Best International Album	Won	
TeleHit Awards	2014	Best Female Pop Album	Won	

=== Critic rankings and listicles ===
Name of publication, year listed, name of listicle, and result
Publication	Year	Listicle	Result	Ref.
The Guardian	2013	Best Albums of the Year	Placed	
MusicOMH	2013	Best Albums of the Year	95th	
Radio.com	2013	Best Albums of the Year	9th	

== Commercial performance ==
=== Worldwide and digital platforms ===
Prism sold 453,000 copies worldwide in its first week of release. The International Federation of the Phonographic Industry (IFPI) reported that Prism was the best-selling album released by a woman in 2013 and ranked as the sixth best-selling album overall that year. The IFPI called Perry "a global phenomenon." The record was also the 26th best-selling album worldwide in 2014. Prism has sold more than eight million copies worldwide as of October 2015.

On Spotify, Prism has reached more than a billion streams as of September 2021. With "Roar" and "Dark Horse", Prism became the first studio album to have two songs from its tracklist to have more than four billion views on YouTube.

=== The Americas ===
In the United States, Prism debuted at number one on the Billboard 200, becoming her second consecutive number one album in the country. The album sold 286,000 copies in its first week. Prism earned the largest first-week sales total by a female artist for 2013, surpassing Miley Cyrus' Bangerz (270,000 copies). However, this mark was surpassed by Beyoncé's self-titled album (617,213 digital copies), released in December 2013. At the time of its release, Prism had the fourth-highest first-week sales of the year for a pop record, trailing behind Daft Punk's May 2013 album Random Access Memories, which sold 339,000 copies, and Justin Timberlake's The 20/20 Experience, which debuted to 968,000 copies and its follow-up, The 20/20 Experience – 2 of 2, which debuted to just 350,000 copies. The first week's sales also marked Perry's highest weekly sales, with her previous album Teenage Dream selling 192,000 copies in its first week in August 2010. Prism has the highest first-week sales for a female pop artist since Madonna's twelfth studio album, MDNA. The album sold 92,000 copies during its second week of availability, falling to number two on the Billboard 200. This represented the smallest sales dip for a number one album in the US since the August 2013 release of The Civil Wars. Prism became Perry's second-longest charting album, remaining on the Billboard 200 for 102 weeks. According to Nielsen Music, the album has sold 1.74 million copies in the US as of August 2020. It was later certified five-times Platinum by the Recording Industry Association of America (RIAA) for shifting five million album-equivalent units in the country. In Canada, Prism debuted atop the Billboard Canadian Album Chart for the week ending November 9, 2013. It stayed on the chart for a total of 35 weeks and was certified eight-times Platinum by Music Canada in September 2024 for sales exceeding 640,000 units. Elsewhere, Prism has been certified four-times Platinum+Gold in Mexico and two-times Platinum in Brazil.

=== Asia-Pacific ===
In Australia, Prism debuted at number one on the ARIA Albums Chart, giving Perry her second chart-topping album in the country after Teenage Dream. It was the nation's 688th album to top its charts overall and 342nd to enter at the summit. With only three months of availability, Prism became the second-best-selling album of 2013 in Australia, with 179,000 copies sold. The album was also the 14th best-selling album of the 2010s in the country and has been certified six-times Platinum by the Australian Recording Industry Association (ARIA). In New Zealand, Prism also debuted at number one during the week ending November 7, 2013. The album was certified six-times Platinum by Recorded Music NZ in May 2026. Prism has become one of the best-performing albums on both the Australian and New Zealand album charts since 1988. In South Korea, all 13 tracks from Prism, with an additional three from the deluxe edition, made it onto the Gaon International Digital Chart for the week ending October 26, 2013. The album has been certified four-times Platinum in the Philippines and two-times Platinum in India and Indonesia.

=== Europe ===
Prism debuted atop the UK Albums Chart, giving Perry her second number-one album after Teenage Dream in 2010. According to the Official Charts, Prism outsold the number two placer on the chart, James Blunt's Moon Landing, by almost 12,000 copies. The album charted for a total of 53 weeks and was later certified Platinum by the British Phonographic Industry (BPI). As of May 2026, it has sold 574,224 copies in the UK. Prism also debuted at number one in Ireland and Scotland, while reaching the top five in Austria, Belgium (Flanders), Denmark, France, Germany, Greece, Italy, the Netherlands, Norway, Spain, Sweden, and Switzerland. The album has been certified five-times Platinum in Norway, three-times Platinum in Austria, and two-times Platinum in Denmark and Poland.

== Track listing ==
Credits adapted from the liner notes of Prism.

Standard edition
No.	Title	Writer(s)	Producer(s)	Length
1.	"Roar"	Katy Perry; Lukasz Gottwald; Max Martin; Bonnie McKee; Henry Walter	Dr. Luke; Martin; Cirkut	3:43
2.	"Legendary Lovers"	Perry; Gottwald; Martin; McKee; Walter	Dr. Luke; Martin; Cirkut	3:44
3.	"Birthday"	Perry; Gottwald; Martin; McKee; Walter	Dr. Luke; Martin; Cirkut	3:35
4.	"Walking on Air"	Perry; Klas Åhlund; Martin; Adam Baptiste; Camela Leierth	Åhlund; Martin	3:42
5.	"Unconditionally"	Perry; Gottwald; Martin; Walter	Dr. Luke; Martin; Cirkut	3:48
6.	"Dark Horse" (featuring Juicy J)	Perry; Jordan Houston; Gottwald; Sarah Theresa Hudson; Martin; Walter	Dr. Luke; Martin; Cirkut	3:35
7.	"This Is How We Do"	Perry; Åhlund; Martin	Åhlund; Martin	3:24
8.	"International Smile"	Perry; Gottwald; Martin; Walter	Dr. Luke; Martin; Cirkut	3:47
9.	"Ghost"	Perry; Gottwald; Martin; McKee; Walter	Dr. Luke; Martin; Cirkut	3:23
10.	"Love Me"	Perry; Martin; Christian "Bloodshy" Karlsson; Vincent Pontare; Magnus Lidehäll	Bloodshy	3:52
11.	"This Moment"	Perry; Tor Erik Hermansen; Mikkel Storleer Eriksen; Benjamin Levin	Stargate; Benny Blanco	3:46
12.	"Double Rainbow"	Perry; Sia Furler; Greg Kurstin	Kurstin	3:51
13.	"By the Grace of God"	Perry; Greg Wells	Wells; Perry	4:27
Total length:				48:39

Deluxe edition
No.	Title	Writer(s)	Producer(s)	Length
14.	"Spiritual"	Perry; Kurstin; John Mayer	Kurstin	4:35
15.	"It Takes Two"	Perry; Hermansen; Eriksen; Levin; Emeli Sandé	Stargate; Blanco	3:54
16.	"Choose Your Battles"	Perry; Jonatha Brooke; Wells	Wells; Perry	4:27
Total length:				61:35

=== Notes ===
- Japan deluxe edition includes the Cazzette Remix and instrumental version of "Roar" as bonus tracks, as well a DVD, which features the music, lyric and five teaser videos of "Roar".
- Japan Trip Special Edition includes the Johnson Somerset Remix of "Roar" and Country Club Martini Crew Remix of "Unconditionally", as well as a DVD which features the making of the music video of "Roar", and the music video and making of the music video of "Unconditionally".

== Personnel ==
Credits adapted from the liner notes.

- Klas Åhlund – production, programming
- Cory Bice – assistant
- Tim Blacksmith – management
- Ron Blake – saxophone
- Benny Blanco – instrumentation, production, programming
- Delbert Bowers – assistant
- Peter Carlsson – engineer
- Cirkut – instrumentation, production, programming
- Bradford Cobb – management
- Danny D. – management
- Sabina Ddumba – background vocals
- Dr. Luke – coral sitar, executive producer, instrumentation, production, programming
- Eric Eylands – assistant
- Rachael Findlen – assistant
- Justin Fox – assistant recording engineer
- Alex Foster – saxophone
- Mike Foster – engineer
- Chris Galland – assistant
- Earl Gardner – trumpet
- Chris Gehringer – mastering
- Şerban Ghenea – mixing
- Clint Gibbs – engineer
- John Hanes – engineer
- Ngoc Hoàng – management
- Sam Holland – engineer
- Ian Mcgregor – engineer
- Michael Ilbert – engineer
- Ava James – vocals
- Steven Jensen – management
- Juicy J – featured artist, vocals
- Aditya Kalyanpur – tabla
- Christian Karlsson – engineer, instrumentation, production, programming
- Martin Kirkup – management
- Greg Kurstin – engineer, guitar, keyboards, production, programming
- Ronobit Lahiri – sitar
- Tucker Bodine – engineer
- Andrew Luftman – production co-ordination
- Magnus – engineer, instrumentation, programming
- Manny Marroquin – mixing
- Max Martin – executive producer, instrumentation, production, programming, background vocals
- John Mayer – guitar
- Dan McCarroll – A&R
- Ryan McGinley – photography
- Mogollon – art direction, design
- Dave O'Donnell – horn engineer
- Alex Pasco – engineer
- Katy Perry – executive producer, primary artist, production, lead vocals, background vocals
- Lenny Pickett – horn arrangements, saxophone
- Vincent Pontare – engineer, instrumentation, programming
- Irene Richter – production co-ordination
- Saturday Night Live Band – main personnel
- Chris Sclafani – assistant
- Gingger Shankar – double violin
- Jesse Shatkin – engineer
- Stargate – instrumentation, production, programming, composition, engineering
- Tensta Gospel Choir – background vocals
- Steve Turre – trombone
- Greg Wells – drums, piano, production, programming, synthesizer
- Steven Wolf – drums
- Scott "Yarmov" Yarmovsky – production co-ordination
- Kenta Yonesaka – assistant

== Charts ==
=== Weekly charts ===
Chart (2013–15)	Peak position
Australian Albums (ARIA)	1
Austrian Albums (Ö3 Austria)	3
Belgian Albums (Ultratop Flanders)	5
Belgian Albums (Ultratop Wallonia)	7
Canadian Albums (Billboard)	1
Chinese Albums (Sino Chart)	3
Croatian International Albums (HDU)	5
Czech Albums (ČNS IFPI)	11
Danish Albums (Hitlisten)	4
Dutch Albums (Album Top 100)	4
French Albums (SNEP)	4
Finnish Albums (Suomen virallinen lista)	15
German Albums (Offizielle Top 100)	4
Greek Albums (IFPI)	5
Hungarian Albums (MAHASZ)	10
Irish Albums (IRMA)	1
Italian Albums (FIMI)	5
Japanese Albums (Oricon)	5
Mexican Albums (AMPROFON)	2
New Zealand Albums (RMNZ)	1
Norwegian Albums (VG-lista)	3
Polish Albums (ZPAV)	34
Portuguese Albums (AFP)	10
Scottish Albums (Official Charts)	1
South African Albums (RSG)	7
South Korean Albums (Gaon)	21
South Korean Albums International (Gaon)	4
Spanish Albums (Promusicae)	3
Swedish Albums (Sverigetopplistan)	3
Swiss Albums (Schweizer Hitparade)	2
Taiwan International Albums (G-Music)	1
UK Albums (Official Charts)	1
US Billboard 200	1

Chart (2026)	Peak position
Slovak Albums (ČNS IFPI)	66

=== Monthly charts ===
Chart (2013)	Peak position
South Korean Albums (Gaon)	56
Uruguayan Albums (CUD)	18

=== Year-end charts ===
Chart (2013)	Position
Australian Albums (ARIA)	2
Belgian Albums (Ultratop Flanders)	101
Belgian Albums (Ultratop Wallonia)	120
Canadian Albums (Billboard)	29
Danish Albums (Hitlisten)	82
Dutch Albums (Album Top 100)	86
French Albums (SNEP)	70
Germany (Official German Charts)	94
Irish Albums (IRMA)	18
Italian Albums (FIMI)	69
Mexican Albums (AMPROFON)	43
New Zealand Albums (RMNZ)	8
Swedish Albums (Sverigetopplistan)	53
Swiss Albums (Schweizer Hitparade)	77
UK Albums (Official Charts)	28
US Billboard 200	49
Worldwide Albums (IFPI)	6

Chart (2014)	Position
Australian Albums (ARIA)	7
Austrian Albums (Ö3 Austria)	73
Canadian Albums (Billboard)	5
Dutch Albums (Album Top 100)	70
French Albums (SNEP)	94
Italian Albums (FIMI)	65
Mexican Albums (AMPROFON)	40
New Zealand Albums (RMNZ)	11
Swedish Albums (Sverigetopplistan)	11
Swiss Albums (Schweizer Hitparade)	63
UK Albums (Official Charts)	52
US Billboard 200	8
Worldwide Albums (IFPI)	26

Chart (2015)	Position
Australian Albums (ARIA)	54
Swedish Albums (Sverigetopplistan)	61
US Billboard 200	83

=== Decade-end charts ===
Chart (2010–2019)	Position
Australian Albums (ARIA)	14
Norway (VG-lista)	34
US Billboard 200	56

== Certifications and sales ==
Certifications and sales for Prism
Region	Certification	Certified units/sales
Argentina	Platinum	
Australia (ARIA)	6× Platinum	420,000^{‡}
Austria (IFPI Austria)	3× Platinum	45,000^{*}
Brazil (Pro-Música Brasil) Physical	Platinum	40,000^{*}
Brazil (Pro-Música Brasil) Digital	Platinum	60,000^{*}
Canada (Music Canada)	8× Platinum	640,000^{‡}
Chile	Platinum	
China	Gold	
Denmark (IFPI Danmark)	2× Platinum	40,000^{‡}
Finland	4× Platinum	80,000
France (SNEP)	2× Platinum	200,000^{‡}
Germany (BVMI)	Platinum	200,000^{‡}
India (IMI)	3× Platinum	90,000
Indonesia	2× Platinum	20,000
Ireland (IRMA)	Gold	7,500^{^}
Italy (FIMI)	Platinum	50,000^{‡}
Mexico (AMPROFON)	4× Platinum+Gold	270,000^{^}
Netherlands (NVPI)	Platinum	50,000^{^}
New Zealand (RMNZ)	6× Platinum	90,000^{‡}
Norway (IFPI Norway)	5× Platinum	100,000^{‡}
Peru	Platinum	5,000
Philippines	4× Platinum	60,000
Poland (ZPAV)	2× Platinum	40,000^{‡}
Singapore (RIAS)	Platinum	10,000^{*}
South Africa	Platinum	
Sweden (GLF)	Platinum	40,000^{‡}
Switzerland (IFPI Switzerland)	Platinum	20,000^{‡}
United Kingdom (BPI)	Platinum	574,224
United States (RIAA)	5× Platinum	5,000,000^{‡}
Summaries
Worldwide	—	8,000,000
^{*} Sales figures based on certification alone.^{^} Shipments figures based on certification alone.^{‡} Sales+streaming figures based on certification alone.

== See also ==
- Album era
