= Birthday (Katy Perry song) =

2014 song by Katy Perry

Single by Katy Perry

from the album Prism
- Released: April 21, 2014
- Studio: Luke's in the Boo (Malibu, CA); Conway Recording Studios (Los Angeles, CA); Playback Recording Studios (Santa Barbara, CA); MXM Studios (Stockholm, Sweden); Secret Garden Studios (Montecito, CA)
- Genre: Disco
- Length: 3:35
- Label: Capitol
- Songwriters: Katy Perry; Lukasz Gottwald; Max Martin; Bonnie McKee; Henry Walter
- Producers: Dr. Luke; Max Martin; Cirkut

Katy Perry singles chronology
"Dark Horse" (2013)	"Birthday" (2014)	"This Is How We Do" (2014)

Music video
- "Birthday" on YouTube

"Birthday" is a song by American singer Katy Perry from her fourth studio album, Prism (2013). She co-wrote the song with Bonnie McKee and its producers Dr. Luke, Max Martin, and Cirkut. The song was recorded in Studios across California, alongside MXM Studios, based in Stockholm, Sweden. Inspired by Mariah Carey's first album, critics compared "Birthday" to the work of other musicians like Prince and Daft Punk. Through double entendres in the lyrics of "Birthday", Perry makes sexual references while celebrating a partner's birthday. Capitol Records sent the track to mainstream and rhythmic radio on April 21, 2014 as the album's fourth single.

Following the release of Prism, the song entered the single charts of South Korea and France. After being released as an official single, it reached number one on the US Billboard Dance Club Songs chart and the Israeli TV Airplay chart, number three in South Africa, number seven in Canada, number 10 in South Korea, number 17 on the US Billboard Hot 100 chart, and the top 40 in nine additional countries. It would later be certified 3× Platinum by Australian Recording Industry Association (ARIA), 2× Platinum in Music Canada (MC), and Platinum in New Zealand and the United States.

A music video for the track was released on April 24, 2014. Primarily recorded with hidden cameras, it features Perry disguised as five different characters in birthday parties and other celebrations. The makeup effects for Perry were designed and created by Tony Gardner. Perry's portrayal of a Jewish character in the video sparked criticism. The song was also performed at Perry's Prismatic World Tour. Jess Glynne covered the song on BBC Radio 1's Live Lounge, as did Halsey on SiriusXM.

== Production and release ==
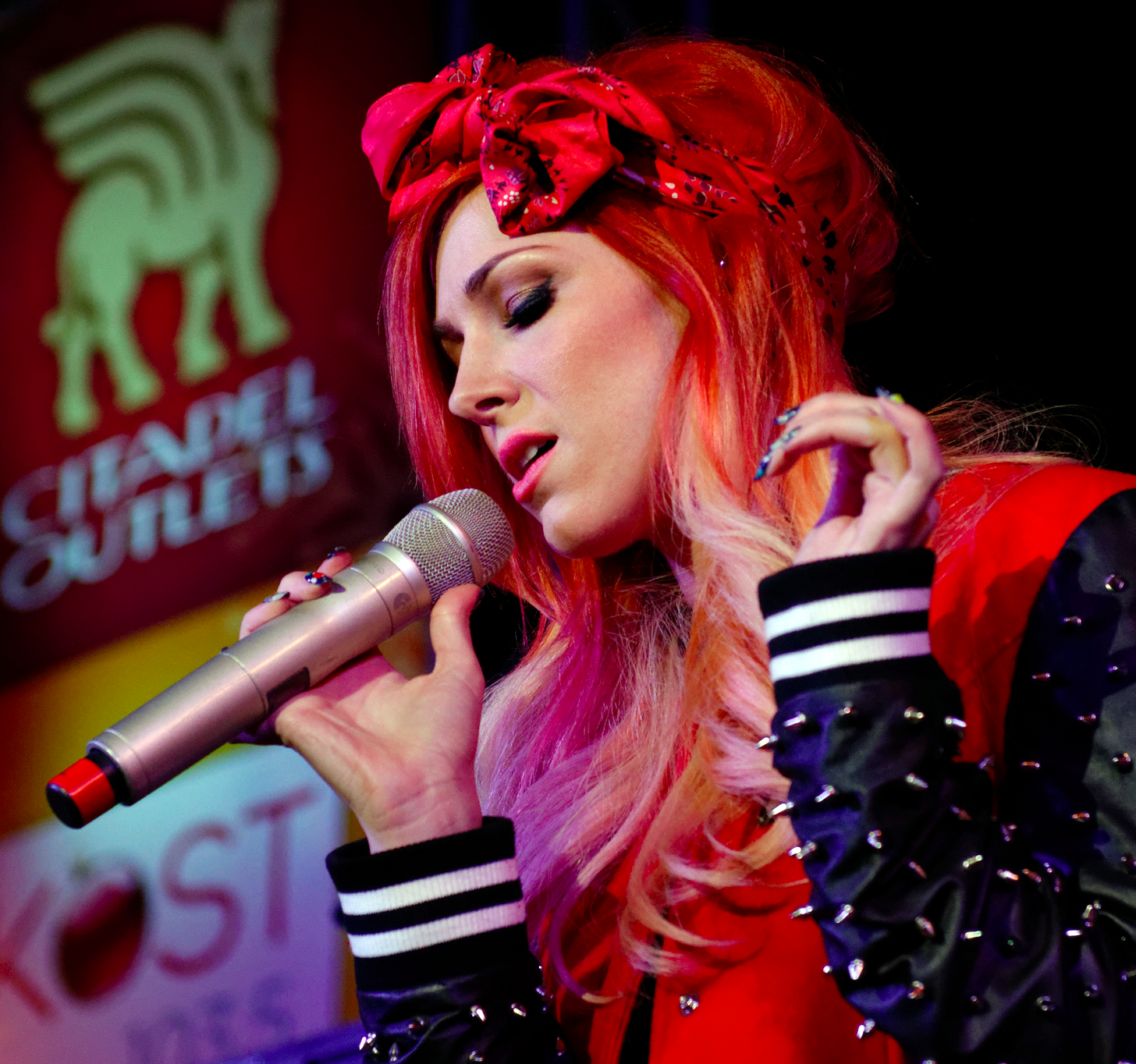
Bonnie McKee (pictured) co-wrote "Birthday".

"Birthday" was written by Perry, Bonnie McKee, Cirkut, Dr. Luke, and Max Martin. The latter three produced the song and contributed to the instrumentation and programmed their respective instruments. The drums were played by Steven Wolf, while the horns were played by the Saturday Night Live Band, arranged by Lenny Pickett and engineered by Dave O'Donnell. Its audio engineering was done by Peter Carlsson, Clint Gibbs, Sam Holland, and Michael Illbert. The track was finally mixed by Serban Ghenea at the MixStar Studios in Virginia Beach, Virginia, accompanied by the mixing engineer, John Hanes. The song itself was recorded at various studios, including Luke's in the Boo in Malibu, California, Conway Recording Studios in Hollywood, California, Playback Recording Studio in Santa Barbara, California, MXM Studios in Stockholm, Sweden and Secret Garden Studios in Montecito, California.

The song leaked online on October 16, 2013, two days prior to the official release of Prism. On April 3, 2014, the singer announced on her Twitter account that "Birthday" would be released as the album's fourth single, posting its cover art as well. The art is based on a photograph, taken during a birthday party circa 1990, in which a blonde Perry and her sister Angela Hudson smile toward the camera; "puffy" letter balloons were "photoshopped" onto the cover to spell out Perry's name. The song title appears in candles over a floral cake. To promote the single, a lyric video for "Birthday" was uploaded onto Perry's Vevo account on April 10, 2014. It depicts a variety of cakes and sweets—among other confections—decorated with the song's lyrics and concludes with Perry lighting the last candle of a cake.

== Composition ==
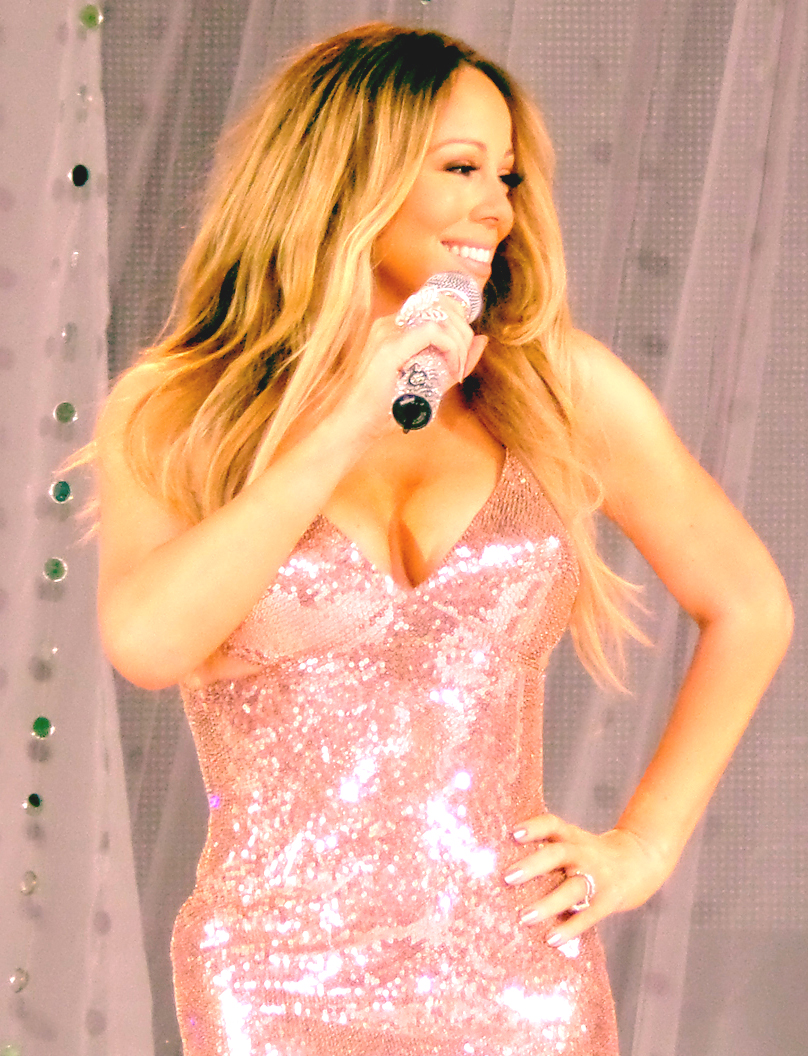
Mariah Carey (pictured) inspired "Birthday".

At the length of three minutes and thirty-five seconds (3:35), "Birthday" is primarily styled in the genre of disco. According to the sheet music published at Musicnotes.com by Kobalt Music Publishing America, Inc., "Birthday" has a tempo of 126 beats per minute. Written in the key of B major, it follows a progression of Emaj9–C♯m7–Emaj9–C♯m7–B. Perry's vocals range from B_{3} to F♯_{5}. During a preview event for Prism, held in New York City, Perry described "Birthday" as her "attempt at writing" a song that American singer Mariah Carey would have included in her eponymous debut album. Since its release, its musical composition has been strongly compared to that of other works of Prince and duo Wendy and Lisa.

"Birthday" contains elements of funk-pop, synthpop, and disco house. The song is backed by a "busy but buoyant" instrumentation featuring a "deeply rhythmic impulse". Randall Roberts of the Los Angeles Times felt "Birthday" was a musically updated version of disco, achieved by replacing "cheesy strings" with "jerky breaks and synth washes". Its "joyful" lyrics present the commemoration of her partner's birthday as a metaphor for sexual intercourse. The bridge section of "Birthday", which sees Perry singing "Let me get you in your birthday suit / It's time to bring out the big balloons", was found by Ben Rattliff to resemble French duo Daft Punk's works.

== Critical reception ==
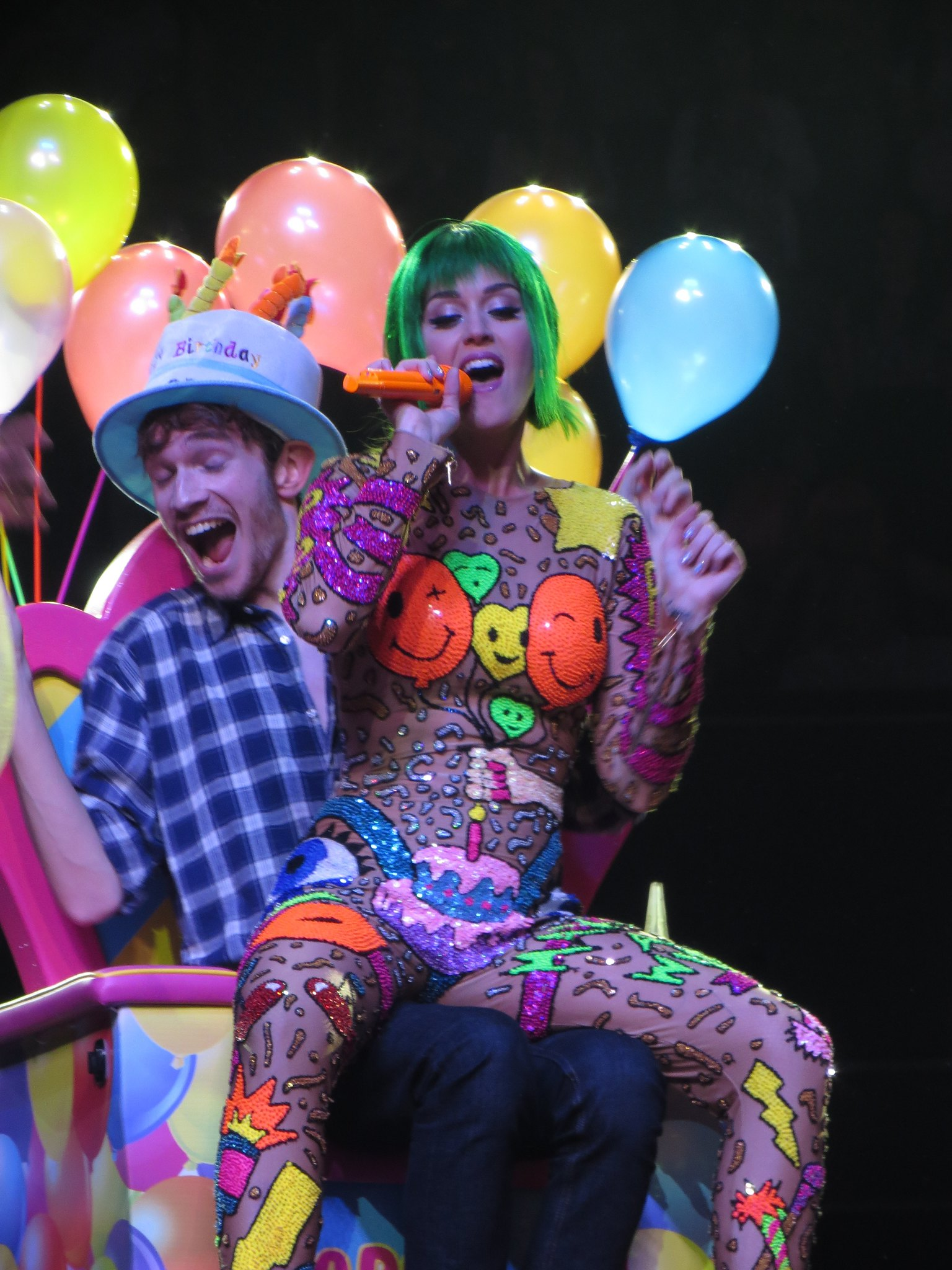
Perry performing "Birthday" in Glasgow

AllMusic's Stephen Thomas Erlewine and Kitty Empire from The Guardian called "Birthday" one of the best tracks from Prism: Erlewine described it as a "glorious retro-disco explosion" and Empire found a "girly simpatico" in the song that sustains it. Marah Eakin from The A.V. Club felt the track was "pure fun". Jason Lipshutz of Billboard called it a "stone-cold stunner", going on to say the song "serves as pop music's (superior) answer to Swizz Beatz's "Everyday Birthday". He also felt it was the song with the "most smash potential" included in Prism. Chris Bosman of Consequence wrote that the song was a "irrepressible disco jam" and found it superior to Carly Rae Jepsen's album Kiss (2012).

Jon Dolan from Rolling Stone noted that the "sunny effervescence" from Teenage Dream was present on the song. Sal Cinquemani from Slant Magazine said that the "sexy and playful" song was "offset by brackish fare". Alexis Petridis from The Guardian felt that the song resembled a four to the floor remix of a Mariah Carey song, but complimented its melodies for being "significantly stronger" than those of Jessie J's album, Alive (2013). Rob Harvilla from Spin criticized the song's "sensuality", which he described as being of "an off-kilter, grade-school goofy, beanie-propeller sort of sensuality". Evan Sawdey of PopMatters deemed "Birthday" the "catchiest thing" on Prism, but he also thought it was a "rewrite" of Jessie J's hit "Domino" and Perry's former song "Last Friday Night (T.G.I.F.)". Lewis Corner from Digital Spy classified it as a "flirty pop-gem", while HitFix's Melinda Newman awarded it a B+ grade, calling it a "delectable pop confection". James Reed from The Boston Globe called the song's double entendre lyrics "hilarious".

== Chart performance ==
Upon the release of Prism, due to strong digital download sales, "Birthday" charted on the singles charts in France and South Korea. It debuted on the Syndicat National de l'Édition Phonographique singles chart at number 160 where it stayed for one week. In South Korea, it peaked at number 51 on the Gaon International Chart with digital downloads of 3,089 copies.

Before being released as a single, the song debuted on the Billboard Hot 100 chart of April 16, 2014, at number 91. One week later, the song jumped to number 83. The following week, it went from 83 to 37. It peaked at 17 on the Hot 100 becoming her 15th entry to reach the top 20 of the chart. The song has peaked at the top of Hot Dance Club Songs chart extending her record for most consecutive dance club no.1 songs to 14. The song has sold more than 1,000,000 copies in the United States; consequently it was certified Platinum by the Recording Industry Association of America (RIAA).

== Music video ==
=== Development and filming ===
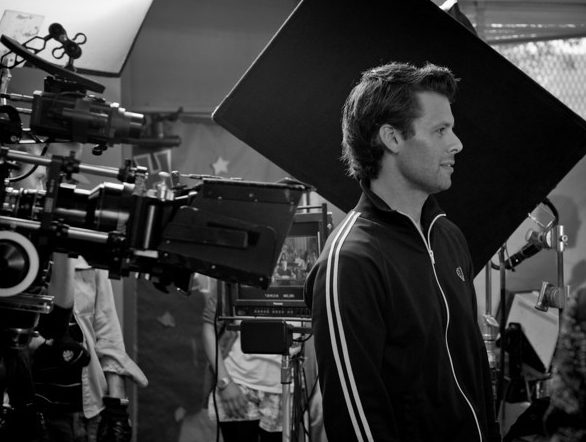
Marc Klasfeld co-directed the music video for "Birthday".

The official music video for "Birthday" was directed by Marc Klasfeld and Danny Lockwood; Dawn Rose served as a producer, while Nicole Acacio served as executive producer, Richard Alarcón served as the editor, Tony Gardner as the make-up artist, and Joseph Robbins was the director of photography. For the video, which was filmed in April 2014, Perry played the characters of five party entertainers, appearing in five parties. This is similar to the British children’s TV series Gigglebiz consisting of the same format of cast as what Justin Fletcher did with characters in the show. They consisted of a burlesque-like elderly woman named Goldie, a Jewish master of ceremonies named Yosef Shulem, a clown named Kriss, an animal trainer named Ace, and a face-painter named Princess Mandee. In order to transform physically into each character, Perry spent up to seven hours getting prosthetic makeup applied by Tony Gardner.

The parties that Perry attended were real, and its participants were unaware of Perry's presence; the organizers believed they had signed up to star in a reality show called "Birthday Blowouts". Similarly, the majority of events that took place during the visual were staged without the knowledge of the celebrations' organizers and guests. For example, the car crash that occurs in the video left several children who observed it frightened and crying. Perry deemed the video "very intricate to make and shoot" and her "most insane" to date. A teaser for the video which introduced the characters was released on April 22, 2014 whereas the complete video was revealed two days later.

=== Synopsis ===
Perry as Yosef Shulem, an alter-ego that was criticized by music critics.

The music video begins with short introductions to Perry's alter-egos Goldie, Yosef, Kriss, Ace, and Mandee. Perry is then shown entering all of the parties as "five of the world’s worst birthday entertainers" in disguise. At a man's 90th birthday, Goldie emerges from a large birthday cake and begins to give the man a lapdance. At a child's birthday party, Kriss the Clown attempts to create balloon animals, while Ace the Animal Trainer introduces a group of children to a box of mice before appearing to eat one, which makes a child cry. At another child's party, Princess Mandee paints a girl's face incompetently; Goldie begins to suffer from respiratory problems, and Yosef does the worm at a boy's Bar Mitzvah. Goldie pulls a man's prosthetic leg off and proceeds to play air guitar with it, and Kriss crashes into a table before drinking alcohol behind a tree.

At the elderly man's party, Goldie collapses and a woman tries to use a defibrillator on her. While attempting to hit a piñata, Kriss walks onto the road to cause a car crash which shocks the party attendees. At the petting cage, Ace lets a goat run wild which defecates and urinates on the ground; meanwhile Goldie drops a birthday cake on the 90-year-old man, Yosef is then shown beatboxing at the Bar Mitzvah. Princess Mandee takes off her hat, wig and mask and reveals herself to be Perry, to which the children scream in pleasure. Goldie eats cake with the elderly man, before straddling him on his wheelchair. At the end of the song, Princess Mandee and the children say "happy birthday" to the camera. During the credits, Perry's five alter-egos dance and lip-sync to a remixed version of the song.

=== Reception ===
Christina Garibaldi of MTV News wrote that Perry "continues to top herself" with the video and billed the video's "approach" as "creative, fun and pretty hysterical". Salon's Daniel D'Addario was critical of character Yosef Shulem, denouncing it as a "Jewish stereotype". He noted that Perry had already been the center of controversy due to being dressed as a geisha for a 2013 performance of "Unconditionally", and questioned her decision to portray Yosef. Writing for Time, Nolan Feeman quipped, "Jewish people aren't costumes" and found the video distracting from the song. Ariana Bacle from Entertainment Weekly dubbed the character "anti-Semitic" and suggested that Perry should stop impersonating members of other cultures. For Consequence of Sound, Chris Coplan called the visual "incredible" and described it as a "less grating and tiresome" version of The Master of Disguise. Complex writer Zach Frydenlund positively remarked that the video "deliver[ed]" and regarded the Goldie character look as "quite nice".

== Live performances ==
"Birthday" was performed as the first encore at the Prismatic World Tour, Perry's third concert tour. The performance of the song at the Newcastle upon Tyne date was broadcast live during the 2014 Billboard Music Awards. On May 25, 2014, Perry performed the song at BBC Radio 1's Big Weekend in Glasgow.

== Track listing ==
- Digital download (Cash Cash Remix)
1. "Birthday" (Cash Cash Remix) – 4:25

== Credits and personnel ==
Song credits adapted from the liner notes of Prism, Capitol Records.

=== Song ===
- Katy Perry – lead and background vocals, songwriting
- Steve Turre – trombone
- Earl Gardner – trumpet
- Lenny Pickett – tenor sax
- Mike Masteller – alto sax
- Ron Blake – baritone sax
- Dr. Luke – instruments and programming, songwriting, production
- Max Martin – instruments and programming, songwriting, production
- Cirkut – instruments and programming, songwriting, production
- Steven Wolf – drums
- Lenny Pickett – horn arrangement
- Dave O'Donnell – horns engineer
- Bonnie McKee – songwriting
- Serban Ghenea – mixing
- Peter Carlsson – engineering
- Clint Gibbs – engineering
- Sam Holland – engineering
- Michael Illbert – engineering
- John Hanes – mixing engineer

=== Music video ===
Credits of the video production adapted from the visual.

- Marc Klasfeld – director
- Danny Lockwood – director
- Nicole Acacio – executive producer
- Dawn Rose – producer
- Joseph Robbins – director of photography
- Richard Alarcon – editor
- Tony Gardner – special effects, makeup and design
- Casey Storm – costume designer
- Lissa Hahn – set dresser
- TJ White – stunt coordinator
- Mark Neiman – special effects makeup
- Hugo Villasneor – special effects makeup
- Jake Bailey – Princess Mandee's makeup
- Olivia Segerstrom – wardrobe assistant
- Mary Beck – wardrobe assistant
- Ryan Cox – wardrobe assistant
- Harwood Lee – tailor
- Eric Holzer – grips
- Robert Meckler – grips
- Greg Mustin – grips
- Curtis Smith – grips
- Ryan Patterson – production designer
- Bill Pollock – color
- Josh Falcon – sound mix
- Kenny Kiesecker – lead assistant editor
- Daniel Miranda – assistant editor
- Eddie Gil DeMontes – additional editing
- David Camera – production supervisor
- Rob Talt – hairdresser
- Kimmie Kyees – nails
- Kammy Lenox – stylist additional talent
- Linda Sammut – hair makeup additional talent
- Gavin Taylor – titles and motion graphics
- Les Umberger – titles and motion graphics
- Ben Schwartz – additional writing
- Bruce Vilanch – additional writing
- Sunset Edit – post-production
- Possum Hill – behind the scenes
- Daylan Williams – behind the scenes
- Mitchie Meija – behind the scenes
- Andy Theiss – behind the scenes
- Reece Miller – behind the scenes
- Michael E. Estrella – first assistant director
- Jimmy Ramirez – second assistant director
- Mike Scheneir – camera operator
- Heather Brown – camera operator
- Christian Meola – swing
- Matt Conrad – camera technician
- Stuart Hammond – camera technician
- Jonathan Dec – clapper loader
- Steve Pennel – art coordinator
- Jamie Klasfeld – party supervisor
- Tony Bollas – sound
- Tracy Mills – video tape recorder
- Carrie La – location manager
- Stephen Kardell – location manager
- Rony Alwin – still photographer
- Alex Cruz – production assistant
- Petra Westen – production assistant
- Mario Valladares – production assistant
- Kristin Guinn – production assistant
- Breece Wilson – production assistant
- Tony Alvarez – production assistant
- Matt Hudson – production assistant
- Deeter Lota – production assistant
- Anthony Ortiz – production assistant
- Hank Hartnell – production assistant
- Henry Arres – production assistant

== Charts ==
=== Weekly charts ===
Chart (2014)	Peak position
Australia (ARIA)	25
Austria (Ö3 Austria Top 40)	51
Belgium (Ultratip Bubbling Under Flanders)	2
Belgium (Ultratip Bubbling Under Wallonia)	2
Canada Hot 100 (Billboard)	7
Canada AC (Billboard)	4
Canada CHR/Top 40 (Billboard)	4
Canada Hot AC (Billboard)	2
CIS Airplay (TopHit)	185
Czech Republic Airplay (ČNS IFPI)	32
Czech Republic Singles Digital (ČNS IFPI)	32
Finland Airplay (Radiosoittolista)	25
France (SNEP)	57
Germany (GfK)	69
Hungary (Editors' Choice Top 40)	21
Ireland (IRMA)	47
Israel (Media Forest TV Airplay)	1
Italy (FIMI)	49
Netherlands (Dutch Top 40)	34
Netherlands (Single Top 100)	56
New Zealand (Recorded Music NZ)	17
Scottish Singles Sales (Official Charts)	16
Slovakia Airplay (ČNS IFPI)	37
Slovakia Singles Digital (ČNS IFPI)	24
Slovenia (SloTop50)	26
South Africa (EMA)	3
South Korea International Singles (Gaon Digital Chart)	10
UK Singles (Official Charts)	22
UK Streaming Chart	28
US Billboard Hot 100	17
US Adult Contemporary (Billboard)	29
US Adult Pop Airplay (Billboard)	11
US Dance Airplay (Billboard)	8
US Dance Club Songs (Billboard)	1
US Pop Airplay (Billboard)	8
US Rhythmic Airplay (Billboard)	25

=== Year-end charts ===
Chart (2014)	Position
Canada (Canadian Hot 100)	50
France (SNEP)	197
US Billboard Hot 100	80
US Dance Club Songs (Billboard)	33
US Mainstream Top 40 (Billboard)	50

== Certifications and sales ==
Region	Certification	Certified units/sales
Australia (ARIA)	3× Platinum	210,000^{‡}
Brazil (Pro-Música Brasil)	Platinum	60,000^{‡}
Canada (Music Canada)	2× Platinum	160,000^{‡}
Finland	Platinum	4,000
France	—	11,500 (Note: Available sales figures in France.)
Italy (FIMI)	Gold	15,000^{‡}
New Zealand (RMNZ)	Platinum	30,000^{‡}
Norway (IFPI Norway)	Gold	30,000^{‡}
South Korea	—	21,763 (Note: South Korea sales figures as of May 24, 2014.)
Sweden (GLF)	Gold	20,000^{‡}
United Kingdom (BPI)	Gold	400,000^{‡}
United States (RIAA)	Platinum	1,000,000^{‡}
^{‡} Sales+streaming figures based on certification alone.

== Release history ==
Release dates and formats for "Birthday"
Region	Date	Format	Version	Label	Ref.
United States	April 21, 2014	Contemporary hit radio	Original	Capitol	
United States	April 21, 2014	Rhythmic contemporary	Original	Capitol	
United States	May 20, 2014	Digital download	Cash Cash remix	Capitol	
United Kingdom	May 22, 2014	Digital download	Cash Cash remix	Capitol	
Italy	June 6, 2014	Radio airplay	Original	Capitol	

== See also ==
- List of Billboard Dance Club Songs number ones of 2014
