= Walking on Air (Katy Perry song) =

Song by Katy Perry

Promotional single by Katy Perry

from the album Prism
- Released: September 30, 2013
- Studio: Apmamman and MXM Studios; (Stockholm, Sweden); Conway Recording Studios; (Hollywood, California)
- Genre: Deep house; Eurodance; disco
- Length: 3:42
- Label: Capitol
- Songwriters: Katy Perry; Klas Åhlund; Max Martin; Adam Baptiste; Caméla Leierth
- Producers: Klas Åhlund; Max Martin

Audio video
- "Walking on Air" on YouTube

"Walking on Air" is a song recorded by American singer Katy Perry for her fourth studio album, Prism (2013), included as its fourth track. The song was written by Perry, alongside Adam Baptiste, Caméla Leierth, and the song's producers Klas Åhlund and Max Martin. It was released to digital retailers on September 30, 2013, by Capitol Records, as the record's second promotional single, following the release of "Dark Horse". The song was part of a poll promoted by Pepsi, along with "Dark Horse", where fans could vote for which song they wanted to become the first promotional single from Prism. Inspired by CeCe Peniston and Crystal Waters, "Walking on Air" is a deep house and disco song influenced by 1990s Eurodance.

Upon the release of Prism, the song received mixed reviews. Music critics felt "Walking on Air" was a catchy track, but were ambivalent towards its musical composition. The track entered multiple charts, reaching the top 20 in Canada, Ireland, Italy, New Zealand, and Spain as well as the top 30 in Belgium and France. The song was also certified Gold by the Australian Recording Industry Association (ARIA) and Recorded Music NZ (RMNZ). Perry promoted "Walking on Air" with several live performances, including at the 2013 iTunes Festival and Saturday Night Live.

== Production and release ==
"Walking on Air" was produced and programmed by Swedish record producers Klas Åhlund and Max Martin. It was recorded and engineered at Apmamman and MXM Studios, located in Stockholm, Sweden, and Conway Recording Studios in Hollywood. It was engineered by Michael Illbert, Peter Carlsson, and Sam Holland, and assisted by Cory Bice. Serban Ghenea later mixed the song at MixStar Studios, in Virginia Beach, Virginia. Background vocals were provided by Sabina Ddumba and the Tensta Gospel Choir.

In a press release on August 20, 2013, PepsiCo announced a partnership with Perry to promote her fourth studio album Prism: the company announced a social "tweet-to-unlock" voting program, where fans could unlock song titles and their respective lyrics, by tweeting the hashtag #KATYNOW. The chosen tracks for the campaign were "Walking on Air" and "Dark Horse". Once tweets voting for each song reached a certain number, their respective samples were unlocked and fans could start to vote for which one they wanted to have an early release on digital retailers. The winner was "Dark Horse", which was released on September 17, 2013 on the iTunes Store. However, after the release of the aforementioned song, the iTunes release of "Walking on Air" was announced, slated for September 30.

== Composition ==
"Walking on Air"
A 19-second sample of the song's pre-chorus, where Perry sings "Just when I think I can't take anymore, we go deeper and harder than ever before" over a deep house-styled instrumental.

Composed in the key of A major, "Walking on Air" is a deep house and disco song set in a 4/4 time signature at a moderately fast tempo of 128 beats per minute. The melody spans the tonal range of E_{3} to E_{5}, while the music follows the chord progression of F♯m–E–C♯m–D . Throughout the song, various elements of 1990s Eurodance and disco music can be heard. The track opens with Perry singing in her lower register over staccato synths until the song's "propulsive" beat begins. The singer has cited CeCe Peniston's "Finally" and Crystal Waters' "100% Pure Love" as inspirations for the sound she was aiming for with this song. Perry's vocals near the end of "Walking on Air" were also compared to those of Christina Aguilera.

Written by Perry, Klas Åhlund, Max Martin, Adam Baptiste, and Caméla Leierth, "Walking on Air" discusses a love "so strong that even heaven is jealous". Gil Kaufman from MTV News commented on the song's composition: "Between her wailing diva vocals, a gospel choir that kicks in during the final minute and the driving beat, Perry has captured a unique sound that both recalls the classic 1970s disco era as well as the EDM thump of today's clubs." HitFix writer Melinda Newman opined that the song was "redolent of '90s dance thumpers and is light as cotton candy and just as enjoyable", adding that it would "make you long for C+C Music Factory". The song was also described as evoking the music of Swedish singer Robyn, an artist of whom Perry is a fan.

== Critical reception ==
Sal Cinquemani from Slant Magazine was very positive of the song: he described it as "surprisingly soulful, throwback" to 1990s deep house, although he noted that Åhlund decided to give Perry a different sound from the Euro electro-pop he had produced for Body Talk (2010). Greg Kot from Chicago Tribune deemed the single a "catchy pop tune", while Randall Roberts from the Los Angeles Times wrote that the song's "euphoria" was "infectious", and Rob Harvilla from Spin classified it as "delicious". Also, Elysa Gardner from USA Today recommended readers to download "Walking on Air".

Other reviews were mixed. Writing for The Guardian, Alexis Petridis criticized Prism for not having anything "sonically adventurous", noting that the album mainly had 1990s pop-house in its songs, giving the example of the "jangling piano riff" present on "Walking on Air", but still found those melodies to be stronger than the ones found on Jessie J's second studio album Alive (2013). In a mixed review of the song, Will Hermes from Rolling Stone described the song as "frothy". Marah Eakin from The A.V. Club commented that "when Perry does stretch [...] she tends to falter", and mentioned "Walking on Air" and "Dark Horse" as examples. Consequence's Chris Bosman described the song as a "vanilla re-interpretation of Hercules and Love Affair".

Helen Brown from The Daily Telegraph classified "Walking on Air" as a "forgettable bit of Nineties rave nostalgia", while James Reed from The Boston Globe deemed it "buoyant", and ABC News music writer Mesfin Fekadu called it "irresistible". Kyle Anderson from Entertainment Weekly described the track as a "David Guetta-esque blast of dancefloor adrenaline". Sam Lansky from website Idolator wrote that the song was "pleasurable", while Trent Wolbe from The Verge said it was a "triumphant ode" to various artists from the 1990s.

== Commercial performance ==
On the week ending October 7, 2013, "Walking on Air" debuted at number 12 on the New Zealand Singles Chart. In Australia, the song charted on the ARIA Digital Track Chart at number 18. On the week ending October 19, 2013, "Walking on Air" debuted at number 34 on the Billboard Hot 100 and debuted at number eight on Billboard Hot Digital Songs with 113,000 downloads. As of November 2013, the song has sold a total of 150,000 copies in the United States. In Italy, the single debuted at 20.

== Live performances ==
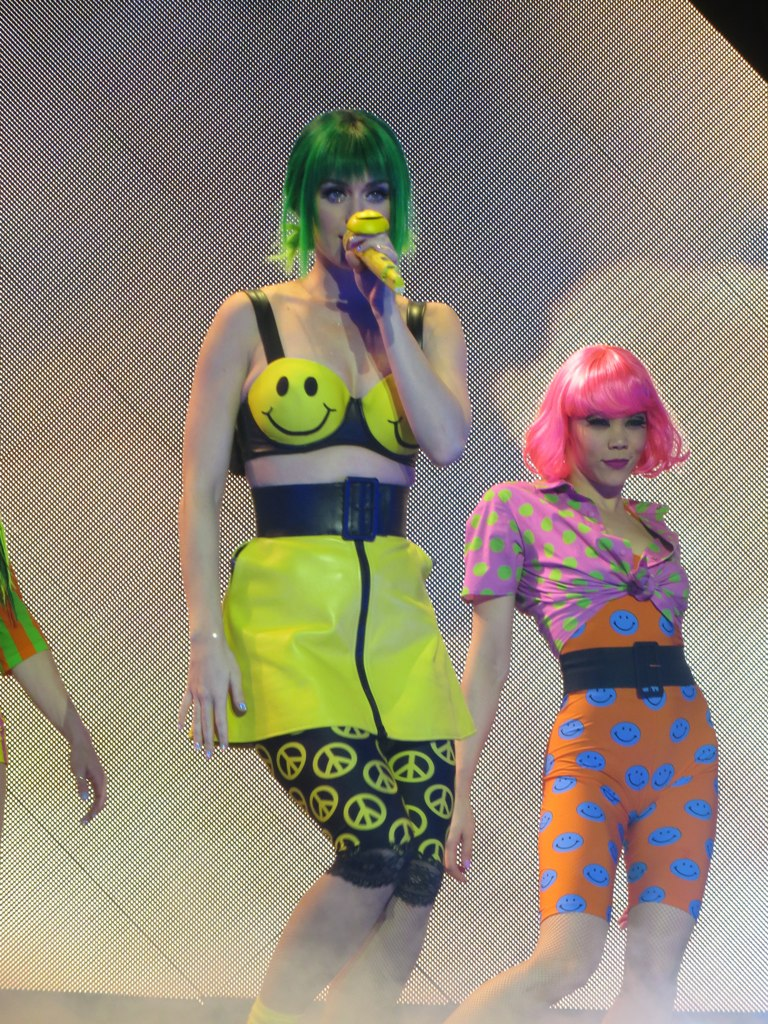
Perry performing "Walking on Air" on her Prismatic World Tour.

On September 30, 2013, Perry performed "Walking on Air" during her headlining set of the 2013 iTunes Festival at the Roundhouse. On October 12, 2013, the singer performed the song again on Saturday Night Live, where she was the musical guest of the episode. She wore a "'90s schoolgirl outfit" composed of a plaid skirt, knee socks and a white crop top. Kelci Shipley from MTV News wrote that Perry "caught a case of retro fever for her performance of 'Walking on Air'". On her 29th birthday, October 25, 2013, Perry performed the song at Lakewood High School in Lakewood, Colorado. On May 25, 2014, she performed it in Glasgow at BBC Radio 1's Big Weekend. "Walking on Air" was added to the setlist of Perry's first concert residency Play (2021–2022) in a medley with her 2021 collaboration with Alesso "When I'm Gone".

== Credits and personnel ==
Credits adapted from Prism liner notes.

=== Recording locations ===
- Recorded at Apmamman and MXM Studios (Stockholm, Sweden); Conway Recording Studios (Hollywood, California)
- Mixed at MixStar Studios (Virginia Beach, Virginia)

=== Personnel ===
- Songwriting – Katy Perry, Klas Åhlund, Max Martin, Adam Baptiste, Caméla Leierth
- Production – Klas Åhlund, Max Martin
- Engineering – Michael Illbert, Peter Carlsson, Sam Holland
- Engineering assistant – Cory Bice
- Mixing – Serban Ghenea
- Mixing engineer – John Hanes
- Lead vocals – Katy Perry
- Background vocals – Sabina Ddumba, Tensta Gospel Choir
- Programming – Klas Åhlund, Max Martin

== Charts ==
Chart (2013–2014)	Peak position
Australia (ARIA Digital Track Chart)	18
Austria (Ö3 Austria Top 40)	35
Belgium (Ultratop 50 Flanders)	44
Belgium (Ultratop 50 Wallonia)	30
Belgium (Ultratop Wallonia Dance)	26
Canada Hot 100 (Billboard)	12
CIS Airplay (TopHit)	189
Denmark (Tracklisten)	35
Euro Digital Song Sales (Billboard)	16
Finland Download (Latauslista)	23
France (SNEP)	25
Greece Digital Songs (Billboard)	7
Hong Kong (HKRIA)	15
Ireland (IRMA)	13
Italy (FIMI)	20
Netherlands (Single Top 100)	47
New Zealand (Recorded Music NZ)	12
Spain (Promusicae)	15
UK Singles (Official Charts)	80
UK Streaming Chart	91
US Billboard Hot 100	34

== Certifications and sales ==
Certifications and sales for "Walking on Air"
Region	Certification	Certified units/sales
Australia (ARIA)	Gold	35,000^{‡}
South Korea	—	8,029 (Note: South Korea sales figures as of October 2013.)
New Zealand (RMNZ)	Gold	7,500^{*}
United States	—	150,000 (Note: United States sales figures as of December 2013.)
^{*} Sales figures based on certification alone.^{‡} Sales+streaming figures based on certification alone.

== Release history ==
Release dates and formats for "Walking on Air"
Territory	Date	Format	Label	Ref.
Various	September 30, 2013	Digital download	Capitol	
