= Unconditionally =

2013 single by Katy Perry

Single by Katy Perry

from the album Prism
- Released: October 16, 2013
- Studio: Luke's in the Boo (Malibu, California); Conway (Hollywood, California); MXM Studios (Stockholm, Sweden); Secret Garden Studios (Montecito, California)
- Genre: Pop rock
- Length: 3:48
- Label: Capitol
- Songwriters: Katy Perry; Lukasz Gottwald; Max Martin; Henry Walter
- Producers: Dr. Luke; Max Martin; Cirkut

Katy Perry singles chronology
"Who You Love" (2013)	"Unconditionally" (2013)	"Dark Horse" (2013)

Music video
- "Unconditionally" on YouTube

"Unconditionally" is a song by American singer Katy Perry. It was released as the second single from her fourth studio album Prism (2013) on October 16, 2013, two days before the album was released. Inspiration for the song came primarily from a humanitarian trip to Madagascar that Perry made in partnership with UNICEF. Having been surrounded by what she described as unconditional love, she co-wrote it with the song's producers Dr. Luke, Max Martin and Cirkut to reflect that feeling. The song was recorded at Luke's in the Boo, based in Malibu, California, Conway Recording Studios, based in Hollywood, Los Angeles, MXM Studios, based in Stockholm, Sweden, and Secret Garden Studios, based in Montecito, California. "Unconditionally" is a pop power ballad styled in rock, backed against a bassline and percussion.

Commercially, the song peaked within the top ten in Bulgaria, the Czech Republic, Italy, Lebanon, Slovenia, and South Africa as well as the top twenty in Australia, Austria, Canada, Hungary, Poland, Slovakia, and the United States. It also was certified diamond in Brazil and received multi-platinum certifications in Australia, Canada, the United States. The single release was promoted with an Instagram-based campaign, a lyric video directed by Aya Tanimura and live performances. Her performance of "Unconditionally" at the American Music Awards of 2013 was the center of controversy due to accusations of cultural appropriation. Brent Bonacorso served as the director for the track's main music video, released on November 19, 2013, which adopts the theme of love and uses a series of metaphors to enrich its concept.

== Writing and production ==
"Unconditionally" was written by Perry alongside its producers Dr. Luke, Max Martin, and Cirkut. Perry called the song her favorite within the record. She also mentioned that she wrote the song bearing in mind the sentiments she had felt during her UNICEF humanitarian trip to Madagascar in April 2013. Such sentiments inspired her to delve into the theme of unconditional love. She stated that, while on that voyage, Perry and her team would "go in cruisers up the mountain" to see newly constructed schools. After observing a group of children, she realized that even without social networking, they felt "pure" unconditional love towards each other.

Inspired by that situation, the song was described by Perry as approaching all forms of love. "I love this song because not only can it be a romantic, intimate song", she expounded. "But it can be about the type of love that a mother has when she sees her first child, or best friends [...] It is a transcendent love, not just relationship status." "Unconditionally" was also inspired by the acceptance of one's flaws in a relationship, which Perry believed was relatable to listeners. It was engineered by Peter Carlsson, Clint Gibbs, Sam Holland, and Michael Illbert, with assistance by Eric Eylands, Rachael Findlen, Justin Fox, and Cory Bice, at the MXM Studios in Stockholm, Sweden and Conway Recording Studios in Hollywood, California. Perry also handled vocal production. Engineering for mix was carried out by John Hanes and final mixing was helmed by Serban Ghenea at the MixStar Studios in Virginia Beach, Virginia.

== Composition ==
At a length of 3 minutes 48 seconds, "Unconditionally" is a pop power ballad, which is styled in the genre of rock. According to the sheet music published by Kobalt Music Publishing America, Inc. at Musicnotes.com, it is written in the key of E minor. It paces at a moderately fast metronome, at approximately 126-132 beats per minute, while it is set at a 4/4 time signature, following a chord progression of Em–C–G–D. Perry's vocals in the track span from G_{3} to C_{5}. The track's "uncluttered" instrumentation features woodblock percussion and a "dramatic" bass line. Lyrically, Jason Lipshutz from Billboard deemed it the "most mature offering" on Prism, claiming it served as a "predicate" to Perry's 2010 single "Teenage Dream".

== Release and promotion ==
In September 2013, Perry teased the release of the song as the second single from Prism, without revealing its title or date. However, MTV News concluded that such song was "Unconditionally", which she discussed during a listening party for the record. The release was confirmed by Billboard. The track debuted on October 16, 2013 and was serviced by Capitol Records to contemporary hit radio stations in the United States on October 22. The next day, it was sent to Australian radio stations. A CD single was released in Germany on November 22— the same date it was serviced to radios in Italy. In France, imports of the CD started being sold on December 3. A remix version of the song by Johnson Somerset was featured on a compilation album entitled Songs for the Philippines benefiting those affected by Typhoon Haiyan in the Philippines.

The lyric video for "Unconditionally", directed by Aya Tanimura, was released on October 18, 2013. Set in a monochromatic pattern, it features actresses Janell Shirtcliff and Erika Linder, who appear naked. As Shirtcliff mouths the song's lyrics, which appear in white and fade slowly, Linder looks "painful[ly]" into the camera. They are only shown together by the end of the video, in which scene they look into each other's eyes. The video is different in style and approach from the song's official music video, which is retro-styled. Fans were invited to participate in an Instagram-based campaign, in which they could upload a photo of "what unconditional love meant to them", along with their story and location in order for it to appear on a "Prism map of the world".

== Critical reception ==
Jason Lipshutz from Billboard deemed the song a "visceral ballad" capable of conveying its theme of relationships. John Walker from MTV praised the track and felt that the lyrics could be written from the perspective of Jesus, denoting possible Christian undertones within them. Kitty Empire of The Guardian reckoned the track was "ungainly" and "adverbial"; Helen Brown of The Daily Telegraph wrote that its lyrics had "self-help lingo", although she remarked that "Perry's genuine faith in it, along with her wit and sense of fun, powers her through". Kevin Fallon from The Daily Beast regarded it as adequate for a Nicholas Sparks-adapted movie, however, he noted that Perry's vocal delivery saved the song of being "schmaltzy".

HitFix's Melinda Newman graded the track with a 'B'—she felt Perry's voice sounded "soaring", and opined that the theme of the song resonated due to Perry's vocal and overall delivery. Glenn Gamboa of Newsday thought Perry "ruined" the track, which she deemed "decent", for pronouncing the song title as "uncondiSHUNally". In his review for Prism, Jon Dolan from Rolling Stone wrote that the song "set stark revelations to torrential Euro splendor". Katie Woodard from Nouse said the song's "power ballad approach" highlights Perry's vocal performance. Trent Wolfe of The Verge, however, thought the song was part of the group of the Prism tracks that could "benefit from a preciously strummed six-string" instead of "beats and synths". Digital Spy's Robert Copsey awarded the song with a four out of five points rating, writing that Perry sounded "effortless" as compared to her peers.

== Commercial performance ==
"Unconditionally" debuted on the US Billboard Hot 100 at number 30. The next week, it moved five spots up to number 25; it further moved four spots the following week. On its fourth week, the track went to number 16 and one week later it rose one spot. It later peaked at number 14 on the chart. On the component charts of Billboard, "Unconditionally" enjoyed success—it peaked atop the Hot Dance Club Songs, while reaching number seven on the Adult Top 40 and number 16 on the Adult Contemporary charts. On the Pop Songs chart, it peaked at number eight. The song has sold more than 2,000,000 units in the United States; consequently it was certified double platinum by the Recording Industry Association of America (RIAA).

"Unconditionally" achieved moderate success in Oceanic regions. The song debuted and peaked at 11 on Australia's ARIA Singles Chart, spending a total of 13 weeks on the chart. It received a platinum certification by the Australian Recording Industry Association (ARIA), denoting more than 70,000 copies sold. In New Zealand, the song entered at 26, where it ultimately peaked. The song spent 10 weeks on the singles chart.

In Europe, the song reached its highest position of number 5 in Bulgaria while having its lowest peak in Russia, at number 69. "Unconditionally" reached number 16 on the Ö3 Austria Top 40—where it spent 12 weeks. On the Italian, German and Czech single charts, it was able to peak within the top 10, at number 6 for the first two and number 8 on the latter. In Italy, the track sold more than 50,000 copies and was certified Platinum by the Federation of the Italian Music Industry (FIMI). On the French SNEP chart, it peaked at number 38. In the United Kingdom, "Unconditionally" reached number 25; while in Ireland it peaked at number 27. It fared better in Slovakia where it charted at number 11. Within Belgium, the track reached numbers 49 and 26 in Flanders and Wallonia, respectively. In the Mexican Monitor Latino and Poland single chart, "Unconditionally" managed to peak at 17 while reaching number 32 in Netherlands. The track charted at number 40 in Spain, becoming her tenth top-forty in the country.

== Music video ==
=== Production and release ===
The music video for "Unconditionally", directed by Brent Bonacorso, was filmed in London during October 2013. It was partly inspired by the costume drama films Dangerous Liaisons and Anna Karenina. During an interview with MTV News, Bonacorso talked about the concept for the video. He stressed that he wanted to match the song's tone with its visual, explaining that he wanted to depict a "more mysterious, elegant and sophisticated world to live in. ... less about a time period and more about creating an impression and a feeling." As the song essentially discusses the feeling of love, the video itself sees Perry amidst scenarios which refer to the power of it. The video is set in two different spaces, as Perry is found both in a snowy background and in a ballroom surrounded by dancers, which are mostly dressed in black apparel. Those settings were used to represent "different part[s] of the subconscious". The video premiered through MTV on November 19, 2013.

=== Synopsis ===
It begins with Perry, sitting on the ground while mouthing the lyrics of the song and staring at the viewer. As she finishes the first verse, the camera shifts to a ballroom, in which elegantly-dressed dancers start to dance. The song's chorus kicks in, and Perry is now found in the ballroom, in the middle of all the dancers. As the second verse begins, she has an owl on her arm, which she lets go and flies. The bird represents "something strong, free [and] powerful", according to Bonacorso, who added: "She lets it go into the world[,] and that literally [means] letting this force within her go wild. That's an important part of love[,] is that you have to let it go." The video also shows Perry, with a golden dress and cross-shaped earrings, with flames on her body. By the second repetition of the chorus, a bed gets lit on fire, which the director included to refer to love that "can burn you like an inferno". As the song reaches its climax, Perry gets hit by a car, with tiny broken debris from it shattering behind her, while she remains stationary and unharmed. This scene symbolizes the experience of true love, that changes "your world" and "hits you out of the blue". This scene cuts back to the ballroom, where Perry is surrounded by a similar explosion of "colorful" flowers, which is used to contrast the more violent nature of falling in love and the softer part of it, the "joyful and wonderful" feelings.

== Live performances ==
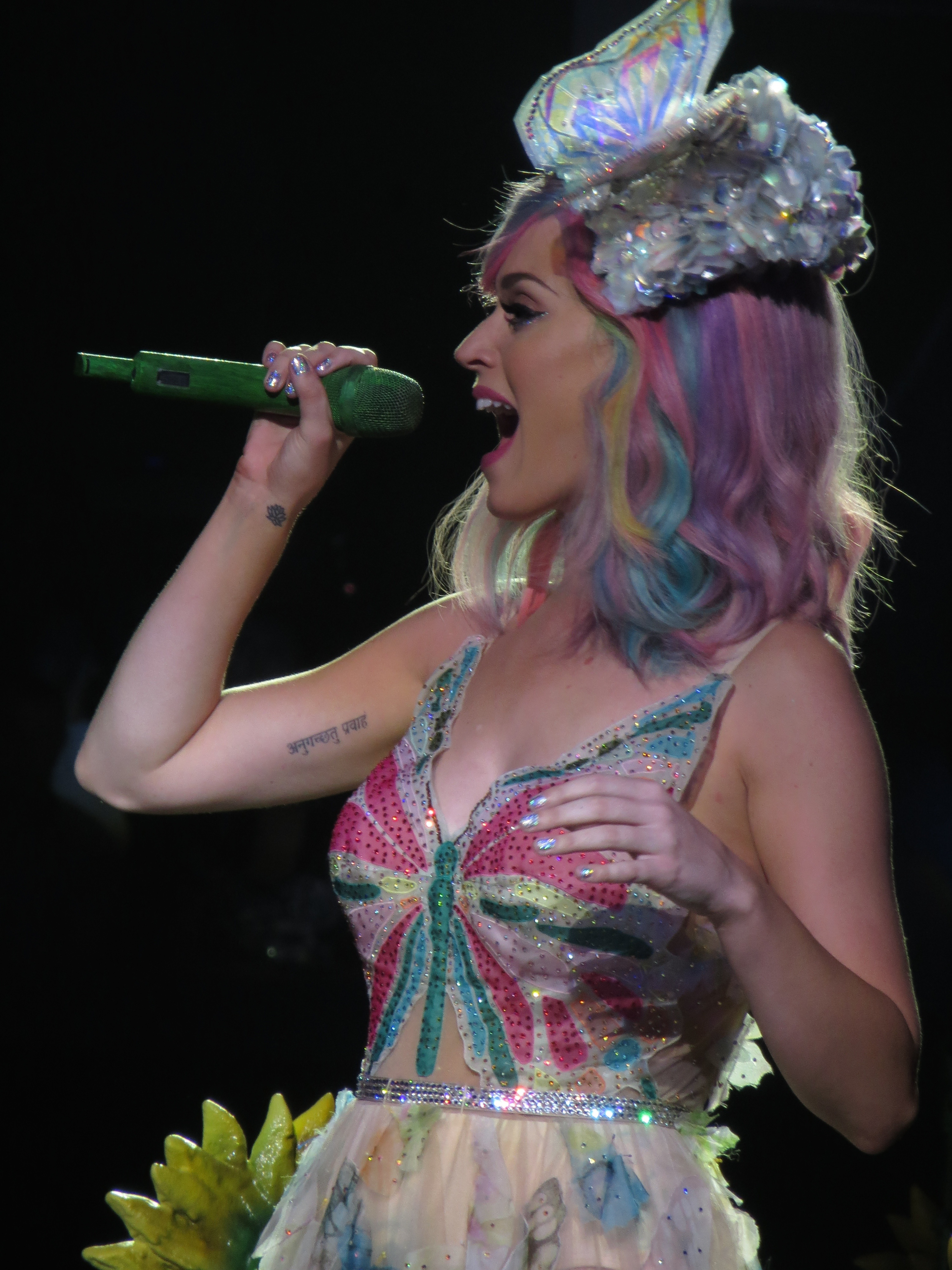
Perry performing "Unconditionally" on her Prismatic World Tour

On October 22, 2013, Perry first performed "Unconditionally" along with her other Prism tracks at the iHeartRadio Theater in Los Angeles, California. She also performed these songs the next day when hosting the "We Can Survive" concert along with friends Bonnie McKee, Kacey Musgraves, Sara Bareilles, Ellie Goulding, and duo Tegan and Sara at the Hollywood Bowl in Los Angeles. Perry also performed the song on the Australian breakfast program Sunrise that day. On November 10, 2013, she performed "Unconditionally" at the 2013 MTV Europe Music Awards. She also opened the American Music Awards of 2013 on November 24, 2013, with a geisha-inspired performance of the song. On December 5, 2013, Perry performed the song on the Italian X Factor. On December 13, 2013, Perry also performed the song on The Voice of Germany together with four contestants of the show. On December 14, 2013, Perry performed "Unconditionally" at the NRJ Music Awards 2014. She also performed "Unconditionally" on the season 10 finale of The X Factor (UK) on December 15, 2013. Perry performed a stripped-down version of the song on the December 20, 2013 episodes of The Ellen DeGeneres Show and Alan Carr: Chatty Man.

=== Controversy ===
The performance of "Unconditionally" at the American Music Awards led to accusations of cultural appropriation and racism from Asian-American groups and media outlets from the Wall Street Journal to Psychology Today for Perry dressing up as a geisha during the performance. Her stylist and America's Next Top Model creative director Johnny Wujek explained later "Katy and I both love Japan... The people are so kind, there's so much there visually" then described his process of finding authentic kimono then cutting them up according to his own inspirations. Lady Gaga defended Perry, stating: "I think people are generally too sensitive and they should just leave her be".

Today stated that although numerous media outlets had negative opinions about her performance, not all viewers agreed with the criticism against Perry. Some American fans of East Asian descent defended the singer or suggested that Perry's Japanese fans would appreciate her "nod to [Japanese] culture".

== Track listing ==
- CD
1. "Unconditionally" – 3:48
2. "Unconditionally" (instrumental) – 3:48

== Credits and personnel ==
- Vocals: Katy Perry
- Songwriting: Katy Perry, Lukasz Gottwald, Max Martin, Henry Walter
- Production: Dr. Luke, Max Martin, Cirkut

Credits adapted from Prism album liner notes.

== Charts ==
=== Weekly charts ===
Weekly chart performance
Chart (2013–2014)	Peak position
Australia (ARIA)	11
Austria (Ö3 Austria Top 40)	16
Belgium (Ultratop 50 Flanders)	49
Belgium (Ultratop 50 Wallonia)	26
Bulgaria Airplay (BAMP)	5
Canada Hot 100 (Billboard)	13
Canada AC (Billboard)	11
Canada CHR/Top 40 (Billboard)	14
Canada Hot AC (Billboard)	6
CIS Airplay (TopHit)	94
Colombia (National-Report)	20
Czech Republic Airplay (ČNS IFPI)	7
Euro Digital Song Sales (Billboard)	16
Finland Airplay (Radiosoittolista)	20
France (SNEP)	38
Germany (GfK)	22
Hungary (Rádiós Top 40)	14
Ireland (IRMA)	27
Italy (FIMI)	6
Lebanon (The Official Lebanese Top 20)	6
Mexico Anglo (Monitor Latino)	17
Mexico (Billboard Mexican Airplay)	34
Netherlands (Dutch Top 40)	32
New Zealand (Recorded Music NZ)	26
Poland Airplay (ZPAV)	17
Romania (Airplay 100)	61
Russia Airplay (TopHit)	84
Scottish Singles Sales (Official Charts)	24
Slovakia Airplay (ČNS IFPI)	11
Slovenia (SloTop50)	10
South Africa Airplay (EMA)	8
Spain (Promusicae)	40
Sweden (Sverigetopplistan)	48
Switzerland (Schweizer Hitparade)	27
UK Singles (Official Charts)	25
UK Streaming Chart	29
US Billboard Hot 100	14
US Adult Contemporary (Billboard)	16
US Adult Pop Airplay (Billboard)	7
US Dance Club Songs (Billboard)	1
US Pop Airplay (Billboard)	8
Venezuela Pop Rock (Record Report)	13

=== Year-end charts ===
2013 year-end chart performance
Chart (2013)	Position
Netherlands (Dutch Top 40)	169

2014 year-end chart performance
Chart (2014)	Position
Canada (Canadian Hot 100)	65
France (SNEP)	179
Hungary (Rádiós Top 40)	77
Italy (FIMI)	87
US Adult Contemporary (Billboard)	50
US Adult Top 40 (Billboard)	44
US Dance Club Songs (Billboard)	32

== Certifications and sales ==
Certifications and sales
Region	Certification	Certified units/sales
Australia (ARIA)	4× Platinum	280,000^{‡}
Austria (IFPI Austria)	Gold	15,000^{*}
Brazil (Pro-Música Brasil)	Diamond	250,000^{‡}
Canada (Music Canada)	3× Platinum	240,000^{‡}
Finland	Platinum	4,000
France (SNEP)	Gold	100,000^{‡}
Germany (BVMI)	Gold	150,000^{‡}
Italy (FIMI)	Platinum	30,000^{‡}
New Zealand (RMNZ)	Platinum	30,000^{‡}
Norway (IFPI Norway)	Platinum	60,000^{‡}
South Korea	—	28,686 (Note: South Korea sales figures as of November 2013.)
Spain (Promusicae)	Gold	30,000^{‡}
United Kingdom (BPI)	Platinum	600,000^{‡}
United States (RIAA)	2× Platinum	2,000,000^{‡}
Streaming
Denmark (IFPI Danmark)	Gold	900,000^{†}
Sweden (GLF)	Platinum	8,000,000^{†}
^{*} Sales figures based on certification alone.^{‡} Sales+streaming figures based on certification alone.^{†} Streaming-only figures based on certification alone.

== Release history ==
Release history
Region	Date	Format	Version(s)	Label	Ref.
United States	October 22, 2013	Contemporary hit radio	Original	Capitol	
Australia	October 23, 2013	Radio airplay	Original	Universal	
United States	November 5, 2013	Hot adult contemporary radio	Original	Capitol	
Germany	November 22, 2013	CD	Original; instrumental	Universal	
Italy	November 22, 2013	Radio airplay	Original	Universal	
United Kingdom	December 16, 2013	Radio airplay	Original	Virgin EMI	

== See also ==
- List of Billboard Dance Club Songs number ones of 2014
