= List of Katy Perry live performances =

Katy Perry live performances
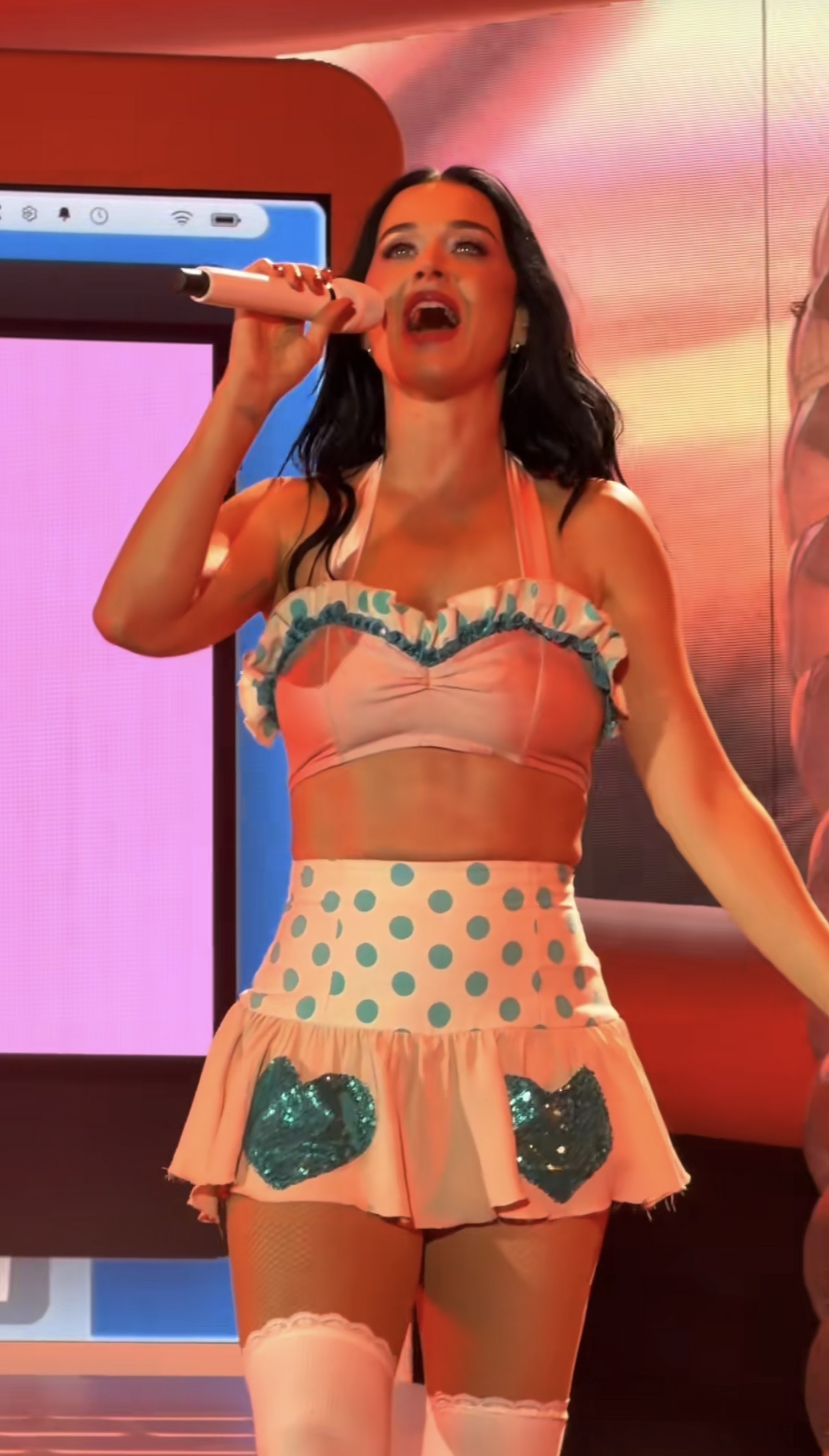
- Perry performing at her 2026 Out of Office Tour
- Concert tours: 5
- Concert residency: 1
- Solo Performances: 46
- Live Performances: 163

American singer Katy Perry has released seven studio albums, an acoustic album and two live albums since her debut in 2001, spawning five international concert tours as well as numerous televised promotional performances and award show appearances. Her self-titled debut album, Katy Hudson (2001), was strictly Christian pop and contemporary worship music. To promote her debut studio album, Perry embarked solo performances throughout the United States. Since officially adopting the stage name "Katy Perry", she has taken on a broader, more "pop" aesthetic and sound, no longer only recording Christian music. Since the release of her second record, One of the Boys (2008), she has been promoting all of her pop records via touring and performances at international shows and festivals, including Jingle Ball and the MTV Video Music Awards, among others.

In 2009, Perry embarked on her first headlining concert tour, the Hello Katy Tour, which visited North America, Europe, Asia and Oceania, grossing just over $1.5 million from 89 shows. Perry released her live extended play (EP) MTV Unplugged, as part of the MTV Unplugged series, in November of that year. In 2011, she embarked on her second tour and her first world tour, the California Dreams Tour, to promote her third studio album, Teenage Dream (2010). The tour visited Europe, Oceania, Asia, North America and marked Perry’s first visit to South America. The tour was an international success, with tickets selling-out, and the show ranking 16th in Pollstar's "2011 Top 25 Worldwide Tours", earning over $59.5 million. At the end of 2011, Billboard Magazine ranked the tour at #13 on its list of "Top 25 Tours" for 2011, earning nearly $48.9 million and won the Favorite Headliner Tour Award at the 38th People's Choice Awards. In July 2012, she released her first documentary theatre movie, Katy Perry: Part of Me, which included footage from the California Dreams Tour.

Perry's third world tour, the Prismatic World Tour, began in May 2014 and ended in October 2015, after having visited Europe, North America, Oceania, Asia and South America. The tour supported her fourth studio album, Prism, which was released in October 2013. The tour grossed more than $204.3 million from 151 shows, with a total attendance of 1,984,503 people between 2014 and 2015, becoming Perry's longest, most-attended, highest-grossing and most successful tour, to-date. The Sydney, Australia concert on November 28, 2014 was recorded for her second live album, The Prismatic World Tour Live, which was released in October 2015, two weeks after the tour ended in San José, Costa Rica.

In July 2016, the singer released "Rise", the official song for the 2016 Summer Olympics. A year later, she released her fifth studio album, Witness (2017); the album's homonymous track was leaked online in May of 2016. The album was released in June of 2017. To accompany the album's release, the singer broadcast herself for four days on YouTube, with a four-day live-stream, titled Katy Perry Live: Witness World Wide. Three months later, Witness: The Tour began in Montréal, Québec, after some dates were either cancelled or rescheduled "due to production issues". At the end of 2017, the tour placed at number 77 on Pollstar's "2017 Year-End Top 100 Worldwide Tours" list, estimating that it grossed $28.1 million and that 266,300 people attended throughout the year. In July 2018, Pollstar ranked the tour on #14 at the Mid Year Top 100 Worldwide Tours 2018 with $48.8 million and 577,617 of tickets sold in 54 shows. The tour grossed more than $124.2 million and it became Perry's second most successful tour to date.

In May 2021, Perry announced her first Las Vegas concert residency, titled Play, at the Theatre at Resorts World Las Vegas, with shows scheduled from December 29, 2021 to January 15, 2022. Eight more shows were added later that month in-response to popular demand, extending the residency to March 19, 2022. The Las Vegas residency opened to a sold-out crowd at the 5,000-capacity theatre, with the farthest back seat being only 150 feet from the stage. The singer later announced, in January 2022, that she had added 16 more shows from May 27-August 13, 2022. She then scheduled eight further in October 2022, due to high demand. Play ended on November 4, 2023.

In 2025, Perry embarked on The Lifetimes Tour which became her first concert tour since Witness: The Tour (2017-2018) and grossed more than $134 million and sold 1.05 million tickets. In doing so, it became her second highest grossing tour behind the Prismatic World Tour (2014–2015). Perry's November shows at Accor Arena in Paris were recorded for a concert film, titled The Lifetimes Tour – Live from Paris. It was released on June 8, 2026, at the Tribeca Festival.

== Concert tours ==
List of concert tours, showing dates, associated album(s), number of shows, and relevant statistics
Title	Dates	Associated album(s)	Continent(s)	Shows	Gross	Attendance	Ref.
Hello Katy Tour	January 23 – August 30, 2009	One of the Boys	North America; Europe; Asia; Oceania	86	$1,500,000	69,577	
California Dreams Tour	February 20, 2011 – January 22, 2012	Teenage Dream	Europe; Oceania; Asia; North America; South America	124	$59,500,000	1,069,921	
Prismatic World Tour	May 7, 2014 – October 18, 2015	Prism	Europe; North America; Oceania; Asia; South America	151	$204,300,000	1,984,503	
Witness: The Tour	September 19, 2017 – August 21, 2018	Witness	North America; South America; Asia; Europe; Africa; Oceania	115	$124,200,000	1,134,917	
The Lifetimes Tour	April 23 – December 7, 2025	143	North America; Oceania; South America; Europe; Asia	91	$134,000,000	1,050,000	
Out of Office Tour	June 18 – July 25, 2026	—	Europe	18	—	—	

=== As an opening act ===
List of concert tours as an opening act, showing dates and headlining artist(s)
Title	Dates	Headlining artist(s)	Country	Ref(s)
2009 Summer Tour	August 4, 2009	No Doubt	United States	

=== As a special guest ===
List of concert tours as a special guest, showing dates and headlining artist(s)
Title	Dates	Headlining artist(s)	Country	Ref(s)
Fearless Tour	April 15, 2010	Taylor Swift	United States	

== Concert residencies ==
Title	Dates	Location	Shows	Gross	Attendance	Ref.
Play	December 29, 2021 – November 4, 2023	Resorts World Theatre, Las Vegas, Nevada, United States	80	$46,400,000	309,000	
Play setlist: 1. "E.T."; 2. "Chained to the Rhythm"; 3. "Dark Horse"; 4. "Not the End of the World"; 5. "California Gurls"; 6. "Hot n Cold" / "Last Friday Night (T.G.I.F.)"; 7. "Waking Up in Vegas" (Jazz version); 8. "Bon Appétit"; 9. "Daisies" (Oliver Heldens Remix); 10. "I Kissed a Girl"; 11. "Lost" / "Part of Me" / "Wide Awake" (Acoustic); 12. "Never Really Over"; 13. "Swish Swish"; 14. "When I'm Gone" / "Walking on Air"; 15. "Teenage Dream"; 16. "Smile"; 17. "Roar"; Encore: 18. "The Greatest Love of All"; 19. "Firework"

== Solo performances ==
Date	City	State	Venue
September 6, 2001	Sherman	Texas	Austin College Auditorium
September 7, 2001	San Antonio	Texas	University United Methodist Church
September 8, 2001	Abilene	Texas	Hardin–Simmons University
September 9, 2001	Austin	Texas	Westlake Bible Church
September 11, 2001	Wichita Falls	Texas	The Wichita Theater
September 13, 2001	Dallas	Texas	The Door
September 14, 2001	Norman	Oklahoma	Common Ground CoffeeHouse
September 15, 2001	Houston	Texas	1st Baptist Church-Metro Worship
September 16, 2001	Bryan	Texas	VFW Wall
September 19, 2001	Lubbock	Texas	Indiana Avenue Baptist Church
September 21, 2001	Bartlesville	Oklahoma	Bartlesville Wesleyan College
September 22, 2001	Shiloam Springs	Arkansas	JBU Cathedral of the Ozarks
September 23, 2001	Jonesboro	Arkansas	First Baptist Church
September 26, 2001	Arkadelphia	Arkansas	Ouchita Baptist University
September 28, 2001	Grove City	Arkansas	Grove City College (Crawford Auditorium)
September 29, 2001	Grantham	Arkansas	Messiah College (Brewbaker Auditorium)
October 3, 2001	Malibu	California	Pepperdine University
October 6, 2001	Deerfield	Illinois	Trinity College
October 7, 2001	Bolingbrook	Illinois	Westbrook Christian Church
October 9, 2001	Upland	Indiana	Taylor University
October 11, 2001	Toledo	Ohio	University of Toledo
October 12, 2001	Dubuque	Iowa	Emmaus Bible College Auditorium
October 13, 2001	Wilmore	Kentucky	Asbury College
October 14, 2001	Nashville	Tennessee	Belcourt Theater
October 15, 2001	Nashville	Tennessee	Belcourt Theater
October 16, 2001	Lafayette	Indiana	University Church at Purdue University
October 18, 2001	Bloomington	Illinois	Sherwood Oaks Christian
October 20, 2001	Grand Rapids	Michigan	Ground Floor, Res Life Church
October 21, 2001	Milwaukee	Wisconsin	Crossroads Presbyterian
October 22, 2001	New Brighton	Minnesota	O'Shaughnessy Education Center
October 23, 2001	Sioux Falls	South Dakota	University of Sioux Falls
October 25, 2001	Colorado Springs	Colorado	Vanguard Church
October 26, 2001	Boulder	Colorado	Flat Irons Theater
October 27, 2001	Denver	Colorado	Regis University Auditorium
October 28, 2001	Buena Vista	Colorado	Mountain Heights Baptist
October 31, 2001	Hattiesburg	Mississippi	William Carey College (Smith Auditorium)
November 1, 2001	Gainesville	Florida	Florida Theater
November 2, 2001	Tallahassee	Florida	Lawton Chiles Auditorium
November 4, 2001	Orlando	Florida	Wesley Foundation
November 9, 2001	West Palm	Florida	Palm Beach Atlantic College
November 11, 2001	Clemson	South Carolina	Clemson University
November 12, 2001	Montgomery	Alabama	The Train Shed
November 13, 2001	Auburn	Alabama	Auburn University
November 16, 2001	Columbia	South Carolina	Shandon Baptist Church
November 17, 2001	Elon	North Carolina	1st United Methodist Church of Elon
November 18, 2001	Harrisonburg	Virginia	Court Square Theater

== Live performances ==
=== 2000s ===
Date	Event	City	Performed song(s)	Ref.
April 8, 2008	Last Call with Carson Daly	Burbank	"Fingerprints"; "Ur So Gay"; "Thinking of You"	
August 29, 2008	Today	New York City	"I Kissed a Girl"; "Hot n Cold"	
September 7, 2008	2008 MTV Video Music Awards	Los Angeles	"Like a Virgin"; "I Kissed a Girl"	
September 10, 2008	Special concert at the Water Rats	London	"Fingerprints"; "One of the Boys"; "If You Can Afford Me"; "Hot n Cold"; "Mannequin"; "Thinking of You"; "Ur So Gay"; "Waking Up in Vegas"; "Your Love"; "I Kissed a Girl"	
September 16, 2008	Special concert at Die Werkstatt	Cologne	"One of the Boys"; "Self Inflicted"; "Hot n Cold"; "If You Can Afford Me"; "Fingerprints"; "Ur So Gay"; "Waking Up in Vegas"; "Mannequin"; "Thinking of You"; "I Kissed a Girl"	
September 20, 2008	NRJ Music Tour 2008	Marseille	"I Kissed a Girl"	
September 23, 2008	Later... with Jools Holland	London	"Waking Up in Vegas"; "I Kissed a Girl"	
September 24, 2008	Special concert at Scala	London	"Fingerprints"; "One of the Boys"; "Use Your Love"; "Hot n Cold"; "If You Can Afford Me"; "Mannequin"; "Ur So Gay"; "Thinking of You"; "Waking Up in Vegas"; "I Kissed a Girl"	
September 26, 2008	Special concert at Anella Olímpica	Barcelona	"Fingerprints"; "One of the Boys"; "Use Your Love"; "Hot n Cold"; "If You Can Afford Me"; "Mannequin"; "Ur So Gay"; "Thinking of You"; "Waking Up in Vegas"; "I Kissed a Girl"	
October 6, 2008	The Tonight Show with Jay Leno	Burbank	"Hot n Cold"	
October 9, 2008	Sunrise	Sydney	"I Kissed a Girl"; "Hot n Cold"	
October 10, 2008	Special concert at The Forum	Sydney	"One of the Boys"; "Self Inflicted"; "Hot n Cold"; "If You Can Afford Me"; "Fingerprints"; "Ur So Gay"; "Waking Up in Vegas"; "Mannequin"; "Thinking of You"; "I Kissed a Girl"	
October 12, 2008	The Rove	Sydney	"I Kissed a Girl"	
October 13, 2008	The Forum Theatre	Melbourne	"One of the Boys"; "Fingerprints"; "Mannequin"; "Hot n Cold"; "I Kissed a Girl"	
October 16, 2008	Los Premios MTV Latinoamérica 2008	Guadalajara	"I Kissed a Girl"	
November 6, 2008	2008 MTV Europe Music Awards	Liverpool	"I Kissed a Girl"; "Hot n Cold"	
November 9, 2008	Special concert at Café Kesse	Hamburg	"One of the Boys"; "Self Inflicted"; "Hot n Cold"; "If You Can Afford Me"; "Fingerprints"; "Ur So Gay"; "Waking Up in Vegas"; "Mannequin"; "Thinking of You"; "I Kissed a Girl"	
November 12, 2008	In-Store Zavvi	London	"Hot n Cold"; "Thinking of You"; "I Kissed a Girl"	
November 13, 2008	Little Noise Sessions	London	"I'm Still Breathing"	
December 6, 2008	2008 KIIS-FM Jingle Ball	Anaheim	"Hot n Cold"; "Waking Up in Vegas"; "Thinking of You"; "I Kissed a Girl"	
December 10, 2008	WNCI Jingle Ball	Columbus	"Girls Just Want to Have Fun"; "Fingerprints"; "One of the Boys"; "Hot n Cold"; "Thinking of You"; "Waking Up in Vegas"; "I Kissed a Girl"	
December 11, 2008	Kiss 108's Jingle Ball	Lowell	"Hot n Cold"; "Waking Up in Vegas"; "Thinking of You"; "I Kissed a Girl"	
December 12, 2008	Z100 Jingle Ball	New York City	"Hot n Cold"; "Waking Up in Vegas"; "I Kissed a Girl"	
February 17, 2009	Sanremo Music Festival	Sanremo	"Hot n Cold"; "Don't Stop Me Now"	
February 21, 2009	2009 Echo Awards	Berlin	"Thinking of You"	
April 11, 2009	Special concert at House of Blues	North Myrtle Beach	"Fingerprints"; "Waking Up in Vegas"; "Mannequin"; "If You Can Afford Me"; "Thinking of You"; "Ur So Gay"; "Lost"; "One of the Boys"; "Hot n Cold"; "Self Inflicted"; "I'm Still Breathing"; "I Kissed a Girl"	
May 13, 2009	American Idol	Los Angeles	"Waking Up in Vegas"	
May 30, 2009	2009 MTV Video Music Awards Japan	Saitama	"Hot n Cold"	
June 1, 2009	2009 Pinkpop Festival	Landgraaf	"Fingerprints"; "Ur So Gay"; "Thinking of You"; "Waking Up in Vegas"; "Don't Stop Me Now"; "Hot n Cold"; "I Kissed a Girl"	
June 5, 2009	2009 Muz-TV Music Awards	Moscow	"One of the Boys"; "Hot n Cold"; "Waking Up in Vegas"; "Thinking of You"; "I Kissed a Girl"	
June 7, 2009	2009 Summertime Ball	London	"Hot n Cold"; "Waking Up in Vegas"; "I Kissed a Girl"	
June 13, 2009	2009 Caribana Festival	Nyon	"Hot n Cold"; "Waking Up in Vegas"; "Thinking of You"; "I Kissed a Girl"	
June 19, 2009	2009 Hurricane Festival	Eichenring	"I Kissed a Girl"; "Hot n Cold"; "Don't Stop Me Now"	
June 21, 2009	2009 Southside Festival	Neuhausen ob Eck	"Hot n Cold"; "I Kissed a Girl"; "Waking Up in Vegas"; "Don't Stop Me Now"	
July 4, 2009	2009 Rock Werchter	Werchter	"Fingerprints"; "One of the Boys"; "Hot n Cold"; "If You Can Afford Me"; "Ur So Gay"; "Thinking of You"; "Waking Up in Vegas"; "Don't Stop Me Now"; "I Kissed a Girl"	
July 11, 2009	T in the Park 2009	Balado	"Fingerprints"; "One of the Boys"; "Hot n Cold"; "If You Can Afford Me"; "Ur So Gay"; "Thinking of You"; "Waking Up in Vegas"; "Don't Stop Me Now"; "I Kissed a Girl"	
July 12, 2009	Oxegen 2009	Naas	"Fingerprints"; "One of the Boys"; "Hot n Cold"; "If You Can Afford Me"; "Ur So Gay"; "Thinking of You"; "Waking Up in Vegas"; "Don't Stop Me Now"; "I Kissed a Girl"	
July 22, 2009	MTV Unplugged	New York City	"I Kissed a Girl"; "Ur So Gay"; "Hackensack"; "Thinking of You"; "Lost"; "Waking Up in Vegas"; "Brick by Brick"	
July 24, 2009	Today	New York City	"Hot n Cold"; "Waking Up in Vegas"; "Thinking of You"	
August 22, 2009	2009 V Festival	Stafford	"Fingerprints"; "One of the Boys"; "Hot n Cold"; "If You Can Afford Me"; "Ur So Gay"; "Thinking of You"; "Waking Up in Vegas"; "Don't Stop Me Now"; "I Kissed a Girl"	
August 23, 2009	2009 V Festival	Chelmsford	"Fingerprints"; "One of the Boys"; "Hot n Cold"; "If You Can Afford Me"; "Ur So Gay"; "Thinking of You"; "Waking Up in Vegas"; "Don't Stop Me Now"; "I Kissed a Girl"	
September 13, 2009	2009 MTV Video Music Awards	New York City	"We Will Rock You" (with Joe Perry)	
November 5, 2009	2009 MTV Europe Music Awards	Berlin	"I Gotta Feeling"; "When Love Takes Over"; "Use Somebody"; "Halo"; "Poker Face"	
November 13, 2009	Showtime!	Manila	"Hot n Cold"	

=== 2010s ===
Date	Event	City	Performed song(s)
June 6, 2010	2010 MTV Movie Awards	Universal City	"California Gurls"
June 10, 2010	Le Grand Journal	Paris	"California Gurls"
June 20, 2010	2010 Much Music Video Awards	Toronto	"California Gurls"
June 28, 2010	The Graham Norton Show	London	"California Gurls"
July 31, 2010	MTV World Stage Live in Malaysia	Kuala Lumpur	"I Kissed a Girl"; "One of the Boys"; "Waking Up in Vegas"; "Thinking of You"; "Teenage Dream"; "Hot n Cold"; "Peacock"; "California Gurls"
August 3, 2010	2010 Singfest	Singapore	"I Kissed a Girl"; "One of the Boys"; "Waking Up in Vegas"; "Ur So Gay"; "Thinking of You"; "Teenage Dream"; "Lost"; "Hot n Cold"; "Peacock"; "California Gurls"
August 8, 2010	2010 Teen Choice Awards	Universal City	"Teenage Dream"
August 12, 2010	Special concert at The Plaza Ballroom	Melbourne	"One of the Boys"; "I Kissed a Girl"; "Teenage Dream"; "Thinking of You"; "Hot n Cold"; "Peacock"; "California Gurls"
August 24, 2010	Teenage Dream release party	New York City	"Hot n Cold"; "I Kissed a Girl"; "Teenage Dream"; "Thinking of You"; "The Unknown"; "Waking Up in Vegas"; "Firework"; "Peacock"; "California Gurls"
August 24, 2010	Late Show with David Letterman	New York City	"Teenage Dream"
August 27, 2010	Today	New York City	"I Kissed a Girl"; "California Gurls"; "Teenage Dream"; "Peacock"
August 28, 2010	The Album Chart Show	London	"I Kissed a Girl"; "California Gurls"; "Teenage Dream"; "Peacock"
August 30, 2010	Le Grand Journal	Paris	"Teenage Dream"
September 5. 2010	Postbahnhof	Berlin	"Hot n Cold"; "I Kissed a Girl"; "Teenage Dream"; "Thinking of You"; "The Unknown"; "Waking Up in Vegas"; "Firework"; "Peacock"; "California Gurls"
September 6. 2010	Alan Carr: Chatty Man	London	"Teenage Dream"
September 14, 2010	Special concert at Dos Pueblos High School	Goleta	"Hot N Cold"; "I Kissed a Girl"; "Waking Up in Vegas"; "Teenage Dream"; "Ur So Gay"; "Last Friday Night (T.G.I.F)"; "Firework"; "Peacock"; "California Gurls"
September 25, 2010	Saturday Night Live	New York City	"California Gurls"; "Teenage Dream"
October 1, 2010	Budapest Mix Festival (Note: Her performances in Budapest, Klub Stobola, and Arena Wien were part of her promo tour, the Teenage Dream Tour.)	Budapest	"I Want Candy"; "Hot n Cold"; "I Kissed a Girl"; "Waking Up in Vegas"; "E.T."; "Teenage Dream"; "Ur So Gay"; "Last Friday Night (T.G.I.F.)"; "Firework"; "Peacock"; "Not Like the Movies"; "California Gurls"; "Thinking of You"
October 2, 2010	Wetten, dass..?	Munich	"Teenage Dream"
October 5, 2010	Klub Stodoła	Warsaw	"Hot n Cold"; "I Kissed a Girl"; "Waking Up in Vegas"; "E.T."; "Teenage Dream"; "Ur So Gay"; "Thinking of You"; "Last Friday Night (T.G.I.F.)"; "Firework"; "Peacock"; "Not Like the Movies"; "California Gurls"
October 6, 2010	Mittwoch	Vienna	"Hot n Cold"; "I Kissed a Girl"; "Waking Up in Vegas"; "E.T."; "Teenage Dream"; "Ur So Gay"; "Last Friday Night (T.G.I.F.)"; "Firework"; "Peacock"; "Not Like the Movies"; "California Gurls"; "Thinking of You"
October 10, 2010	Music Box 2010	Hollywood	"Hot n Cold"; "Teenage Dream"; "Last Friday Night (T.G.I.F.)"; "E.T."; "Thinking of You"; "Firework"; "Peacock"; "Not Like the Movies"; "California Gurls"
October 17, 2010	The X Factor (United Kingdom)	London	"Firework"
November 7, 2010	2010 MTV Europe Music Awards	Madrid	"Hot n Cold"; "I Kissed a Girl"; "Firework"; "Teenage Dream"; "Peacock"; "California Gurls"
November 8, 2010	Special concert at Roseland Ballroom	New York City	"I Want Candy"; "Hot n Cold"; "I Kissed a Girl"; "Waking Up in Vegas"; "E.T."; "Teenage Dream"; "Ur So Gay"; "Last Friday Night (T.G.I.F.)"; "Firework"; "Peacock"; "Not Like the Movies"; "California Gurls"; "Thinking of You"
November 12, 2010	The Paul O'Grady Show	London	"Firework"
November 14, 2010	2009 BBC Radio 1's Teen Awards	London	"Hot n Cold"; "I Kissed a Girl"; "Teenage Dream"; "Firework"; "California Gurls"
November 21, 2010	American Idol	Los Angeles	"Firework"
November 30, 2010	Victoria's Secret Fashion Show 2010	New York City	"Firework" (Special Performance); "Teenage Dream"; "Hot n Cold"; "California Gurls"
December 1, 2010	The GRAMMY Nominations Concert Live! – Countdown to Music's Biggest Night	Los Angeles	"California Gurls"
December 5, 2010	KIIS FM's Jingle Ball	Los Angeles	"California Gurls"; "Hot n Cold"; "I Kissed a Girl"; "Firework"
December 8, 2010	The Ellen DeGeneres Show	Burbank	"Firework"
December 9, 2010	Kiss 108's Jingle Ball0	Lowell	"Hot n Cold"; "Teenage Dream"; "E.T."; "I Kissed a Girl"; "Firework"; "California Gurls"
December 10, 2010	Z100 Jingle Ball 0	New York City	"Hot n Cold"; "I Kissed a Girl"; "Firework"; "E.T."; "California Gurls"
February 13, 2011	53rd Annual Grammy Awards	Los Angeles	"Not Like the Movies"; "Teenage Dream"
April 21, 2011	American Idol	Los Angeles	"E.T."
May 1, 2011	Logie Awards of 2011	Melbourne	"Firework"
July 7, 2011	2011 Summerfest	Milwaukee	California Dreams Tour setlist
September 23, 2011	Rock in Rio 4	Rio de Janeiro	"Teenage Dream"; "Waking Up in Vegas"; "Peacock"; "I Kissed a Girl"; "Circle the Drain"; "E.T."; "Thinking of You"; "I Want Candy"; "Hot n Cold"; "Last Friday Night (T.G.I.F.)"; "Firework"; "California Gurls"
September 27, 2011	2011 Pepsi Music Show	Buenos Aires	California Dreams Tour setlist
October 16, 2011	The X Factor (United Kingdom)	London	"The One That Got Away"
November 20, 2011	American Music Awards of 2011	Los Angeles	"The One That Got Away"
February 4, 2012	2012 DirecTV Celebrity Beach Bowl	Indianapolis	"Teenage Dream"; "Hot n Cold"; "Waking Up in Vegas"; "Peacock"; "I Kissed a Girl"; "E.T."; "The One That Got Away"; "Thinking of You"; "Not Like the Movies"; "Firework"; "California Gurls"
February 10, 2012	2012 MusiCares Person of the Year	Los Angeles	"Hey Jude"
February 12, 2012	54th Annual Grammy Awards	Los Angeles	"E.T."; "Part of Me"
March 17, 2012	Let's Sing and Dance	London	"Part of Me"
March 20, 2012	Le Grand Journal	Paris	"Part of Me"
March 22, 2012	2012 Echo Awards	Berlin	"Part of Me"
March 31, 2012	2012 Kids' Choice Awards	Los Angeles	"Part of Me"
April 3, 2012	2012 Indian Premier League opening ceremony	Chennai	"Firework"; "California Gurls"
May 20, 2012	2012 Billboard Music Awards	Las Vegas	"Wide Awake"
June 9, 2012	2012 Summertime Ball	London	"Hot n Cold"; "Teenage Dream"; "Last Friday Night (T.G.I.F.)"; "Part of Me"; "Wide Awake"; "The One That Got Away"; "We Are the Champions"; "Firework"; "California Gurls"
June 17, 2012	2012 MuchMusic Video Awards	Toronto	"Wide Awake"
June 26, 2012	Pepsi & Billboard Summer Beats Concert	Hollywood	"Hot n Cold"; "Teenage Dream"; "Last Friday Night (T.G.I.F.)"; "I Kissed a Girl"; "Part of Me"; "Wide Awake"; "Firework"; "California Gurls"
July 4, 2012	Macy's 4 July Fireworks Spectacular	New York City	"Part of Me"; "Firework"
September 23, 2012	2012 Formula 1 Singapore Grand Prix	Singapore	"The Chain"; "Hot n Cold"; "Teenage Dream"; "Hummingbird Heartbeat"; "Waking Up in Vegas"; "Ur So Gay"; "Peacock"; "I Kissed a Girl"; "E.T."; "Part of Me"; "The One That Got Away"; "Wide Awake"; "Last Friday Night (T.G.I.F.)"; "Firework"; "California Gurls"
November 3, 2012	Obama Milwaukee Rally	Milwaukee	"Let's Stay Together"; "Teenage Dream"; "Part of Me"; "Wide Awake"; "Firework"
December 4, 2012	Carole King Tribute "You've Got a Friend"	Hollywood	"So Far Away"
December 8, 2012	Special concert in Dubai	Dubai	"Hot n Cold"; "Teenage Dream"; "Wide Awake"; "Firework"; "I Wanna Dance with Somebody (Who Loves Me)"; "California Gurls"
August 25, 2013	2013 MTV Video Music Awards	New York City	"Roar"
September 20, 2013	2013 iHeartRadio Music Festival	Las Vegas	"I Kissed a Girl"; "Dark Horse" (with Juicy J); "Part of Me"; "Wide Awake"; "California Gurls"; "Teenage Dream"; "Firework"; "Roar"
September 30, 2013	2013 iTunes Festival	London	"Walking on Air"; "California Gurls"; "Teenage Dream"; "I Kissed a Girl"; "Dark Horse"; "Part of Me"; "By the Grace of God"; "Wide Awake"; "Firework"; "Roar"
October 2, 2013	Le Grand Journal	Paris	"Roar"
October 12, 2013	Saturday Night Live	New York City	"Roar"; "Walking on Air"
October 20, 2013	The X Factor (United Kingdom)	London	"Roar"
October 22, 2013	iHeartRadio Presents: Prism	Burbank	"Roar"; "Dark Horse"; "This Moment"; "By the Grace of God"; "Unconditionally"
October 23, 2013	We Can Survive 2013	Hollywood	"I Kissed a Girl"; "Dark Horse"; "Part of Me"; "By the Grace of God"; "Walking on Air"; "California Gurls"; "Teenage Dream"; "Unconditionally"; "Firework"; "Roar"
October 25, 2013	Good Morning America	Lakewood	"Roar"; "Firework"; "Walking on Air"
October 28, 2013	The X Factor (Australia)	Sydney	"Roar"; "Unconditionally"
October 29, 2013	Sunrise	Sydney	"Roar"
November 16, 2013	Schlag den Raab	Cologne	"Roar"
November 24, 2013	American Music Awards of 2013	Los Angeles	"Unconditionally"
December 1, 2013	Infinite Music Event	Toronto	"Teenage Dream"; "Dark Horse"; "Part of Me"; "Firework"; "Unconditionally"; "Roar"
December 5, 2013	X Factor Italia	Milan	"Unconditionally"
December 7, 2013	2013 Jingle Bell Ball	London	"I Kissed a Girl"; "Dark Horse"; "Part of Me"; "Wide Awake"; "Walking on Air"; "California Gurls"; "Teenage Dream"; "Unconditionally"; "Firework"; "Roar"
December 13, 2013	The Voice of Germany	Berlin	"Unconditionally"
December 14, 2013	NRJ Music Awards	Cannes	"Roar"; "Unconditionally"
December 15, 2013	The X Factor (United Kingdom)	London	"Unconditionally"
December 20, 2013	The Ellen DeGeneres Show	Burbank	"Unconditionally"
December 20, 2013	Alan Carr: Chatty Man	London	"Unconditionally"
December 31, 2013	New Year's Eve special concert	Las Vegas	"Wide Awake"; "Roar"; "I Kissed a Girl"; "The One That Got Away"; "E.T."; "Firework"; "California Gurls"; "Part of Me"
January 26, 2014	56th Annual Grammy Awards	Los Angeles	"Dark Horse" (with Juicy J)
January 27, 2014	The Night That Changed America: A Grammy Salute to The Beatles	Los Angeles	"Yesterday"
February 19, 2014	2014 Brit Awards	London	"Dark Horse"
March 2, 2014	2014 U-EXPRESS LIVE	Saitama	"I Kissed a Girl"; "Dark Horse"; "Part of Me"; "California Gurls"; "Teenage Dream"; "Wide Awake"; "Hot n Cold"; "E.T."; "Walking on Air"; "Last Friday Night (T.G.I.F.)"; "Roar"; "Unconditionally"; "Firework"
May 25, 2014	2014 BBC Radio 1's Big Weekend	Glasgow	"Roar"; "Part of Me"; "Wide Awake"; "Dark Horse"; "I Kissed a Girl"; "The One That Got Away"; "Thinking of You"; "Unconditionally"; "Walking on Air"; "Teenage Dream"; "California Gurls"; "Birthday"; "Firework"
July 31, 2014	Katy Perry: Live at the White House	Washington, D.C.	"Roar"
February 1, 2015	Super Bowl XLIX halftime show	Phoenix	"Roar"; "Dark Horse"; "I Kissed a Girl" (with Lenny Kravitz); "Teenage Dream"; "California Gurls"; "Get Ur Freak On" (with Missy Elliott); "Work It"; "Lose Control"; "Firework"
February 8, 2015	57th Annual Grammy Awards	Los Angeles	"By the Grace of God"
June 20, 2015	Genentech Gives Back 2015	San Francisco	"Roar"; "Part of Me"; "Dark Horse"; "E.T."; "The One That Got Away"; "This Is How We Do"; "California Gurls"; "Teenage Dream"; "Firework"
July 24, 2015	Hillary Clinton 2016 presidential campaign	Orlando	"Roar"; "Part of Me"; "Dark Horse"; "E.T."; "The One That Got Away"; "Thinking of You"; "Unconditionally"; "This Is How We Do"; "California Gurls"; "Teenage Dream"; "Birthday"; "Firework"
July 26, 2015	So The World May Hear Gala	Saint Paul	"Roar"; "Part of Me"; "Teenage Dream"; "Unconditionally"; "Firework"
September 16, 2015	Worldwide Harper's Bazaar Bazaar Editors Event	New York City	"Roar"; "Teenage Dream"; "I Kissed a Girl"; "Dark Horse"; "Firework"
September 27, 2015	Rock in Rio 6	Rio de Janeiro	Prismatic World Tour setlist
October 24, 2015	Hillary Clinton 2016 presidential campaign	Des Moines	"Roar"; "Wide Awake"; "America the Beautiful"; "Firework"
November 10, 2015	Dubai Airport's Air Show Gala Dinner	Dubai	"Roar"; "Part of Me"; "Wide Awake"; "Dark Horse"; "I Kissed a Girl"; "Unconditionally"; "Walking on Air"; "This Is How We Do"; "Last Friday Night (T.G.I.F.)"; "Teenage Dream"; "California Gurls"; "Birthday"; "Firework"
February 24, 2016	SAP Convention	Wailea	"Roar"; "Part of Me"; "Wide Awake"; "Dark Horse"; "I Kissed a Girl"; "Unconditionally"; "Walking on Air"; "This Is How We Do"; "Last Friday Night (T.G.I.F.)"; "Teenage Dream"; "California Gurls"; "Birthday"; "Firework"
March 2, 2016	Hillary Clinton 2016 presidential campaign	New York City	"Roar"; "Part of Me"; "Wide Awake"; "Dark Horse"; "E.T."; "Unconditionally"; "Megamix Dance Party"; "Walking on Air"; "Teenage Dream"; "California Gurls"; "America the Beautiful"; "Firework"
May 19, 2016	amfAR's 23rd Cinema Against AIDS Gala	Cap d'Antibes	"Roar"; "Dark Horse"; "I Kissed a Girl"; "Teenage Dream"; "Firework"
July 28, 2016	2016 Democratic National Convention	Philadelphia	"Rise"; "Roar"
October 15, 2016	L.A. LIVE Event Deck	Los Angeles	"Roar"; "Teenage Dream"; "Dark Horse"; "Over the Rainbow"; "Firework"
November 5, 2016	Hillary Clinton 2016 presidential campaign	Philadelphia	"Nasty"; "Roar"; "Part of Me"; "Wide Awake"; "Dark Horse"; "America the Beautiful"; "Firework"
February 12, 2017	59th Annual Grammy Awards	Los Angeles	"Chained to the Rhythm" (with Skip Marley)
February 22, 2017	2017 Brit Awards	London	"Chained to the Rhythm"
March 5, 2017	2017 iHeartRadio Music Awards	Inglewood	"Chained to the Rhythm"
May 1, 2017	Met Gala	New York City	"Chained to the Rhythm"; "Teenage Dream"; "Firework"; "Dark Horse"; "Bon Appétit"
May 4, 2017	YouTube Brandcast	New York City	"Chained to the Rhythm"; "Teenage Dream"; "Firework"; "Dark Horse"; "Bon Appétit"
May 13, 2017	2017 Wango Tango	Carson	"Chained to the Rhythm"; "Teenage Dream"; "Firework"; "Dark Horse"; "E.T."; "Roar"; "Bon Appétit"
May 20, 2017	Saturday Night Live	New York City	"Swish Swish"; "Bon Appétit"
May 22, 2017	The Late Late Show with James Corden	Los Angeles	"Firework"; "I Kissed a Girl"; "Dark Horse"; "Bon Appétit"; "Swish Swish"; "Roar"
May 25, 2017	Special concert at Monto Water Rats	London	"Chained to the Rhythm"; "Teenage Dream"; "Firework"; "Dark Horse"; "E.T."; "Bon Appétit"; "Part of Me"; "California Gurls"; "I Kissed a Girl"; "Swish Swish"; "Roar"
May 27, 2017	2017 BBC Radio 1's Big Weekend	Kingston upon Hull	"Chained to the Rhythm"; "Bon Appétit"; "Teenage Dream"; "Firework"; "Dark Horse"; "E.T."; "Part of Me"; "California Gurls"; "I Kissed a Girl"; "Swish Swish"; "Roar"
June 3, 2017	The Voice (France)	Paris	"Chained to the Rhythm"; "Bon Appétit"
June 4, 2017	One Love Manchester	Manchester	"Part of Me"; "Roar"
June 8, 2017	Katy Perry Live: Witness World Wide	Los Angeles	"Witness"; "Hey Hey Hey"; "Power"; "Save as Draft"; "Thinking of You"; "Tsunami"; "Swish Swish"; "Chained to the Rhythm"
June 10, 2017	Katy Perry Live: Witness World Wide	Los Angeles	"Power"; "Witness"; "Hey Hey Hey"
June 12, 2017	Katy Perry Live: Witness World Wide	Los Angeles	"Chained to the Rhythm"; "Hey Hey Hey"; "Teenage Dream"; "Firework"; "Dark Horse"; "E.T."; "Save as Draft"; "Witness"; "Bon Appétit"; "Swish Swish"; "Power"; "Roar"
June 24, 2017	Glastonbury Festival 2017	Pilton	"Hey Hey Hey"; "Chained to the Rhythm"; "Witness"; "Teenage Dream"; "Firework"; "Dark Horse"; "E.T."; "Thinking of You"; "Save As Draft"; "California Gurls"; "I Kissed a Girl"; "Power"; "Swish Swish"; "Roar"
July 2, 2017	The Voice (Australia)	Sydney	"Chained to the Rhythm"; "Swish Swish"
August 27, 2017	2017 MTV Video Music Awards	Inglewood	"Swish Swish" (with Nicki Minaj)
March 29, 2018	Sukkiri	Tokyo	"Act My Age"
May 19, 2018	Witness: Coming Home	Santa Barbara	"Witness"; "Dark Horse"; "Chained to the Rhythm"; "Act My Age"; "Teenage Dream"; "Hot n Cold"; "Last Friday Night (T.G.I.F.)"; "California Gurls"; "I Kissed a Girl"; "E.T."; "Bon Appétit"; "Mind Maze"; "Wide Awake"; "By the Grace of God"; "Into Me You See"; "Power"; "Part of Me"; "Swish Swish"; "Roar"; "Pendulum"; "Firework"
May 21, 2018	American Idol	Los Angeles	"Part of Me"
June 30, 2018	2018 Rock in Rio Lisboa	Lisbon	"Witness"; "Roulette"; "Dark Horse"; "Chained to the Rhythm"; "Act My Age"; "Teenage Dream"; "Hot n Cold"; "Last Friday Night (T.G.I.F.)"; "California Gurls"; "I Kissed a Girl"; "Déjà Vu"; "E.T."; "Bon Appétit"; "Mind Maze"; "Wide Awake"; "Into Me You See"; "Power"; "Part of Me"; "Swish Swish"; "Roar"; "Pendulum"; "Firework"
September 16, 2018	KAABOO Del Mar	San Diego	"Witness"; "Roulette"; "Dark Horse"; "Chained to the Rhythm"; "Teenage Dream"; "Hot n Cold"; "Last Friday Night (T.G.I.F.)"; "California Gurls"; "I Kissed a Girl"; "E.T."; "Peacock"; "Bon Appétit"; "One of Us"; "Thinking of You"; "The One That Got Away"; "Part of Me"; "Swish Swish"; "Roar"; "Pendulum"; "Firework"
February 10, 2019	61st Annual Grammy Awards	Los Angeles	"Here You Come Again"; "Jolene"; "After the Gold Rush"; "Red Shoes"; "9 to 5" (with Kacey Musgraves, Dolly Parton, Miley Cyrus, Maren Morris and Little Big Town)
April 7, 2019	Capital One JamFest	Minneapolis	"365" (with Zedd); "Hey Hey Hey"; "Roulette"; "Dark Horse"; "Chained to the Rhythm"; "This Is How We Do It"; "Teenage Dream"; "Hot n Cold"; "Last Friday Night (T.G.I.F.)"; "California Gurls"; "I Kissed a Girl"; "E.T."; "Peacock"; "Bon Appétit"; "The One That Got Away"; "365" (with Zedd); "Part of Me"; "Swish Swish"; "Roar"; "Pendulum"; "Firework"
April 14, 2019	Coachella Valley Music and Arts Festival	Indio	"365" (with Zedd)
May 19, 2019	American Idol	Los Angeles	"Con Calma" (with Daddy Yankee); "Unconditionally" (with Jeremiah Lloyd Harmon)
August 20, 2019	Amazon Post-Prime Day Concert	Seattle	"Hey Hey Hey"; "Dark Horse"; "Chained to the Rhythm"; "This Is How We Do It"; "Teenage Dream"; "Hot n Cold"; "Last Friday Night (T.G.I.F.)"; "California Gurls"; "I Kissed a Girl"; "E.T."; "Peacock"; "Bon Appétit"; "Wide Awake"; "Never Really Over"; "Part of Me"; "Swish Swish"; "Roar"; "Firework"
September 18, 2019	The Ellen DeGeneres Show	Burbank	"Small Talk"
November 16, 2019	OnePlus Music Festival	Mumbai	"Chained to the Rhythm"; "Dark Horse"; "E.T."; "Bon Appétit"; "This Is How We Do It"; "Teenage Dream"; "Hot n Cold"; "Last Friday Night (T.G.I.F.)"; "California Gurls"; "I Kissed a Girl"; "Wide Awake"; "The One That Got Away"; "Harleys in Hawaii"; "Part of Me"; "Swish Swish"; "Never Really Over"; "Roar"; "Firework"
December 6, 2019	2019 Jingle Bell	Inglewood	"Cozy Little Christmas"; "Teenage Dream"; "I Kissed a Girl"; "Dark Horse"; "Harleys in Hawaii"; "Never Really Over"; "Roar"; "Firework"
December 7, 2019	2019 Jingle Bell	Rosemont	"Cozy Little Christmas"; "Teenage Dream"; "I Kissed a Girl"; "Dark Horse"; "Harleys in Hawaii"; "Never Really Over"; "Roar"; "Firework"
December 9, 2019	2019 Jingle Bell	St. Paul	"Cozy Little Christmas"; "Teenage Dream"; "I Kissed a Girl"; "Dark Horse"; "Harleys in Hawaii"; "Never Really Over"; "Roar"; "Firework"
December 13, 2019	OnePlus Music Festival	Mumbai	"Chained to the Rhythm"; "Dark Horse"; "E.T."; "This Is How We Do It"; "Teenage Dream"; "Hot n Cold"; "Last Friday Night (T.G.I.F.)"; "California Gurls"; "I Kissed a Girl"; "Wide Awake"; "The One That Got Away"; "Harleys in Hawaii"; "Part of Me"; "Swish Swish"; "Never Really Over"; "Roar"; "Firework"
December 15, 2019	Doha Exhibition and Convention Center	Doha	"Hey Hey Hey"; "Chained to the Rhythm"; "Teenage Dream"; "Hot n Cold"; "Last Friday Night (T.G.I.F.)"; "California Gurls"; "I Kissed a Girl"; "Dark Horse"; "E.T."; "Wide Awake"; "The One That Got Away"; "Harleys in Hawaii"; "Never Really Over"; "Part of Me"; "Swish Swish"; "Roar"; "Firework"

=== 2020s ===
Date	Event	City	Performed song(s)	Ref.
March 8, 2020	2020 ICC Women's T20 World Cup Final	Melbourne	"Roar"; "Firework"; "Teenage Dream"; "Hot n Cold"; "Last Friday Night (T.G.I.F.)"; "California Gurls"; "I Kissed a Girl"; "E.T."; "Dark Horse"; "Chained to the Rhythm"; "Wide Awake"; "Firework"	
March 10, 2020	The Project	Melbourne	"Never Worn White"	
March 11, 2020	Pioneer Park Recreation Reserve	Bright	"Hey Hey Hey"; "Chained to the Rhythm"; "Dark Horse"; "E.T."; "Teenage Dream"; "Hot n Cold"; "Last Friday Night (T.G.I.F.)"; "California Gurls"; "I Kissed a Girl"; "The One That Got Away"; "Part of Me"; "Wide Awake"; "Never Really Over"; "Swish Swish"; "Roar"; "Firework"	
May 9, 2020	SHEIN	—N/a	"Firework"; "Roar"; "Never Really Over"	
May 10, 2020	Disney's Family Singalong	—N/a	"Baby Mine"	
May 15, 2020	Amazon Music	—N/a	"Roar"; "Never Really Over"; "Daisies"	
May 15, 2020	Houseparty	—N/a	"Daisies"	
May 17, 2020	American Idol	—N/a	"Daisies"	
May 21, 2020	Radio.com	—N/a	"Daisies"; "Firework"; "Never Really Over"	
May 23, 2020	Good Morning America	New York City	"Daisies"; "Never Really Over"	
May 27, 2020	iHeart Living Room Concert	Los Angeles	"I Kissed a Girl"; "Roar"; "What a Wonderful World"; "Thinking of You"; "Daisies"	
June 7, 2020	Class of 2020	—N/a	"Daisies"; "Firework"	
June 25, 2020	Can't Cancel Pride	—N/a	"Daisies" / "I Kissed a Girl" / "Peacock" / "Walking on Air" / "Swish Swish"	
June 26, 2020	Coke Studio Sessions	Los Angeles	"Rise"; "Chained to the Rhythm"; "California Gurls"; "Teenage Dream"; "Hot n Cold"; "Never Really Over"; "Daisies"; "Part of Me"; "Harleys in Hawaii"; "Roar"; "Firework"	
July 25, 2020	Tomorrowland: Around the World	Boom	"Smile"; "Teenage Dream"; "California Gurls"; "Dark Horse" / "Chained to the Rhythm"; "Daisies" / "I Kissed a Girl" / "Peacock" / "Walking on Air" / "Swish Swish"; "Roar"; "Firework"	
November 22, 2020	American Music Awards of 2020	Los Angeles	"As the Deer"; "Only Love" (with Darius Rucker)	
November 30, 2020	The Disney Holiday Singalong	—N/a	"I'll Be Home for Christmas/Cozy Little Christmas"	
January 20, 2021	Inauguration of Joe Biden	Washington, DC	"Firework"	
March 26, 2021	Lazada Super Party	—N/a	"Roar"; "Cry About It Later"; "Dark Horse"; "Firework"	
May 24, 2021	American Idol	Los Angeles	"Thinking of You" (with Hunter Metts)	
May 31, 2021	Side By Side: A Celebration of Service	—N/a	"Roar"; "Resilient"; "Firework"	
July 31, 2021	Luisa Via Roma x UNICEF	Capri	"Teenage Dream"; "Roar"; "Dark Horse"; "I Kissed a Girl"; "Firework"; "Moon River" (with John Legend)	
September 30, 2021	Variety's Power of Women	Los Angeles	"What Makes a Woman"	
December 31, 2021	New Year's Eve Live	Las Vegas	"When I'm Gone"; "Walking on Air"	
January 29, 2022	Saturday Night Live	New York City	"When I'm Gone" (with Alesso); "Never Really Over"	
May 22, 2022	American Idol	Los Angeles	"Firework" (with Leah Marlene)	
August 27, 2022	NCL Norwegian Prima Christening	Reykjavík	"E.T."; "Chained to the Rhythm"; "Dark Horse"; "Part of Me"; "California Gurls"; "Hot n Cold"; "Last Friday Night (T.G.I.F.)"; "I Kissed a Girl"; "Swish Swish"; "When I'm Gone"; "Walking on Air"; "Wide Awake"; "Never Really Over"; "Teenage Dream"; "Smile"; "Roar"; "The Greatest Love of All"/"Firework"	
November 19, 2022	True Colors Festival	Tokyo	"Roar"; "Teenage Dream"; "Dark Horse"; "California Gurls"; "Firework"	
November 20, 2022	True Colors Festival	Tokyo	"Roar"; "Teenage Dream"; "Dark Horse"; "California Gurls"; "Firework"	
May 7, 2023	Coronation Concert	Windsor	"Roar"; "Firework"	
May 21, 2023	American Idol	Los Angeles	"I Still Need You"/"By the Grace of God" (with Haven Madison)	
December 20, 2023	VinFuture Prize	Hanoi	"Unconditionally"; "Roar"; "Firework"	
May 19, 2024	American Idol	Los Angeles	"What Makes a Woman" (with Jack Blocker)	
May 31, 2024	Anant Ambani and Radhika Merchant pre-wedding cruise party	Paris	"Teenage Dream"; "California Gurls"; "Dark Horse"; "Roar"; "The Greatest Love of All"/"Firework"	
July 4, 2024	Dolce & Gabbana private event	Pula	"Dark Horse"; "Swish Swish"; "Chained to the Rhythm"; "Walking on Air"; "I Kissed a Girl"; "Cry About It Later"; "California Gurls"; "Teenage Dream"; "Roar"; "Firework"	
August 23, 2024	EVITA Party	Los Angeles	"California Gurls"; "Woman's World"; "Lifetimes"; "Dark Horse"; "I Kissed a Girl"; "Crush"; "Nirvana"; "Gorgeous"; "Firework"	
September 11, 2024	2024 MTV Video Music Awards	New York City	"Dark Horse"; "E.T."; "I'm His, He's Mine" (with Doechii); "California Gurls"; "Teenage Dream"; "I Kissed a Girl"; "Firework"; "Lifetimes"	
September 20, 2024	Rock in Rio 10	Rio de Janeiro	"Woman's World"; "California Gurls"; "Teenage Dream"; "Part of Me"; "Dark Horse"; "Gimme Gimme"; "E.T."; "Swish Swish"; "Gorgeous"; "Bon Appétit"; "I'm His, He's Mine"; "Chained to the Rhythm"; "Never Really Over"; "Time After Time" (with Cyndi Lauper); "The One That Got Away"; "Tucked"; "Teary Eyes"; "Cry About It Later"; "Hot n Cold"; "Last Friday Night (T.G.I.F.)"; "I Kissed a Girl"; "Roar"; "Daisies"; "Wide Awake"; "Lifetimes"; "Firework"	
September 28, 2024	2024 AFL Grand Final	Melbourne	"Roar"; "Dark Horse"; "Gorgeous"; "California Gurls"; "Teenage Dream"; "I Kissed a Girl" / "Chains" (with Tina Arena); "Lifetimes"; "Firework"	
November 4, 2024	Kamala Harris Election Eve Concert	Pittsburgh	"Dark Horse"; "Part of Me"; "The Greatest Love of All"/"Firework"	
December 8, 2024	2024 Jingle Bell Ball	London	"Woman's World"; "California Gurls"; "Teenage Dream"; "Part of Me"; "Dark Horse"; "E.T."; "I'm His, He's Mine"; "I Kissed a Girl"; "Hot n Cold"; "Last Friday Night (T.G.I.F.)"; "Cozy Little Christmas"; "Roar"; "Lifetimes"; "Firework"	
December 13, 2024	2024 iHeartRadio Z100's Jingle Ball	New York City	"Woman's World"; "California Gurls"; "Teenage Dream"; "Part of Me"; "Dark Horse"; "E.T."; "I'm His, He's Mine"; "I Kissed a Girl"; "Hot n Cold"; "Last Friday Night (T.G.I.F.)"; "Cozy Little Christmas"; "Roar"; "Lifetimes"; "Firework"	
December 16, 2024	2024 iHeartRadio Q102's Jingle Ball	Philadelphia	"Woman's World"; "California Gurls"; "Teenage Dream"; "Part of Me"; "Dark Horse"; "E.T."; "I'm His, He's Mine"; "I Kissed a Girl"; "Hot n Cold"; "Last Friday Night (T.G.I.F.)"; "Cozy Little Christmas"; "Roar"; "Lifetimes"; "Firework"	
December 21, 2024	Katy Perry: Night of a Lifetime	London	"Woman's World"; "California Gurls"; "Teenage Dream"; "Part of Me"; "Dark Horse"; "E.T."; "I'm His, He's Mine"; "I Kissed a Girl"; "Hot n Cold"; "Last Friday Night (T.G.I.F.)"; "Cozy Little Christmas"; "The One That Got Away"; "Daisies"; "Roar"; "Wide Awake"; "Lifetimes"; "Firework"	
January 28, 2025	Le Gala des Pièces Jaunes	Paris	"Dark Horse" / "E.T."; "Teenage Dream"; "Roar"; "Lifetimes"; "Firework"	
January 30, 2025	FireAid	Los Angeles	"Rise" (with the Pasadena Chorale); "Roar"; "California Gurls"	
February 8, 2025	2025 Invictus Games	Vancouver	"Roar"; "Dark Horse"; "Part of Me"; "Lifetimes"; "Firework"	
April 5, 2025	2025 Breakthrough Prize	Santa Monica	"What a Wonderful World"; "Firework"	
December 9, 2025	Suez Canal Bank Exclusive Event	Giza	"Woman's World"; "California Gurls"; "Teenage Dream"; "Dark Horse"; "Hot n Cold"; "Last Friday Night (T.G.I.F.)"; "Wide Awake"; "The One That Got Away"; "Harleys in Hawaii"; "Chained to the Rhythm"; "How Will I Know"; "Never Really Over"; "E.T."; "Part of Me"; "Roar"; "Daisies"; "Lifetimes"; "Firework"	
December 31, 2025	2025 Bilibili New Year's Eve Gala	Suzhou	"Bandaids"; "Firework"	
January 17, 2026	2026 Joy Awards	Riyadh	"Roar"; "Dark Horse"; "Firework"	
April 18, 2026	2026 Vorwerk International Awards Night	Rome	"How Will I Know"; "Hot n Cold"; "Teenage Dream"; "Last Friday Night (T.G.I.F.)"; "California Gurls"; "Firework"; "The One That Got Away"; "Wide Awake"; "Roar"; "Never Really Over"; Harleys in Hawaii"; "Lifetimes"	
June 13, 2026	2026 FIFA World Cup	Los Angeles	"Wonder" (with Tius Luka)	
June 18, 2026	O Son do Camiño 2026	Santiago de Compostela	"California Gurls"; "Teenage Dream"; "Last Friday Night (T.G.I.F.)"; "Chained to the Rhythm"; "Never Really Over"; "Dark Horse"; "E.T."; "Part of Me"; "I'm His, He's Mine"; "Bon Appétit"; "Bandaids"; "Watch It Burn"; "Heads Will Roll"; "Legendary Lovers"; "The One That Got Away"; "Thinking Of You"; "Hot N Cold"; "I Kissed a Girl"; "Harleys in Hawaii"; "All the Love"; "Lifetimes"; "Wide Awake"; "Roar"; "Firework"	
June 20, 2026	Rock in Rio Lisboa 2026	Lisbon	"California Gurls"; "Teenage Dream"; "Last Friday Night (T.G.I.F.)"; "Chained to the Rhythm"; "Never Really Over"; "Dark Horse"; "E.T."; "Part of Me"; "I'm His, He's Mine"; "Bon Appétit"; "Bandaids"; "Watch It Burn"; "Heads Will Roll"; "Legendary Lovers"; "The One That Got Away"; "Thinking Of You"; "Hot N Cold"; "I Kissed a Girl"; "Harleys in Hawaii"; "All the Love"; "Lifetimes"; "Wide Awake"; "Roar"; "Firework"	
June 24, 2026	Malahide Castle	Malahide	"California Gurls"; "Teenage Dream"; "Last Friday Night (T.G.I.F.)"; "Chained to the Rhythm"; "Never Really Over"; "Dark Horse"; "E.T."; "Part of Me"; "I'm His, He's Mine"; "Bon Appétit"; "Bandaids"; "Watch It Burn"; "Heads Will Roll"; "Legendary Lovers"; "The One That Got Away"; "Thinking Of You"; "Hot N Cold"; "I Kissed a Girl"; "All the Love"; "Lifetimes"; "Wide Awake"; "Roar"; "Firework"	
June 30, 2026	Depot Live	Cardiff	"California Gurls"; "Teenage Dream"; "Last Friday Night (T.G.I.F.)"; "Chained to the Rhythm"; "Never Really Over"; "Dark Horse"; "E.T."; "Part of Me"; "I'm His, He's Mine"; "Bon Appétit"; "Bandaids"; "Watch It Burn"; "Heads Will Roll"; "Legendary Lovers"; "The One That Got Away"; "Thinking Of You"; "Hot N Cold"; "I Kissed a Girl"; "All the Love"; "Lifetimes"; "Wide Awake"; "Roar"; "Firework"	
July 1, 2026	Blenheim Palace Festival	Woodstock	"California Gurls"; "Teenage Dream"; "Last Friday Night (T.G.I.F.)"; "Chained to the Rhythm"; "Never Really Over"; "Dark Horse"; "E.T."; "Part of Me"; "I'm His, He's Mine"; "Bon Appétit"; "Bandaids"; "Watch It Burn"; "Heads Will Roll"; "Legendary Lovers"; "The One That Got Away"; "Thinking Of You"; "Hot N Cold"; "I Kissed a Girl"; "All the Love"; "Lifetimes"; "Wide Awake"; "Roar"; "Firework"	
July 3, 2026	Main Square Festival	Arras	"California Gurls"; "Teenage Dream"; "Last Friday Night (T.G.I.F.)"; "Chained to the Rhythm"; "Never Really Over"; "Dark Horse"; "E.T."; "Part of Me"; "I'm His, He's Mine"; "Bon Appétit"; "Bandaids"; "Watch It Burn"; "Heads Will Roll"; "Legendary Lovers"; "The One That Got Away"; "Thinking Of You"; "Hot N Cold"; "I Kissed a Girl"; "All the Love"; "Lifetimes"; "Wide Awake"; "Roar"; "Firework"	
July 5, 2026	Festival Río Babel	Madrid	"California Gurls"; "Teenage Dream"; "Last Friday Night (T.G.I.F.)"; "Chained to the Rhythm"; "Never Really Over"; "Dark Horse"; "E.T."; "Part of Me"; "I'm His, He's Mine"; "Bon Appétit"; "Bandaids"; "Watch It Burn"; "Heads Will Roll"; "Legendary Lovers"; "The One That Got Away"; "Thinking Of You"; "Hot N Cold"; "I Kissed a Girl"; "All the Love"; "Lifetimes"; "Wide Awake"; "Roar"; "Firework"	
July 8, 2026	Jazz Open Stuttgart	Stuttgart	"California Gurls"; "Teenage Dream"; "Last Friday Night (T.G.I.F.)"; "Chained to the Rhythm"; "Never Really Over"; "Dark Horse"; "E.T."; "Part of Me"; "I'm His, He's Mine"; "Bon Appétit"; "Bandaids"; "Watch It Burn"; "Heads Will Roll"; "Legendary Lovers"; "The One That Got Away"; "Thinking Of You"; "Hot N Cold"; "I Kissed a Girl"; "All the Love"; "Lifetimes"; "Wide Awake"; "Roar"; "Firework"	
July 9, 2026	Musilac Music Festival	Aix-les-Bains	"California Gurls"; "Teenage Dream"; "Last Friday Night (T.G.I.F.)"; "Chained to the Rhythm"; "Never Really Over"; "Dark Horse"; "E.T."; "Part of Me"; "I'm His, He's Mine"; "Bon Appétit"; "Bandaids"; "Watch It Burn"; "Heads Will Roll"; "Legendary Lovers"; "The One That Got Away"; "Thinking Of You"; "Hot N Cold"; "I Kissed a Girl"; "All the Love"; "Lifetimes"; "Wide Awake"; "Roar"; "Firework"	
July 11, 2026	Festival de Nîmes	Nîmes	"California Gurls"; "Teenage Dream"; "Last Friday Night (T.G.I.F.)"; "Chained to the Rhythm"; "Never Really Over"; "Dark Horse"; "E.T."; "Part of Me"; "I'm His, He's Mine"; "Bon Appétit"; "Bandaids"; "Watch It Burn"; "Heads Will Roll"; "Legendary Lovers"; "The One That Got Away"; "Thinking Of You"; "Hot N Cold"; "I Kissed a Girl"; "All the Love"; "Lifetimes"; "Wide Awake"; "Roar"; "Firework"	
July 12, 2026	Nancy Open Air	Maxéville	"California Gurls"; "Teenage Dream"; "Last Friday Night (T.G.I.F.)"; "Chained to the Rhythm"; "Never Really Over"; "Dark Horse"; "E.T."; "Part of Me"; "I'm His, He's Mine"; "Bon Appétit"; "Bandaids"; "Watch It Burn"; "Heads Will Roll"; "Legendary Lovers"; "The One That Got Away"; "Thinking Of You"; "Hot N Cold"; "I Kissed a Girl"; "All the Love"; "Lifetimes"; "Wide Awake"; "Roar"; "Firework"	
July 14, 2026	Luxembourg Open Air	Luxembourg City	"California Gurls"; "Teenage Dream"; "Last Friday Night (T.G.I.F.)"; "Chained to the Rhythm"; "Never Really Over"; "Dark Horse"; "E.T."; "Part of Me"; "I'm His, He's Mine"; "Bon Appétit"; "Bandaids"; "Watch It Burn"; "Heads Will Roll"; "Legendary Lovers"; "The One That Got Away"; "Thinking Of You"; "Hot N Cold"; "I Kissed a Girl"; "All the Love"; "Lifetimes"; "Wide Awake"; "Roar"; "Firework"	
July 16, 2026	Vieilles Charrues Festival	Carhaix-Plouguer	"California Gurls"; "Teenage Dream"; "Last Friday Night (T.G.I.F.)"; "Chained to the Rhythm"; "Never Really Over"; "Dark Horse"; "E.T."; "Part of Me"; "I'm His, He's Mine"; "Bon Appétit"; "Bandaids"; "Watch It Burn"; "Heads Will Roll"; "Legendary Lovers"; "The One That Got Away"; "Thinking Of You"; "Hot N Cold"; "I Kissed a Girl"; "All the Love"; "Lifetimes"; "Wide Awake"; "Roar"; "Firework"	
July 17, 2026	Lovely Brive Festival	Brive-la-Gaillarde	"California Gurls"; "Teenage Dream"; "Last Friday Night (T.G.I.F.)"; "Chained to the Rhythm"; "Never Really Over"; "Dark Horse"; "E.T."; "Part of Me"; "I'm His, He's Mine"; "Bon Appétit"; "Bandaids"; "Watch It Burn"; "Heads Will Roll"; "Legendary Lovers"; "The One That Got Away"; "Thinking Of You"; "Hot N Cold"; "I Kissed a Girl"; "All the Love"; "Lifetimes"; "Wide Awake"; "Roar"; "Firework"	
July 19, 2026	Lucca Summer Festival	Lucca	"California Gurls"; "Teenage Dream"; "Last Friday Night (T.G.I.F.)"; "Chained to the Rhythm"; "Never Really Over"; "Dark Horse"; "E.T."; "Part of Me"; "I'm His, He's Mine"; "Bon Appétit"; "Bandaids"; "Watch It Burn"; "Heads Will Roll"; "Legendary Lovers"; "The One That Got Away"; "Thinking Of You"; "Hot N Cold"; "I Kissed a Girl"; "All the Love"; "Lifetimes"; "Wide Awake"; "Roar"; "Firework"	
July 22, 2026	Isle of MTV 2026	Floriana	"California Gurls"; "Teenage Dream"; "Last Friday Night (T.G.I.F.)"; "Chained to the Rhythm"; "Never Really Over"; "Dark Horse"; "E.T."; "Part of Me"; "I'm His, He's Mine"; "Bon Appétit"; "Bandaids"; "Watch It Burn"; "Heads Will Roll"; "Legendary Lovers"; "The One That Got Away"; "Thinking Of You"; "Hot N Cold"; "I Kissed a Girl"; "All the Love"; "Lifetimes"; "Wide Awake"; "Roar"; "Firework"	
July 25, 2026	Paléo Festival	Nyon	"California Gurls"; "Teenage Dream"; "Last Friday Night (T.G.I.F.)"; "Chained to the Rhythm"; "Never Really Over"; "Dark Horse"; "E.T."; "Part of Me"; "I'm His, He's Mine"; "Bon Appétit"; "Bandaids"; "Watch It Burn"; "Heads Will Roll"; "Legendary Lovers"; "The One That Got Away"; "Thinking Of You"; "Hot N Cold"; "I Kissed a Girl"; "All the Love"; "Lifetimes"; "Wide Awake"; "Roar"; "Firework"	
July 31, 2026	Sunny Hill Festival	Pristina	"California Gurls"; "Teenage Dream"; "Last Friday Night (T.G.I.F.)"; "Chained to the Rhythm"; "Never Really Over"; "Dark Horse"; "E.T."; "Part of Me"; "I'm His, He's Mine"; "Bon Appétit"; "Bandaids"; "Watch It Burn"; "Heads Will Roll"; "Legendary Lovers"; "The One That Got Away"; "Thinking Of You"; "Hot N Cold"; "I Kissed a Girl"; "All the Love"; "Lifetimes"; "Wide Awake"; "Roar"; "Firework"	
