= Band Aid =

Band Aid may refer to:

- Band-Aid, a brand of adhesive bandage
- Band Aid (band), a charity supergroup from 1984
- Band Aid (Italian band), active in Italy in early 1980s
- "Band Aid", a 2009 song on Pixie Lott's album Turn It Up
- Band Aid (film), a 2017 American comedy drama
- Band Aid (EP), a 2024 EP by Day6
- "Bandaids" (song), a 2025 song by Katy Perry

== See also ==
- Adhesive bandage
- Bandage
- Live Aid, pair of charity benefit concerts in 1985
- Band Aid 20, charity supergroup formed in 2004
- Band Aid 30, charity supergroup formed in 2014
