= The Ones That Got the Plays =

Greatest hits album by Katy Perry
- Released: May 13, 2026
- Length: 79:55
- Label: Capitol
- Producers: Max Martin; Dr. Luke; Benny Blanco; Cirkut; Justin Tranter; Sean Cook; Eren Cannata; Stargate; Sandy Vee; Charlie Puth; Oscar Holter; Ali Payami; Greg Wells; Anton Zaslavski; Dreamlab; Shellback; Johan Carlsson

Katy Perry chronology
143 (2024)	The Ones That Got the Plays (2026)

The Ones That Got the Plays is the first greatest hits album by the American singer-songwriter Katy Perry. It was released on May 13, 2026, through Capitol Records. The compilation contains songs from Perry's albums One of the Boys (2008), Teenage Dream (2010), Prism (2013), Witness (2017), and Smile (2020), along with her 2025 single "Bandaids".

The Ones That Got the Plays has charted within the top ten in Ireland, New Zealand, and the United Kingdom. Within the lattermost, it has also received a Gold certification and accumulated 103,285 album-equivalent units.

== Background and release ==
In 2026, Katy Perry's 2011 song "The One That Got Away" began to experience a resurgence of popularity on the charts, due to going viral on social media. She subsequently released a director's cut version of the song's music video, as well as an extended play Thinking of the One That Got Away on April 22, containing the standard and acoustic versions of "The One That Got Away" and "Thinking of You" (2009), as well as her song "Legendary Lovers" from Prism (2013).

On May 13, 2026, Perry announced the release of The Ones That Got the Plays on her social media, describing the project as a "legendary playlist". The greatest hits album was released on the same day on various streaming services. It comprises 21 tracks from her second studio album One of the Boys (2008), up until her sixth studio album Smile (2020), and the 2025 standalone single "Bandaids", marking its first appearance on a Perry album. Writing for AOL, Samridhi Goel described The Ones That Got the Plays as a collection "celebrating some of Perry's biggest hits".

== Commercial performance ==
The Ones That Got the Plays debuted at number 117 on the US Billboard 200 on the chart dated May 30, 2026, moving 13,000 album-equivalent units. It marked Perry's eighth entry on the chart. With only two days of tracking, the record entered the Top 40 Album chart in New Zealand at number six. In its third week, it moved to number five, becoming her fifth top-five entry on the chart. In the United Kingdom, The Ones That Got the Plays debuted at number 13 on the UK Albums Chart for the week ending May 21, 2026. The compilation sold 6,580 units and was the seventh most-streamed album during the tracking week. During its eighth week, the album rose to number 10 on the chart with 6,623 units sold. It became Perry's sixth top-10 album on the chart. As of September 2026, The Ones That Got the Plays has received a Gold certification from the British Phonographic Industry (BPI), and has accumulated 103,285 album-equivalent units.

== Track listing ==
The Ones That Got the Plays track listing
No.	Title	Writer(s)	Original album	Length
1.	"The One That Got Away"	Katy Perry; Łukasz Gottwald; Max Martin	Teenage Dream (2010)	3:47
2.	"Last Friday Night (T.G.I.F.)"	Perry; Gottwald; Bonnie McKee; Martin	Teenage Dream	3:50
3.	"California Gurls" (featuring Snoop Dogg)	Perry; Gottwald; Benjamin Levin; Martin; McKee; Calvin Broadus	Teenage Dream	3:54
4.	"Teenage Dream"	Perry; Gottwald; Levin; McKee; Martin	Teenage Dream	3:47
5.	"Dark Horse" (featuring Juicy J)	Perry; Jordan Houston; Gottwald; Sarah Hudson; Henry Russell Walter; Martin	Prism (2013)	3:32
6.	"Legendary Lovers"	Perry; Martin; Gottwald; McKee; Walter	Prism	3:44
7.	"Bandaids"	Perry; Justin Tranter; Eren Cannata; Russell Chell; Amanda Ibanez; Sean Cook	Non-album single	3:08
8.	"Wide Awake"	Perry; Martin; Gottwald; McKee; Walter	Teenage Dream: The Complete Confection (2012)	3:40
9.	"Firework"	Perry; Mikkel S. Eriksen; Tor Erik Hermansen; Ester Dean; Sandy Wilhelm	Teenage Dream	3:49
10.	"Thinking of You"	Perry	One of the Boys (2008)	4:06
11.	"Roar"	Perry; Martin; Gottwald; Walter; McKee	Prism	3:42
12.	"Hot n Cold"	Perry; Gottwald; Martin	One of the Boys	3:40
13.	"I Kissed a Girl"	Perry; Gottwald; Cathy Dennis; Martin	One of the Boys	2:59
14.	"E.T."	Perry; Martin; Gottwald; Joshua Coleman	Teenage Dream	3:42
15.	"Part of Me"	Perry; Gottwald; McKee; Martin	Teenage Dream: The Complete Confection	3:35
16.	"Harleys in Hawaii"	Perry; Charlie Puth; Johan Carlsson; Jacob Kasher Hindlin	Smile (2020)	3:05
17.	"Never Really Over"	Perry; Daniel James; Gino Barletta; Dagny Sandvik; Hayley Warner; Leah Haywood; Jason Gill; Michelle Buzz; Anton Zaslavski	Smile	3:43
18.	"Unconditionally"	Perry; Martin; Gottwald; Walter	Prism	3:48
19.	"Bon Appétit" (featuring Migos)	Perry; Martin; Karl Johan Schuster; Oscar Holter; Kirsnick Khari Ball; Quavious Marshall; Kiari Cephus; Ferras	Witness (2017)	3:47
20.	"Chained to the Rhythm" (featuring Skip Marley)	Perry; Martin; Ali Payami; Skip Marley; Sia Furler	Witness	3:57
21.	"Waking Up in Vegas"	Perry; Desmond Child; Andreas Carlsson	One of the Boys	3:19
22.	"Birthday"	Perry; Martin; Gottwald; McKee; Walter	Prism	3:37
Total length:				79:55

== Charts ==
Weekly chart performance
Chart (2026)	Peak position
Canadian Albums (Billboard)	60
French Albums (SNEP)	177
Irish Albums (Official Charts)	8
New Zealand Albums (RMNZ)	5
UK Albums (Official Charts)	8
US Billboard 200	117

== Certifications ==
Certifications for The Ones That Got the Plays
Region	Certification	Certified units/sales
New Zealand (RMNZ)	Gold	7,500^{‡}
United Kingdom (BPI)	Gold	100,000^{‡}
^{‡} Sales+streaming figures based on certification alone.

== Release history ==
Region	Date	Format(s)	Label	Ref.
Various	May 13, 2026	Digital download; streaming	Capitol	
