= Legendary Lovers (song) =

2013 song by Katy Perry

Song by Katy Perry

from the album Prism
- Released: October 18, 2013
- Recorded: 2013
- Studio: Playback (Santa Barbara, California); MXM (Stockholm, Sweden); Luke's in the Boo (Malibu, California); Secret Garden (Montecito, California)
- Genre: Worldbeat; folk
- Length: 3:44
- Label: Capitol
- Songwriters: Katy Perry; Lukasz Gottwald; Max Martin; Bonnie McKee; Henry Walter
- Producers: Dr. Luke; Max Martin; Cirkut

"Legendary Lovers" is a song by American singer-songwriter Katy Perry from her fourth studio album, Prism, released on October 18, 2013, by Capitol Records. It is the album's second track, and was written by Perry herself, alongside Bonnie McKee, Cirkut, Dr. Luke, and Max Martin, while the latter three also handled its production. It is a worldbeat and folk song set to a danceable bhangra beat and is influenced by country music, while its instrumentation is composed of tablas, oriental strings, a coral sitar, and a double violin. Its lyrical content combines Eastern philosophy with mild sexual references, expressing "eternal passion" and also referencing the romances of infamous fictional characters and historical figures.

Upon the release of Prism, "Legendary Lovers" received generally mixed reviews from music critics, who praised its production but were ambivalent towards its lyrics. Following the song's resurgence on social media, specifically on TikTok in April 2026, alongside its appearance on Perry's debut compilation album The Ones That Got the Plays one month later, "Legendary Lovers" entered multiple charts worldwide, including Australia, Austria, the Czech Republic, Germany, Norway, Poland, Portugal, Slovakia, and Switzerland. The song's official remix, titled "Legendary Lovers (Save Me)" featuring American rapper Chief Keef, was released on May 29, 2026.

== Background and release ==
Perry told Entertainment Weekly in October 2013 that she penned "Legendary Lovers" through electronic mail, inspired by her then-boyfriend and American musician John Mayer. "We had a long courtship before anything was [public], just writing letters to each other — and seeing 'legendary lovers,' it sounded so nice", she commented on the song's development. "Some things float into my mind, and I process them, and [then] I make songs about them." The track was the second to be written by Perry and Bonnie McKee for the former's fourth studio album Prism (2013). The latter deemed the writing process "fun", and mused that the song was inspired by her own early "Eastern-influenced" material and "classic" Bollywood themes. McKee categorized it as a love song, despite recognizing it had a "could have been" feeling. She stated, "When you're writing love songs, it's always forever; they seem to always last throughout time."

The recording of "Legendary Lovers" took place at various studios, including Playback Recording Studios in Santa Barbara, California, MXM Studios in Stockholm, Sweden, Luke's in the Boo in Malibu, California, and Secret Garden Studios in Montecito, California. Serban Ghenea and mixing engineer John Hanes mixed the song at MixStar Studios, located in Virginia Beach, Virginia. Audio engineering was helmed by Peter Carlsson, Clint Gibbs, Sam Holland, and Michael Illbert; Rachael Findlen, Justin Fox, Elliott Lanam, and Cory Bice served as assistant engineers. Dr. Luke played coral sitar, Gingger Shankar played the double violin, Ronobir Lahiri played sitar and Aditya Kalyanpur played tabla. The track's producers Dr. Luke, Max Martin, and Cirkut programmed the instruments.

On October 16, 2013, "Legendary Lovers" leaked online, becoming the second song off Prism to leak after the album's lead single "Roar" leaked in August. The song was officially released alongside the album on October 22. In March 2014, Perry revealed to a fan that "Legendary Lovers" would be released as a single in 2014. On October 16, 2014, producer Max Martin published details of a track titled "Legendary Lovers (feat Drake)" on his production company Maratone Studios' website, sparking rumors that a remix of the song featuring Canadian rapper Drake would be released as a single. There was also speculation that the remix would be performed at Perry's Super Bowl XLIX halftime show in 2015. Capital FM commented on the potential remix that it would be "bound to be amazing", while Kevin Apaza from Directlyrics proclaimed that "Katy's new Hot 100 #1 seems to [be] on its way". Kenya Foy from Bustle reflected that "Legendary Lovers" has a stronger pop sound than Drake's previous work, but that some of Perry's verses remind of Drake's flow on Migos' "Versace" remix. In November 2014, PureCharts and Europe 2 pop radio reported that "Legendary Lovers" had received radio airplay for weeks in France, and that the French market acted as a "test zone" before deciding whether or not the song would be released as a single globally. Gingger Shankar, who played double violin for "Legendary Lovers", referred to the song as a single in January 2015.

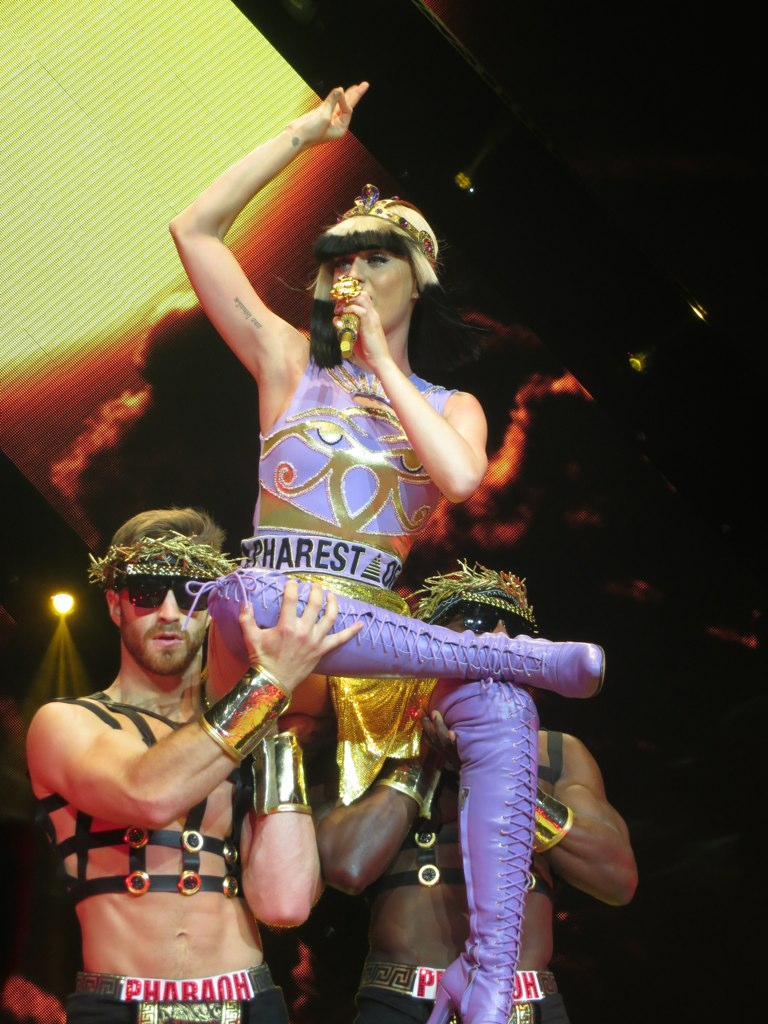
Perry performing "Legendary Lovers" on her Prismatic World Tour

Perry included "Legendary Lovers" on the set list of her 2014–2016 Prismatic World Tour. While performing the song, she showcased her dance skills through steps, turns, and lifts alongside two male dancers dressed as pharaohs. When a fan on TikTok thought about the possibility of the song being on the set list of the 2025 The Lifetimes Tour, Perry replied: "keep dreaming." Nevertheless, on a date of the tour in Birmingham she performed the song for the first time since 2015.

In April 2026, "Legendary Lovers" surged in popularity as it went viral on TikTok with mixes of rapper Chief Keef's song "Save Me" (2014), which samples the song. The resurgence was amplified by Perry's relationship with Justin Trudeau: after she shared photos with him on Instagram with the song's lyrics "Never knew karma could be so rewarding" as caption, fans dubbed them the real-life "legendary lovers" and launched a social media campaign petitioning for the song to be officially released as a single.

== Composition and lyrics ==
At a length of three minutes and forty-four seconds (3:44), "Legendary Lovers" is an exotic and "mystical" worldbeat and folk song, replete with sitars, tablas, a double violin and oriental strings. "Legendary Lovers" contains danceable heartbeat-resembling beats, a fast-sung pre-chorus, and anthemic chorus. Musically, it contains elements of country music, rock, synth pop and electronica. It is composed in the key of E minor and set in a 4/4 time signature at a metronome of 126 beats per minute. The melody spans the tonal range of B_{3} to E_{5}, while the music follows the chord progression of C—G—Em—D. Its bridge is characterised by a tribal-sounding instrumental percussion break, which was likened to Timbaland's works. At a listening party for Prism in September 2013, Perry described "Legendary Lovers" as having "a little bit of curry in it".

Lyrically, it discusses infinity and karma, and revolves around Eastern philosophy, which is used to describe the mystical kind of "eternal passion she and her man could experience", "being entranced and so intensely in love with this other person that their union will create something epic and indescribable". Perry makes references to historical and infamous characters, including Cleopatra and Romeo and Juliet protagonist Juliet, which are well known for their romances. In the chorus, Perry sings "Take me down to the river / Underneath the blood-orange sun / Say my name like a scripture / Keep my heart beating like a drum", which Jason Lipshutz from Billboard classified as the album's "most interesting chorus". John Walker from MTV Buzzworthy opined that "Legendary Lovers" was reminiscent of Perry's "Pentecostal upbringing", while Rob Harvilla from Spin deemed it a "Bollywood swipe" and a "boudoir jam".

== Critical reception ==
"Legendary Lovers" received mostly mixed reviews from music critics, who, despite praising the instrumentation and overall production, criticized its lyrical content. Helen Brown from The Daily Telegraph found the lyrics to be subpar to the "great, playfully exotic tune", describing them as being "of the level you might find in a day spa". Jon Dolan from Rolling Stone compared the song to works by Robyn and Lykke Li, stating that they "go for a darker, moodier intimacy", and that they "set stark revelations to torrential Euro splendor". Allison Stewart from The Washington Post described the lyrics as "one-size-fits-all spiritual catchphrases of someone who once read a self-help book in an airport". Odom Littleton from The Chimes News highlighted the song as an example of how Perry explores her personal experiences and shows herself on the album as she got married in India. Erik Anderson of Awards Watch called the song "probably one of the best" he had heard that year, complimenting its lively production and the anthemic melody of the chorus. Rolando Kahn from OnMilwaukee characterized the song as "hypnotizing", complimenting its drum beat: "you can't stop swaying to the beat".

Trent Wolfe from The Verge hailed the song's chorus, recognizing it as grand, and praised Dr. Luke for "transforming obscure sounds into popular ones". Glenn Gamboa from Newsday criticized "Legendary Lovers"' lyrical content, describing the song as "such a bad 'tribute' to Buddhism and Indian music that it's practically a joke, with lyrics like 'I feel my lotus bloom' and 'You are my destiny, my mantra'". Jason Lipshutz from Billboard acknowledged "unforgivingly clobbered" drums on the chorus. Mesfin Fekadu from ABC News stated that Dr. Luke, Max Martin, and Bonnie McKee did not "bring out the best Perry in the song," deeming it "forgettable." Jonathan Hamard from PureCharts characterized the song as "effective and made for the radio", while noting that it "has the potential to become the pop star's next hit". Música News felt the song is "catchy, perfectly radio-friendly" and has "a very oriental touch that offers an intriguing and original sound."

In 2015, Billboard picked "Legendary Lovers" as one of Katy's most underrated five songs, highlighting its "stellarly produced" instrumental that gives the song "a distinctive and memorable sound to complement Perry's emotional singing." In 2017, the editorial staff on Giornalettismo listed "Legendary Lovers" as one of five Katy Perry songs that could have been a potential hit, describing how "all fans wanted [it] as a single." Gay Times selected "Legendary Lovers" as a top-three standout track on Prism, reflecting how Perry "delivered banghra-inspired beats and soaring vocals to create one of [their] favourite songs from her career so far."

== Commercial performance ==
Upon the release of Prism, "Legendary Lovers" entered the US Pop Digital Songs at number 50, Belgium's Ultratip Bubbling Under (Wallonia) at number three, and the Dutch Top 40 at number 33. In South Korea, the track debuted at number 92 on the Gaon International Digital Chart, selling 2,330 digital downloads. All 13 tracks from Prism, with an additional three from the deluxe edition, made it onto the chart for that week. "Legendary Lovers" has been certified Gold by Pro-Música Brasil (PMB), for equivalent sales of 30,000 units in Brazil.

Following its surge in popularity on TikTok, the daily streams of "Legendary Lovers" on Spotify jumped by 1,449% compared to the previous week, reaching 456,000 streams on April 2, 2026. By early May, the song's daily global Spotify streams had increased by over 11,000%, reaching over 1.1 million, and by 13,200% in the United States. As a result, "Legendary Lovers" entered multiple charts worldwide, including Australia, Austria, the Czech Republic, Germany, Norway, Poland, Portugal, and Slovakia.

== Remix ==
"Legendary Lovers (Save Me)"
- Chief Keef remix cover

Promotional single by Katy Perry and Chief Keef
- Released: May 29, 2026
- Studio: Playback (Santa Barbara, California); MXM (Stockholm, Sweden); Luke's in the Boo (Malibu, California); Secret Garden (Montecito, California)
- Genre: Worldbeat; folk
- Length: 2:57
- Label: Capitol
- Songwriters: Katy Perry; Lukasz Gottwald; Max Martin; Bonnie McKee; Henry Walter
- Producers: Dr. Luke; Max Martin; Cirkut

In 2013, Perry and American rapper Chief Keef engaged in a brief Twitter feud after she commented on Keef's song "Hate Bein' Sober", tweeting her dislike for the song. Keef responded with a series of tweets threatening Perry and hinted that he would release a diss track aimed at her. Shortly afterward, the two recording artists reconciled. One year later, in 2014, he released "Save Me", which sampled "Legendary Lovers".

After the song's resurgence in early 2026, Keef and Perry released a remix of the song, with Keef singing a new verse. It was released as a single that same year, on May 29, nearly 13 years after the song's initial release. The remix blends Katy Perry's pop vocals with Chief Keef's raw rap style, creating a fresh, rhythmic dynamic.

=== Samples ===
- "Save Me", by Chief Keef (2014)
- "Presidential (Save Me)", by 41 (2025)

== Credits and personnel ==
Credits are adapted from the liner notes of Prism.

Recording

- Recorded and engineered at Playback Recording Studios in Santa Barbara, California, MXM Studios in Stockholm, Sweden, Luke's in the Boo in Malibu, California, and Secret Garden Studios in Montecito, California.
- Mixed at MixStar Studios in Virginia Beach, Virginia.

Personnel

- Lead vocals – Katy Perry
- Songwriting – Katy Perry, Lukasz Gottwald, Max Martin, Bonnie McKee, Henry Walter
- Production – Dr. Luke, Max Martin, Cirkut, Stukk
- Mixing – Serban Ghenea
- Mixing engineer – John Hanes
- Engineering – Peter Carlsson, Clint Gibbs, Sam Holland, Michael Illbert
- Assistant engineers – Rachael Findlen, Justin Fox, Elliott Lanam, Cory Bice
- Coral sitar – Dr. Luke
- Double violin – Gingger Shankar
- Sitar – Ronobir Lahiri
- Tabla – Aditya Kalyanpur
- Instrumentation and programming – Dr. Luke, Max Martin, Cirkut
- Production coordination – Irene Richter

== Charts ==
=== Weekly charts ===
Weekly chart performance
Chart (2013–2014)	Peak position
Belgium (Ultratip Bubbling Under Wallonia)	9
Netherlands (Dutch Top 40)	33
South Korea International (Gaon)	92
US Pop Digital Songs (Billboard)	50

Chart (2026)	Peak position
Austria (Ö3 Austria Top 40)	34
Czech Republic Singles Digital (ČNS IFPI)	29
Germany (GfK)	47
UK Streaming Chart	75
Global Excl. US (Billboard)	158
Greece International (IFPI)	87
Netherlands (Single Tip)	3
Norway (IFPI Norge)	62
Poland (Polish Airplay Top 100)	96
Poland (Polish Streaming Top 100)	33
Portugal (AFP)	117
Slovakia Singles Digital (ČNS IFPI)	72
Sweden Heatseeker (Sverigetopplistan)	7
Switzerland (Schweizer Hitparade)	59

==== "Legendary Lovers (Save Me)" ====
Weekly chart performance
Chart (2026)	Peak position
Australia (ARIA)	70
New Zealand Hot Singles (RMNZ)	7

== Certifications and sales ==
Certifications and sales for "Legendary Lovers"
Region	Certification	Certified units/sales
Brazil (Pro-Música Brasil)	Gold	30,000^{‡}
New Zealand (RMNZ)	Gold	15,000^{‡}
South Korea (Gaon)	—	2,330 (Note: South Korea first-week sales figures.)
United Kingdom (BPI)	Silver	200,000^{‡}
^{‡} Sales+streaming figures based on certification alone.

== Release history ==
Release dates and formats
Region	Date	Format(s)	Version(s)	Label	Ref.
Various	May 29, 2026	Digital download; streaming	Remix featuring Chief Keef	Capitol	
