= The Lifetimes Tour =

2025 concert tour by Katy Perry

- Tour by Katy Perry
- Promotional poster for the US dates.
- Location: Asia; Europe; North America; Oceania; South America
- Associated album: 143
- Start date: April 23, 2025
- End date: December 7, 2025
- No. of shows: 91
- Supporting acts: Rebecca Black; Cheat Codes; Mariana BO; Midnight Generation; Kinder; Goldie Boutilier; Au/Ra; Becky Hill
- Producer: Live Nation
- Attendance: 1.05 million
- Box office: $134 million
- Website: katyperry.com

Katy Perry concert chronology
- Play (2021–2023); The Lifetimes Tour (2025); Out of Office Tour (2026)

The Lifetimes Tour was the fifth concert tour by the American singer Katy Perry, in support of her seventh studio album, 143 (2024). The tour commenced at Mexico City's Arena CDMX on April 23, 2025, and concluded at Abu Dhabi's Etihad Park on December 7. Perry visited North America, South America, Asia, Europe, and Oceania. The tour consisted of 91 shows, and its supporting acts included musicians such as Cheat Codes, Becky Hill, and Rebecca Black, among others. It was Perry's first concert tour since Witness: The Tour (2017–2018).

The Lifetimes Tour grossed more than $134 million and sold 1.05 million tickets. In doing so, it became her second highest grossing tour behind the Prismatic World Tour (2014–2015). Perry's November shows at Accor Arena in Paris were recorded for a concert film, titled The Lifetimes Tour – Live from Paris. It was released on June 8, 2026, at the Tribeca Festival.

== Development ==
On September 25, 2024, Perry announced live on the Australian breakfast show program Sunrise that she would embark on the Lifetimes Tour, and released the dates for the first five shows in Australia. The ticket pre-sale and general sale were announced simultaneously. In April 2025, during her flight into space aboard Blue Origin NS-31, Perry revealed the set list of the tour on a butterfly-shaped piece of paper.

=== Show announcements ===
Following the announcement of the tour, additional shows in Sydney, Brisbane and Adelaide were announced, due to high demand, with the initial two shows in Adelaide being sold out within an hour. On October 3, 2024, Perry added one more show each in Melbourne, Perth, and Adelaide.

On November 11, Perry revealed the tour would visit South America with shows in Santiago, Chile, Buenos Aires, and Argentina taking place the following September. Two days later, shows in Brazil and Mexico were announced, with four total additional shows distributed between Mexico City, Monterrey and Guadalajara being added after the first dates sold out. Shows in the United Kingdom were announced on November 17, 2024, with one pound per ticket sold being donated to the Music Venue Trust. On November 21, 2024, Perry added a second show in London. That same month, concerts in Canada were announced, and an additional concert in Buenos Aires was added, due to demand.

On December 9, 2024, Perry announced eight European dates for the tour, ultimately with two extra concerts added in Paris due to demand. On December 16, 2024, Perry announced a Bologna, Italy, date, followed by the announcement of a Munich, Germany date on January 22, 2025, and a Lyon, France date on January 29, 2025. On January 27, 2025, concerts in the United States were announced, as well as a secondary date in Toronto, Canada. On February 6, 2025, Perry announced a Belfast, Northern Ireland, date, with a second Belfast show announced on February 14, 2025. On February 19, 2025, Perry announced a Hanover, Germany, date. The following day, dates labeled as the "final" Australian concerts were announced. On February 24, 2025, Perry announced Spain dates for the tour.

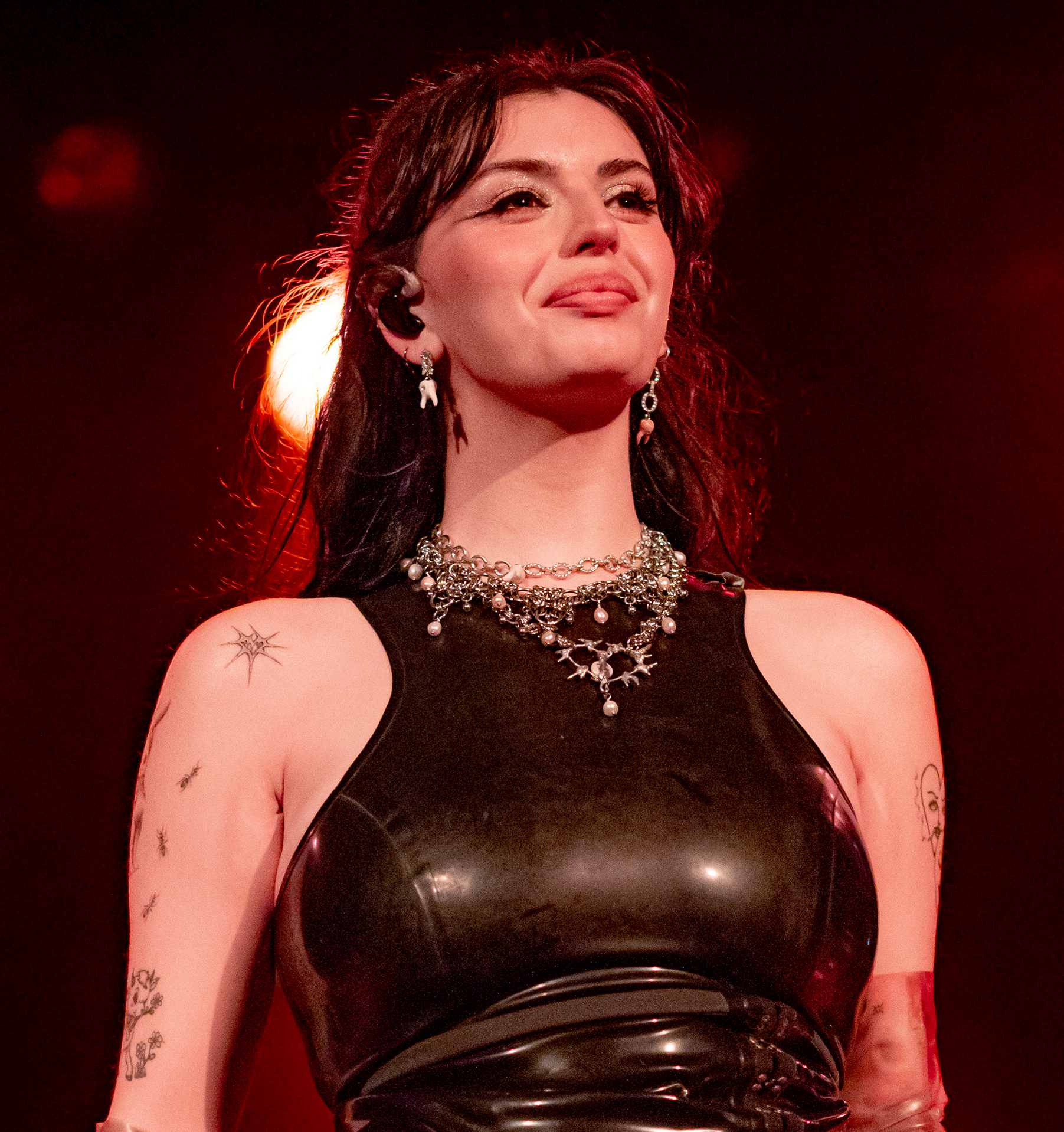
American singer Rebecca Black was announced as a supporting act for the tour (pictured).

Additionally, two concerts in Hangzhou, China, were announced on April 23, 2025. Three additional concerts in Asia were revealed by AEG Presents. On May 30, 2025, Perry announced two additional Brazil dates scheduled to take place in Curitiba and Brasília respectively on September 16 and 19 that year. A third Shanghai show and a second Saitama date were announced on July 16, 2025. The following day, a concert in Haikou, China, was announced.

=== Supporting acts ===
On March 9, 2025, it was announced Rebecca Black would serve as a supporting act for the tour. On April 23, 2025, Perry announced that Mexican DJ Mariana BO and Mexican band Midnight Generation will serve as the opening acts for the Mexican dates of the tour. In June 2025, Australian electronic dance music DJ duo Kinder were announced as the opening act for the Australian leg, followed in July by the announcement that American electronic music DJ and production trio Cheat Codes would be a supporting act on select dates in North America. On September 26, 2025, Perry announced opening acts for the UK and Europe legs, including Goldie Boutilier, Au/Ra and Becky Hill.

== Concert synopsis and production ==
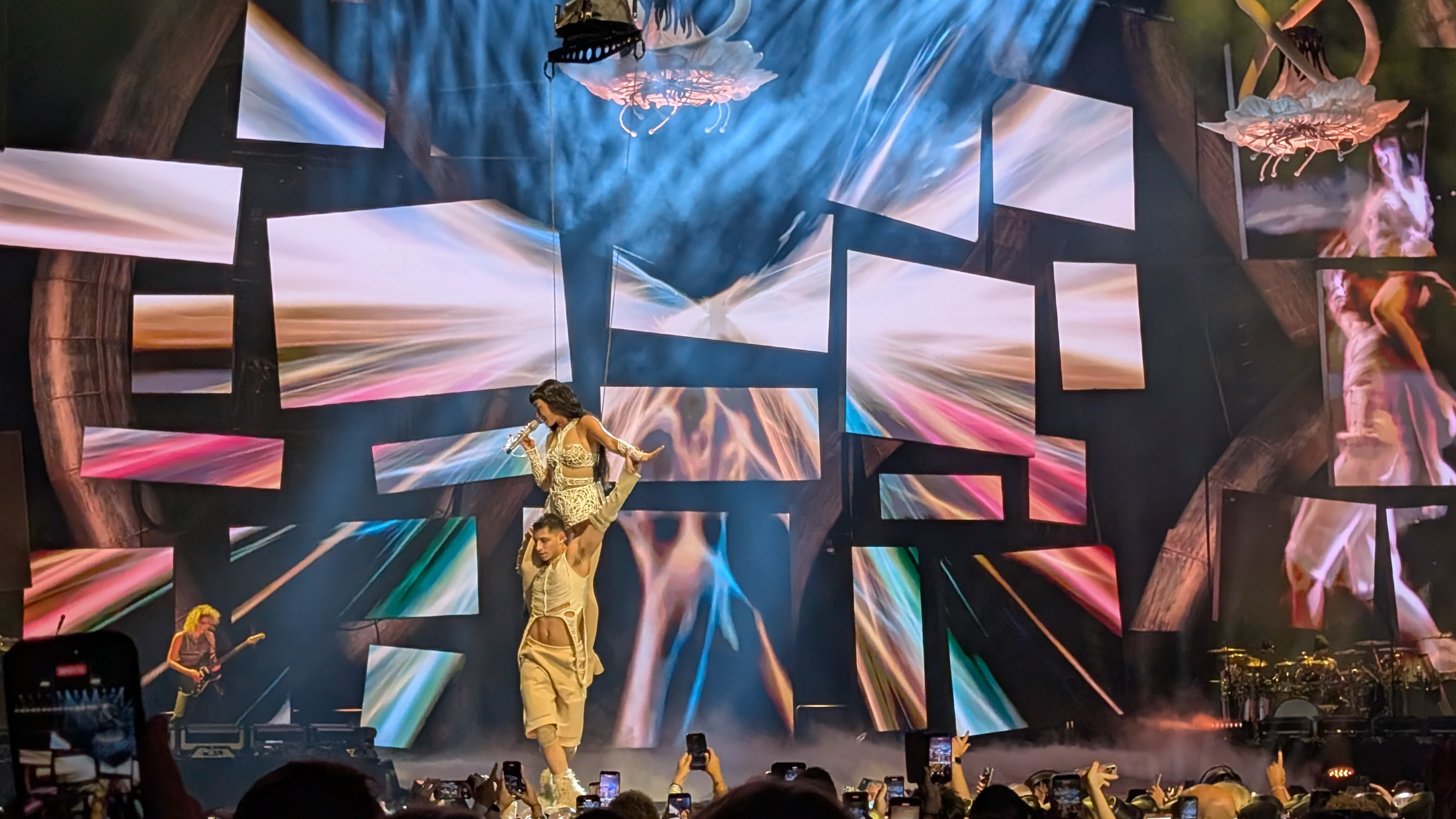
The stage for the tour, showing the multiple screens

The concert is set within a video game world, following Perry, a half-human, half-machine, in a battle against the artificial intelligence (AI) known as Mainframe. A narrated prologue reveals that the Mainframe has stolen the world's butterflies and that dogs are siding with cats over humans. During the show, she flies on wires, engages in a lightsaber battle and rides a metallic creature. The concert also features a "choose-your-own-adventure" segment, where fans can scan a QR code and vote on a song they want her to perform. During the segment, she wears an outfit inspired by the chosen song's era, which has included an outfit inspired by her 'Roar' music video, and another outfit inspired by her Witness era. Perry has described the show as a "sci-fi, hopeful video game" with "intense choreography", and likened it to a "travelling disneyland".

The tour's stage features 31 atypically positioned individual surfaces that make up the main LED screen, which show "animated videos of Perry's mission to free butterflies in order restore what was lost on her planet as a half human, half machine." There is an infinity-symbol shaped runway which takes up a large portion of the arena bowl, which is surrounded by dynamic lights that light up Perry and her dancers. The show's props include a "massive flying butterfly," and a 10-foot orb which "breaks apart and comes back together, holding Katy and ten dancers inside." There are also acrobats who perform on "hand-rolled metal flowers," and a lit-up saber pole which Perry uses to "fight off the warriors."

=== Costumes ===
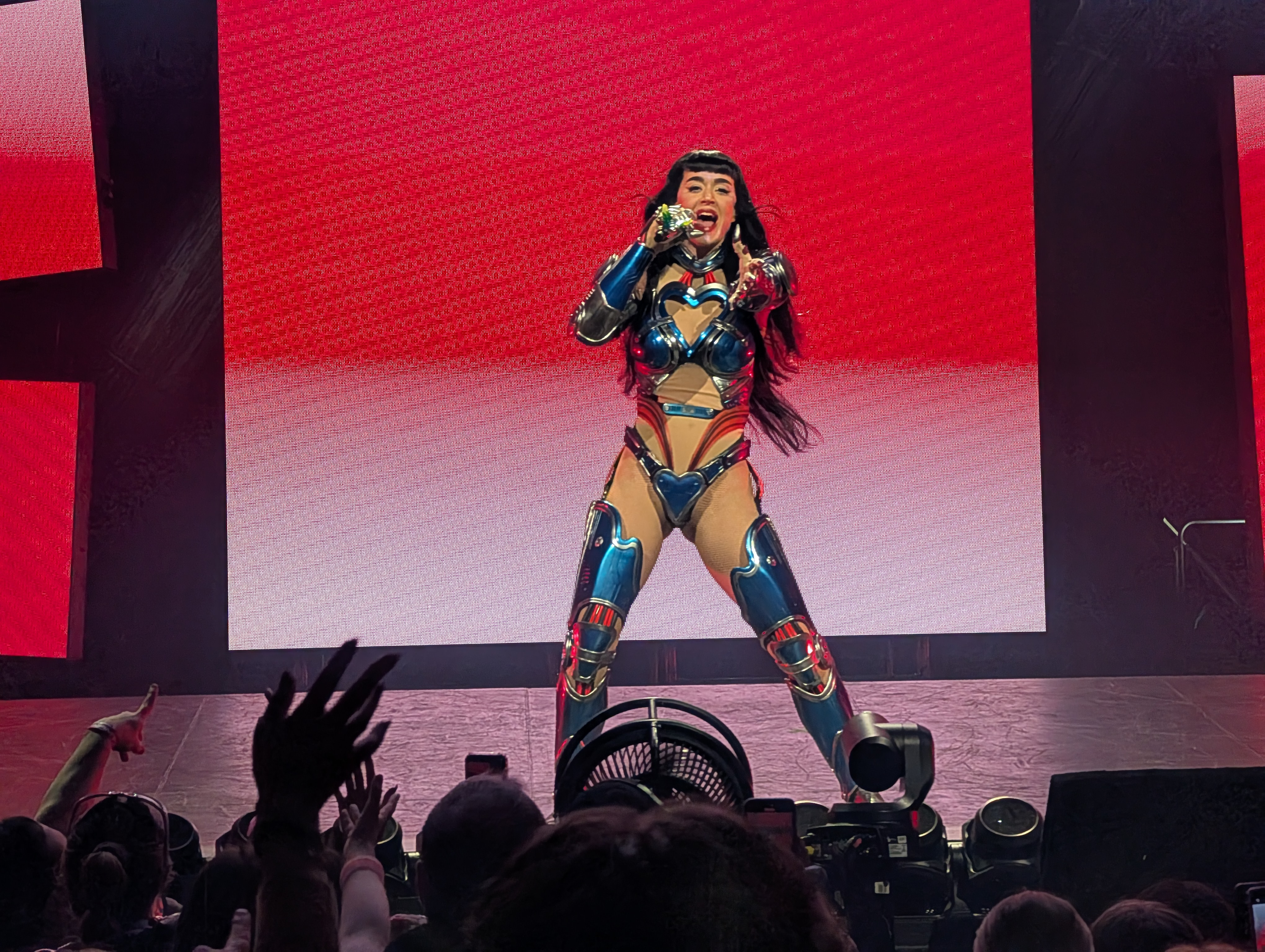
Perry's cyborg inspired outfit

During the concert, Perry wears various different costumes which are themed around the songs she performs. For one space-inspired look, Perry wears a futuristic two-piece ensemble which appears to be made of multi-colored metal. Another outfit makes reference to her song "E.T.", featuring a green bedazzled bodysuit that resembles an alien face with its cutouts and exaggerated hips. Perry seemingly references her Blue Origin space flight with an outfit featuring a cyborg-esque dark blue metallic suit of armor. The robotic design features metal legs, heart-shaped bottoms, arms cuffs and a high-neck bra top with a heart cut-out. Perry also makes reference to an outfit from her California Dreams Tour (2011–2012), as she wears a sheer gray latex mini dress complete with peppermint-shaped hip embellishments and a matching peppermint top. She paired the look with platform boots made to look like large blobs of pink cotton candy. Perry's final look features an avant-garde red bodysuit with dozens of dangling baubles of blue gems. The piece features levitating off-the-shoulder “sleeves,” and an ultra-deep neckline going down to her belly button. She paired the costume with silver knee-high boots and a red lip.

== Critical reception ==
=== North America ===
Commenting on the tour's opening night in Mexico City, Jo Vito of Consequence called the singer's choreography "unimpressive" and "middle-school-musical level." Vito said that Perry's presentation fell flat in comparison to then-recent concerts of other artists such as Lady Gaga and Taylor Swift. Vulture's Jason P. Frank noted that the show's concept of Perry fighting an evil AI makes allegations of her using AI "ironic." Local critics had warmer reception to the opening night in Mexico, with Juan Garza of ABC calling the visuals and technical presentation "impressive," while Nancy Chávez from Mexican digital news outlet, SinEmbargo, noted that "Katy Perry captivated Mexican audiences with her magic during her first night of her world tour."

Reviewing Perry's concert in Chicago, Selena Fragassi of the Chicago Sun-Times felt The Lifetimes Tour "suffers from much of the same issue" as the promoted 143 album, "where extravagance continues to supersede significance." She criticized it for its "dissociated vibe" and "cringe-y" moments. In a review for The Boston Globe, Victoria Wasylak called the concert great for families and praised Perry's vocals but felt the show was cheap as opposed to camp. She also did not like how much of the set list contained material from 143 while past songs that fans loved were cut short. Ross Raihala of St. Paul Pioneer Press called the show a "garish spectacle," saying the expensive production looked "cheap and chintzy." However, he felt that Perry's vocal performance remained strong throughout and that she made full use of her massive stage setup.

Minnesota Star Tribune's Chris Riemenschneider described the stage production as "hopelessly bloated and disjointed," and called the "lightsaber duel with some metal-armored aliens and low-rent-looking sandworms during 'E.T.'" as the concert's "most head-scratching" part. He however opined the tour "isn't as awful as the internet makes it out to be," as Perry's concerts had always been "goofy," and felt the singer's interactions with the audience were "sweet." Dallas Observer's Carly May Gravely recounted the show as "wildly entertaining, yet weird and unserious," reflecting Perry's own persona. She noted that the audience consisted largely of children under 12 and argued that criticism from detractors stemmed from a misunderstanding of the show's intended demographic. Gravely emphasized that Perry clearly understands and embraces her young audience, with each element of the performance designed to captivate them.

=== Oceania ===
Reviewing tour's stop in Melbourne, Denise Barnes of Rolling Stone Australia gave the concert three and a half out of five stars, saying it was "far from perfect, but was it a fun, feel-good night with a generational superstar still giving it her all." Karl Quinn of The Sydney Morning Herald gave the opening night in Melbourne four stars, describing the show as "spectacular" and "surprisingly intimate", and Perry as "for the most part, [singing] well." Quinn noted the importance of the "wall of screens" backdrop being "integral to the narrative" as it is where "the framing story unfolds." Writing for Mamamia, Bree Player gave the opening night in Sydney a positive review, describing it as "high-concept and high-effort" while praising the tour's visuals and Perry's costumes. In a review of the opening night in Brisbane, Georgia Clelland of The Courier-Mail noted the tour's unfavourable response from commentators, but described the show as a "high-octane, theatrical spectacle" that "silenced early critics," and left her "genuinely wowed." In a review of the opening concert in Adelaide, Patrick McDonald from The Advertiser described the show as an "epic spectacle" where Perry brought the "wow factor," and praised the "impressive" set.

=== Europe ===
In a review of the tour's stop at the OVO Hydro in Glasgow, Claire Biddles of The Guardian gave the show three out of five stars, commenting that the tour is "not the disaster that some have reported," but that it "[suffers] from Perry not allowing herself to have as much fun as her audience are having." Biddles described the tour's visuals and staging as "excessive," but complimented the moments when Perry sings alone as being the "most natural" and having "more energy and charisma than she has had all night." Fabio Magnocavallo from Euphoria gave the tour's opening night in London four out of five stars, describing the show as striking a balance "between theatrical flair and crowd‑pleasing hits" which made for a "lively, feel‑good evening." Magnocavallo praised the "Choose Your Own Adventure" segment, commenting that it "added a touch of spontaneity" and made everyone "feel more connected to the show." Additionally, he described the concert as a "grand pop production" and Perry's presence as "warm and engaging."

Writing for Le Progrès, Delphine Givord praised Perry's concert at the LDLC Arena in Lyon, describing it as a "two-hour dose of good vibes," where Perry "clearly enjoyed herself." Givord praised the "infinity-figure stage design," which she described as "[offering] an unobstructed view to all spectators," adding that the show was "meticulously choreographed" and Perry "gave it her all."

== Accolades ==
Name of award, year listed, category, and result
Award	Year	Category	Result	Ref.
Creative Loafing's Best of the Bay	2025	Best Over-the-Top Concert Extravaganza	Won	
Ticketmaster Awards (France)	2026	International Concert of the Year	Nominated	
Ticketmaster Awards (Ireland)	2026	Arena Gig of the Year	Nominated	
Ticketmaster Awards (Poland)	2026	Pop/Indie Pop/Dance Concert of the Year	Nominated	

=== Critic rankings and listicles ===
Name of publication, year listed, name of listicle, and result
Publication	Year	Listicle	Result	Ref.
The Daily Telegraph	2025	Biggest Pop and Rock Concerts of the Year	Placed	
USA Today	2025	Biggest Tours of the Year	Placed	

== Commercial performance ==
Dave Brooks from Billboard reported that the tour has generated $80 million from its North American and Australian shows, according to figures provided by Perry's management team. It was also reported that the shows at Hangzhou's Olympic Expo Center, Shanghai's Mercedes-Benz Arena and Haikou's Wuyuan River Stadium sold out one minute after going on sale. The Lifetimes Tour concluded with a gross of more than $134 million from 91 shows, with a total of 1.05 million tickets sold. It became Perry's second highest grossing tour behind the Prismatic World Tour (2014–2015).

== Concert film ==
Perry's November shows at Accor Arena in Paris were recorded for a concert film The Lifetimes Tour – Live from Paris, directed by Paul Dugdale and produced by Daniel Catullo. It premiered on June 8, 2026 at the Tribeca Festival. The film had a limited release in theaters across seventy countries on September 2, 2026.

== Set list ==
This set list is from the concert in Mexico City on April 23, 2025. It does not represent all concerts for the duration of the tour.

Level 1

1. "Artificial"
2. "Chained to the Rhythm"
3. "Teary Eyes"
4. "Dark Horse"

Level 2

5. "Woman's World"
6. "California Gurls"
7. "Teenage Dream"
8. "Hot n Cold"
9. "Last Friday Night (T.G.I.F.)"
10. "I Kissed a Girl"

Level 3

11. "Nirvana"
12. "Crush" (with elements of "Crush" by Jennifer Paige)
13. "I'm His, He's Mine"
14. "Wide Awake"

Level 3.5

15. Surprise song (Note: Performed as part of the "Choose Your Own Adventure" segment.)
16. Surprise song
17. "All the Love"

Level 4

18. "E.T."
19. "Part of Me"
20. "Rise"

Level 5

21. "Roar"
22. "Daisies" (remix)
23. "Lifetimes"
24. "Firework" (with elements of "Wonder")

=== Surprise songs ===
During each concert, Perry performed two songs from her discography, as part of a "Choose Your Own Adventure" segment, where audience members were given the opportunity to choose what songs Perry performed, via scanning a QR code during the concert.

- April 23, 2025 – Mexico City: "Not Like the Movies" and "The One That Got Away"
- April 25 and 26, 2025 – Mexico City: "Pearl" and "The One That Got Away"
- April 28, 2025 – Monterrey: "Not Like the Movies" and "The One That Got Away"
- April 29, 2025 – Monterrey: "Pearl" and "The One That Got Away"
- May 7, 2025 – Houston: "Not Like the Movies" and "The One That Got Away"
- May 9, 2025 – Oklahoma City: "Pearl" and "The One That Got Away"
- May 10, 2025 – Kansas City: "Not Like the Movies" and "The One That Got Away"
- May 12, 2025 – Chicago: "Pearl" and "The One That Got Away"
- May 13, 2025 – Minneapolis: "The One That Got Away"
- May 20, 2025 – Austin: "Not Like the Movies" and "The One That Got Away"
- May 22, 2025 – Dallas: "Pearl" and "The One That Got Away"
- June 4, 2025 – Sydney: "I'm Still Breathing" and "Thinking of You"
- June 7, 2025 – Melbourne: "Thinking of You"
- July 10, 2025 – Denver: "Not Like the Movies" and "The One That Got Away"
- July 12, 2025 – Phoenix: "The One That Got Away"
- July 13, 2025 – Anaheim: "Not Like the Movies" and "The One That Got Away"
- July 15, 2025 – Inglewood: "Not Like the Movies" and "The One That Got Away"
- July 18, 2025 – San Francisco: "Not Like the Movies" and "The One That Got Away"
- July 21, 2025 – Seattle: "Pearl" and "The One That Got Away"
- July 22, 2025 – Vancouver: "Not Like the Movies"
- July 30, 2025 – Montreal: "Not Like the Movies" and "The One That Got Away"
- August 3, 2025 – Detroit: "The One That Got Away"
- August 5, 2025 – Toronto: "The One That Got Away"
- August 8, 2025 – Boston: "Not Like the Movies"
- August 9, 2025 – Philadelphia: "Not Like the Movies" and "The One That Got Away"
- August 11, 2025 – New York City: "Not Like the Movies" and "The One That Got Away"
- August 15, 2025 – Baltimore: "Pearl" and "The One That Got Away"
- August 19, 2025 – Nashville: "Not Like the Movies" and "The One That Got Away"
- September 6, 2025 – Santiago: "Harleys in Hawaii" and "Never Really Over"
- September 9, 2025 – Buenos Aires: "What Makes a Woman" and "Never Really Over"
- September 10, 2025 – Buenos Aires: "Resilient" and "Never Really Over"
- September 14, 2025 – São Paulo: "Harleys in Hawaii" and "The One That Got Away"
- September 16, 2025 – Curitiba: "Only Love" and "Never Really Over"
- September 19, 2025 – Brasília: "Cry About It Later" and "The One That Got Away"
- October 4, 2025 – Belfast: "Ghost" and "Unconditionally"
- October 7, 2025 – Glasgow: "The One That Got Away" and "Double Rainbow"
- October 8, 2025 – Manchester: "Ghost" and "Unconditionally"
- October 10, 2025 – Sheffield: "Love Me" and "Unconditionally"
- October 11, 2025 – Birmingham: "Legendary Lovers" and "Unconditionally"
- October 13, 2025 – London: "Love Me" and "The One That Got Away"
- October 16, 2025 – Antwerp: "Unconditionally"
- October 17, 2025 – Hanover: "Double Rainbow" and "Unconditionally"
- October 19, 2025 – Copenhagen: "Love Me" and "The One That Got Away"
- October 21, 2025 – Berlin: "Unconditionally"
- October 23, 2025 – Cologne: "The One That Got Away" and "Unconditionally"
- November 7, 2025 – Lyon: "Ghost" and "The One That Got Away"

=== Miscellaneous ===
- At the second Monterrey show, Perry performed "Tucked" with a fan on stage.
- At the Houston show, during the level 3.5 act, Perry performed snippets of "Hummingbird Heartbeat", "Thinking of You", and "Simple".
- At the Kansas City show, Perry performed "Happy Birthday to You" for a concertgoer who was celebrating her birthday.
- At the Dallas show, Perry performed "Thinking of You".
- At the first Adelaide show, Perry performed "Swish Swish".
- At the Phoenix show, Perry performed an acoustic snippet of "Harleys in Hawaii".
- At the Anaheim show, Perry performed "Peacock" after "Last Friday Night (T.G.I.F.)", and "Save as Draft" during the level 3.5 act.
- At the Inglewood show, Perry performed snippets of "Pendulum", "It Takes Two", and "Double Rainbow".
- At the San Francisco show, between "Wide Awake" and "Not Like the Movies", Perry performed snippets of "Spiritual", "Legendary Lovers", and "Love Me".
- At the Vancouver show, during the level 3.5 act, Perry performed a snippet of "Lost".
- At the Montreal show, Perry performed "Peacock".
- At the second Toronto show, Perry performed a snippet of the Simlish version of "Last Friday Night (T.G.I.F.)".
- At the Boston show, Perry performed "Peacock".
- At the New York City show, Perry performed a snippet of "Unconditionally".
- At the first Buenos Aires show, Perry performed a snippet of the cover of "Don't Cry for Me Argentina" and an acoustic version of "The One That Got Away".
- At the second Buenos Aires show, Perry performed an acoustic version of "The One That Got Away".
- At the São Paulo show, between "Wide Awake" and "Harleys in Hawaii", Perry performed "Small Talk", "Hummingbird Heartbeat", "Peacock", and a medley of "Only Love", "Resilient", and "Never Really Over".
- At the Brasília show, between "Wide Awake" and "Cry About It Later", Perry performed "Choose Your Battles", a cover of Avril Lavigne's "I'm with You", and an a capella version of "Wonder".
- At the Glasgow show, between "Wide Awake" and "The One That Got Away", Perry performed "Witness".
- At the Manchester show, during the level 3.5 act, Perry performed "It Takes Two", "No Tears for New Year's", a cover of Kelly Clarkson's "I Do Not Hook Up", and an instrumental version of "Swish Swish".
- At the Sheffield show, between "Last Friday Night (T.G.I.F.)" and "I Kissed a Girl", Perry performed "Peacock".
- At the Birmingham show, between "Last Friday Night (T.G.I.F.)" and "I Kissed a Girl", Perry performed "Peacock".
- At the first London show, Perry performed "Peacock" between "Last Friday Night (T.G.I.F.)" and "I Kissed a Girl", and a snippet of "International Smile" between "Wide Awake" and "Love Me".
- At the Lyon show, Perry performed "Bandaids" for the first time.

== Tour dates ==
List of 2025 concerts
Date (2025)	City	Country	Venue	Supporting acts	Attendance	Revenue
April 23	Mexico City	Mexico	Arena CDMX	Mariana BO	49,239 / 49,239	$7,166,505
April 25	Mexico City	Mexico	Arena CDMX	Mariana BO	49,239 / 49,239	$7,166,505
April 26	Mexico City	Mexico	Arena CDMX	Midnight Generation	49,239 / 49,239	$7,166,505
April 28	Monterrey	Mexico	Arena Monterrey	Mariana BO	20,393 / 20,393	$2,848,598
April 29	Monterrey	Mexico	Arena Monterrey	Mariana BO	20,393 / 20,393	$2,848,598
May 7	Houston	United States	Toyota Center	Rebecca Black	9,613 / 9,613	$1,019,849
May 9	Oklahoma City	United States	Paycom Center	Rebecca Black	9,064 / 9,064	$1,032,158
May 10	Kansas City	United States	T-Mobile Center	Rebecca Black	11,215 / 11,215	$1,225,791
May 12	Chicago	United States	United Center	Rebecca Black	13,332 / 13,332	$1,977,074
May 13	Minneapolis	United States	Target Center	Rebecca Black	8,985 / 9,421	$1,065,431
May 17	Paradise (Note: Labeled as Las Vegas in promotional material.)	United States	T-Mobile Arena	Rebecca Black	7,198 / 9,131	$895,461
May 20	Austin	United States	Moody Center	Rebecca Black	9,705 / 9,705	$1,139,730
May 22 (Note: The May 22, 2025, concert was originally scheduled for the day prior, but was rescheduled due to a scheduling conflict with the 2025 Stanley Cup playoffs.)	Dallas	United States	American Airlines Center	Rebecca Black	11,703 / 11,703	$1,200,595
June 4	Sydney	Australia	Qudos Bank Arena	Kinder	42,520 / 42,520 (Note: The concerts in Sydney on June 4–10, 2025 had their data combined into a single boxscore.)	$4,998,585
June 7	Melbourne	Australia	Rod Laver Arena	Kinder	50,667 / 50,667 (Note: The concerts in Melbourne on June 7–14, 2025 had their data combined into a single boxscore.)	$6,025,012
June 9	Sydney	Australia	Qudos Bank Arena	Kinder		
June 10	Sydney	Australia	Qudos Bank Arena	Kinder		
June 12	Melbourne	Australia	Rod Laver Arena	Kinder		
June 13	Melbourne	Australia	Rod Laver Arena	Kinder		
June 14	Melbourne	Australia	Rod Laver Arena	Kinder		
June 17	Brisbane	Australia	Brisbane Entertainment Centre	Kinder	20,579 / 20,579	$2,444,338
June 18	Brisbane	Australia	Brisbane Entertainment Centre	Kinder	20,579 / 20,579	$2,444,338
June 22	Perth	Australia	RAC Arena	Kinder	26,914 / 26,914	$2,997,681
June 23	Perth	Australia	RAC Arena	Kinder	26,914 / 26,914	$2,997,681
June 26	Adelaide	Australia	Adelaide Entertainment Centre	Kinder	37,186 / 37,186	$4,364,619
June 27	Adelaide	Australia	Adelaide Entertainment Centre	Kinder	37,186 / 37,186	$4,364,619
June 29	Adelaide	Australia	Adelaide Entertainment Centre	Kinder	37,186 / 37,186	$4,364,619
June 30	Adelaide	Australia	Adelaide Entertainment Centre	Kinder	37,186 / 37,186	$4,364,619
July 10 (Note: The July 10, 2025, concert was originally scheduled for May 15, 2025, but was rescheduled due to a scheduling conflict with the 2025 NBA playoffs.)	Denver	United States	Ball Arena	Cheat Codes	10,450 / 10,450	$1,086,841
July 12	Phoenix	United States	PHX Arena	Rebecca Black	10,646 / 10,646	$1,379,169
July 13	Anaheim	United States	Honda Center	Rebecca Black	—	—
July 15	Inglewood	United States	Kia Forum	Rebecca Black	11,927 / 11,927	$2,067,834
July 18	San Francisco	United States	Chase Center	Rebecca Black	12,968 / 13,466	$1,891,571
July 21	Seattle	United States	Climate Pledge Arena	Rebecca Black	13,397 / 13,397	$1,799,335
July 22	Vancouver	Canada	Rogers Arena	Rebecca Black	13,482 / 13,482	$1,418,482
July 24	Edmonton	Canada	Rogers Place	Rebecca Black	14,323 / 14,323	$1,498,814
July 26	Winnipeg	Canada	Canada Life Centre	Rebecca Black	12,561 / 12,561	$1,281,464
July 29	Ottawa	Canada	Canadian Tire Centre	Rebecca Black	13,227 / 13,421	$1,325,864
July 30	Montreal	Canada	Bell Centre	Rebecca Black	14,784 / 14,784	$1,382,941
August 1	Quebec City	Canada	Centre Videotron	Cheat Codes	13,704 / 13,704	$1,402,791
August 3	Detroit	United States	Little Caesars Arena	Cheat Codes	12,770 / 12,770	$1,538,314
August 5	Toronto	Canada	Scotiabank Arena	Rebecca Black	28,075 / 28,075	$1,481,754
August 6	Toronto	Canada	Scotiabank Arena	Rebecca Black	28,075 / 28,075	$1,481,754
August 8	Boston	United States	TD Garden	Rebecca Black	13,204 / 13,204	$1,810,277
August 9	Philadelphia	United States	Wells Fargo Center	Rebecca Black	12,189 / 12,189	$1,695,384
August 11	New York City	United States	Madison Square Garden	Rebecca Black	13,968 / 13,968	$2,360,864
August 14	Newark	United States	Prudential Center	Rebecca Black	—	—
August 15	Baltimore	United States	CFG Bank Arena	Rebecca Black	10,317 / 10,317	$1,150,845
August 17	Raleigh	United States	Lenovo Center	Rebecca Black	11,893 / 11,893	$1,138,529
August 19	Nashville	United States	Bridgestone Arena	Rebecca Black	—	—
August 20	Atlanta	United States	State Farm Arena	Rebecca Black	10,293 / 10,293	$934,993
August 22	Tampa	United States	Benchmark International Arena	Rebecca Black	12,538 / 12,538	$1,685,190
August 23	Miami	United States	Kaseya Center	Rebecca Black	—	—
September 6	Santiago	Chile	Estadio Bicentenario de La Florida	—N/a	21,861 / 24,580	$1,906,050
September 9	Buenos Aires	Argentina	Movistar Arena	—N/a	22,940 / 22,940	$2,617,555
September 10	Buenos Aires	Argentina	Movistar Arena	—N/a	22,940 / 22,940	$2,617,555
September 14 (Note: The September 14, 2025, concert was a part of The Town.)	São Paulo	Brazil	Interlagos Circuit	—N/a	—N/a	—N/a
September 16	Curitiba	Brazil	Arena da Baixada	—N/a	28,541 / 29,986	$2,595,399
September 19	Brasília	Brazil	Estádio Nacional Mané Garrincha	—N/a	24,387 / 29,595	$2,143,280
October 4	Belfast	Northern Ireland	SSE Arena	Goldie Boutilier	18,512 / 18,512	$1,903,161
October 5	Belfast	Northern Ireland	SSE Arena	Goldie Boutilier	18,512 / 18,512	$1,903,161
October 7	Glasgow	Scotland	OVO Hydro	Goldie Boutilier	12,630 / 12,630	$1,504,652
October 8	Manchester	England	AO Arena	Goldie Boutilier	13,224 / 13,224	$1,656,351
October 10	Sheffield	England	Utilita Arena	Goldie Boutilier	10,995 / 10,995	$1,238,610
October 11	Birmingham	England	Utilita Arena	Goldie Boutilier	11,648 / 11,648	$1,373,396
October 13	London	England	The O_{2} Arena	Goldie Boutilier	27,995 / 27,995	$3,544,582
October 14	London	England	The O_{2} Arena	Au/Ra	27,995 / 27,995	$3,544,582
October 16	Antwerp	Belgium	AFAS Dome	Becky Hill	17,688 / 17,688	$2,073,374
October 17	Hanover	Germany	ZAG-Arena	Becky Hill	10,241 / 10,241	$1,055,900
October 19	Copenhagen	Denmark	Royal Arena	Becky Hill	—	—
October 21	Berlin	Germany	Uber Arena	Becky Hill	12,956 / 12,956	$1,393,100
October 23	Cologne	Germany	Lanxess Arena	Becky Hill	15,201 / 15,201	$1,777,751
October 24	Paris	France	Accor Arena	Becky Hill	44,289 / 44,289	$4,464,815
October 27	Budapest	Hungary	MVM Dome	Becky Hill	—	—
October 28	Kraków	Poland	Tauron Arena	Becky Hill	13,760 / 13,760	$1,274,357
October 30	Prague	Czech Republic	O_{2} Arena	Becky Hill	—	—
October 31	Munich	Germany	Olympiahalle	Becky Hill	—	—
November 2	Casalecchio di Reno (Note: Labeled as Bologna in promotional material.)	Italy	Unipol Arena	Becky Hill	13,535 / 13,535	$1,286,629
November 4	Paris	France	Accor Arena	Becky Hill		
November 5	Paris	France	Accor Arena	Becky Hill		
November 7	Décines-Charpieu (Note: Labeled as Lyon in promotional material.)	France	LDLC Arena	Becky Hill	12,910 / 12,910	$1,522,890
November 9	Barcelona	Spain	Palau Sant Jordi	Becky Hill	16,714 / 16,714	$1,562,570
November 11	Madrid	Spain	Movistar Arena	Becky Hill	15,399 / 15,399	$2,412,047
November 21	Hangzhou	China	Hangzhou Olympic Expo Center	—N/a	17,548 / 17,548	$2,983,468
November 22	Hangzhou	China	Hangzhou Olympic Expo Center	—N/a	17,548 / 17,548	$2,983,468
November 24	Shanghai	China	Mercedes-Benz Arena	—N/a	29,583 / 29,583	$4,362,328
November 25	Shanghai	China	Mercedes-Benz Arena	—N/a	29,583 / 29,583	$4,362,328
November 26	Shanghai	China	Mercedes-Benz Arena	—N/a	29,583 / 29,583	$4,362,328
November 29	Haikou	China	Wuyuan River Stadium	—N/a	22,876 / 22,876	$3,231,395
December 3	Saitama (Note: Labeled as Tokyo in promotional material.)	Japan	Saitama Super Arena	—N/a	20,393 / 20,393	$2,616,789
December 7 (Note: The December 7, 2025, concert was a part of Abu Dhabi Grand Prix After Race Concerts.)	Abu Dhabi	United Arab Emirates	Etihad Park	—N/a	—	—
Total					530,951 / 543,384 (97.7%)	$62,161,111

=== Canceled shows ===
List of canceled concerts
Date (2025)	City	Country	Venue	Reason	Ref.
May 1	Guadalajara	Mexico	Arena Guadalajara	Unfinished venue	
May 2	Guadalajara	Mexico	Arena Guadalajara	Unfinished venue	

== Notes ==
Cities

Others
