= Band Aid (Italian band) =

Italian band formed in 1980

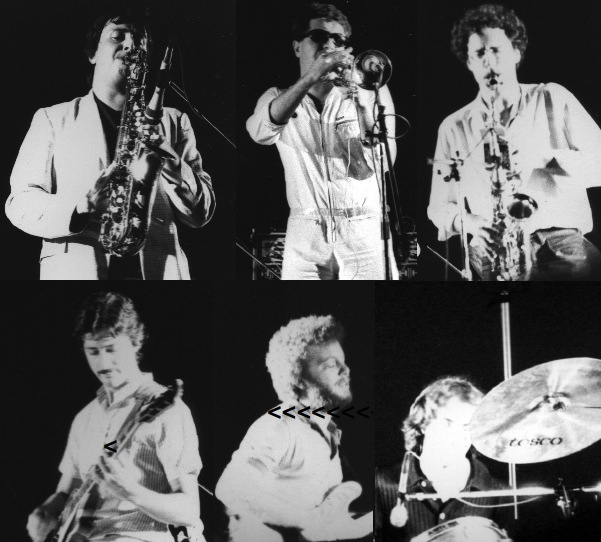
- Band Aid, (1981).

Background information
- Origin: Lecce, Italy
- Genres: Italo disco, free jazz, jazz-rock, experimental rock, no wave, punk jazz
- Years active: 1980–1985; 2021; 2024
- Labels: Streetz, Italian Service!
- Past members: Frank Nemola; Mino Toriano; Roberto Gagliardi; Toni Robertini; Felice De Donno; Paolo Cesano; Luciano Graffi; Mirko Pellati; Fabio Sorti; Ignazio Orlando; Sergio Piccinini; Arthur Miles

Band Aid was an Italian band formed in Lecce in 1980.

== History ==
Band Aid was formed in 1980 in Lecce by Toni Robertini, Giacomo Toriano (Mino), Francesco Nemola (Frank), Felice De Donno, Roberto Gagliardi and Paolo Cesano. It was previously named La Mela d'Oro, a group which in 1976 had already elaborated Mediterranean Jazz with elements of popular music of Salento. The group was influenced by Canterbury scene, no wave, Frank Zappa and free jazz. They produced their own instrumental compositions except during the last period when the American singer Arthur Miles joined the band.

In 1980, Band Aid was the first Italian band to self-produce an LP (No Autostop) following the English example. Recorded at home on a 4-track tape recorder, the LP was published by Italian Records Service. The group defined its musical style as "No-Jazz".

In 1981, they moved to Bologna and recorded their second LP, Due, published by Italian Records. They took part in the festival Electra 1 in Bologna, with Bauhaus, Peter Gordon, Lounge Lizards, DNA and Magazzini Criminali.

Band Aid's music, instrumental and not inclined to the usual rock styles (except for the rhythm), is a singular presence in the new wave scene. In 1983, they took part in five episodes of RAI-Radio3 "Un certo discorso", performing live. They toured Sardinia with Litfiba for a promotional tour of new Italian music.

Following the Italian Records' trend towards dance music and Italo disco, they recorded the EP A Tour in Italy, produced by Oderso Rubini. They introduced vocals for the first time, using pre-recorded conversations of English lessons and a nonsense rap in French. Side B is a remix by the American DJ, Tony Carrasco. The record obtained reasonable success. The last period is marked by an attempt to reach a larger audience. In 1985, the band dissolved.

In 1993 was published "Live Tree" a CD containing unpublished music recorded live.

In 2019 Mino Toriano begins the composition and the production of the new album BandAid 2020 (released in 2021) featuring Roberto Gagliardi, Felice De Donno, Frank Nemola (and also Toni Robertini by digital editing of previous audio recordings).

In December 2024 the band comes back with a live concert in Lecce.

== Past members ==
- Mino Toriano – guitar, bass
- Frank Nemola – trumpet, synthesizer
- Toni Robertini, Roberto Gagliardi – saxophone, flute
- Felice De Donno – bass
- Luciano Graffi – bass
- Ignazio Orlando – bass
- Paolo Cesano – drums
- Fabio Sorti – drums
- Sergio Piccinini – drums
- Arthur Miles – vocals
- Giovanni Chirico – saxophone
- Massimiliano Ingrosso – drums

== Discography ==
=== Albums ===
- 1980 – No Autostop (Italian Records Service, TIXE 002)
- 1981 – Due (Italian Records, EXIT 908)
- 1983 – A Tour in Italy (EP, 12") (Italian Records, EXIT M506)
- 1993 – Live Tree (CD, live album) (CV, BA01)
- 2021 – 2020 (CD) (Streetz Records, BA001)

=== Singles ===
- 1983 – "A Tour in Italy" (7") (Bellaphone Germany, 100–07–298)
