= As the Deer =

Praise and worship hymn song by Martin J. Nystrom written in 1981

"'As the Deer" is a praise and worship hymn song by Martin J. Nystrom, a native of Seattle. Written in 1984, this song is based on Psalm 42:1;

"As the deer panteth for the water, so my soul longeth after Thee; You alone are my heart's desire, and I long to worship Thee"

Though Nystrom had not intended to perform the song publicly, he shared it with a friend at the Christ for the Nations Institute before returning to Seattle. His friend introduced it to the others at the institute, and it gained popularity.
