= Bandaids (song) =

Single by Katy Perry
- Released: November 6, 2025
- Genre: Pop rock
- Length: 3:08
- Label: Capitol
- Songwriters: Katy Perry; Justin Tranter; Sean Cook; Russ Chell; Eren Cannata; Amanda "Kiddo A.I." Ibanez
- Producers: Justin Tranter; Sean Cook; Russ Chell; Eren Cannata

Katy Perry singles chronology
"OK" (2024)	"Bandaids" (2025)	"Watch It Burn" (2026)

Music video
- "Bandaids" on YouTube

"Bandaids" (stylized in all lowercase) is a song by the American singer-songwriter Katy Perry. It was released through Capitol Records on November 6, 2025, along with an accompanying music video, which she co-directed with Christian Breslauer. The song was later included on her greatest hits album, The Ones That Got the Plays (2026). Perry and Amanda Ibanez co-wrote the track with its producers Justin Tranter, Sean Cook, Russ Chell, and Eren Cannata. "Bandaids" is a pop rock ballad, which lyrically explores heartbreak and reflects on the loss of a relationship.

Commercially, "Bandaids" entered the primary charts in Australia, Canada, Ireland, the United Kingdom, and Venezuela. In Brazil, the song has been certified Gold by Pro-Música Brasil for shifting 20,000 units within the country. The track's accompanying music video depicts Perry going through a series of accidents that show her struggling after a breakup, inspired by the American horror franchise Final Destination. She first performed the song live on her 2025 concert tour, The Lifetimes Tour, at a show in Lyon, France, one day after its release.

== Promotion and release ==
In November 2025, reports surfaced of a soundless visualizer being displayed on the screens at one point during The Lifetimes Tour shows. In the cryptic video, Perry was seen singing an unidentified song while sitting on a tree branch and cutting it with a hand saw. On November 4, 2025, she hinted at a new project on her official website by updating its design. The update featured three emojis—🙂, 😐, and ☹️—and included the message "how's your day?". There was also an option to subscribe to her newsletter and an invitation to pre-save future projects. Later that day, Perry announced the release of a new single titled "Bandaids" on her social media, with a photo of her face containing scratches and bruises on her forehead, cheek, lip, and nose. The image also featured the song's title and its release date, November 6. The song was later included on Perry's compilation album titled The Ones That Got the Plays, released in May 2026.

== Composition ==
"Bandaids"
A 11-second audio sample of "Bandaids", featuring Perry singing the opening line of the song.

Perry and Amanda Ibanez co-wrote "Bandaids" with its producers Justin Tranter, Sean Cook, Russ Chell, and Eren Cannata. The track is a pop rock ballad which features "metallic, shimmery guitars" and a "semi-anthemic climax", with a runtime of three minutes and eight seconds. "Bandaids" is written in the key of A-flat major with a tempo of 94 beats per minute. Lyrically, the track is about heartbreak and losing someone Perry loved. Her opening line declares, "Hand to God, I promised I tried / There's no stone left unturned". It also reminisces about a past relationship with "On the bright side / We had good times / Never faked our pictures / We were perfect". During the song's bridge, she adds "If I had to do it all over again / I would still do it all over again / The love that we made was worth it in the end".

Three days after the song's release, Perry shared her struggle with releasing "Bandaids" for months, describing it as "scary to be vulnerable". She also expressed hope that the lyrics of the song would "resonate" with individuals experiencing similar challenges.

== Critical reception ==
Writing for Stereogum, Danielle Chelosky described "Bandaids" as "actually pretty good". Chelosky suggested that Perry's breakup with Orlando Bloom "gave her emotional turmoil to deal with in music", deeming the song superior to Perry's works with producer Dr. Luke. AnnaMarie Houlis from Parade called the song a "healing-from-heartbreak anthem" and wrote "the song is garnering immediate recognition for its rhythmic resonance as a piece of allegorical art in modern-day music form". Gennaro Costanzo of Clash rated "Bandaids" eight out of 10, describing it as "a long-awaited return to form" which echoes the "pop rock balladry" from her 2008 album One of the Boys. Costanzo suggested that "Bandaids" is the song Perry's 2017 album Witness "was trying to write", stating it is "vulnerable without being preachy, personal without feeling performative". Both The Express Tribune and Variety described the track as a "comeback" for Perry after 143, with the latter highlighting the apparent vulnerability and emotional nature of the song and its accompanying video. Kofi Mframa of USA Today described "Bandaids" as an "enjoyable pop rock ballad with a familiar melody", but still kept their expectations "low" for Perry, hoping to be "pleasantly surprised again". Caitlin Devlin of Ticketmaster UK ranked "Bandaids" 10th among the singer's 11 best songs of all time. Devlin described the track as having an "unapologetically cathartic chorus" and its message as "direct, feeling strong, genuine, and non-performative".

== Accolades ==
Name of award, year listed, category, and result
Award	Year	Category	Result	Ref.
Hollywood Music Video Awards	2026	Best Comedy	Nominated	

== Commercial performance ==
Within the United States, "Bandaids" debuted at number 15 on the Bubbling Under Hot 100, number 34 on the Pop Airplay, and number 23 on the Adult Pop Airplay for the week ending November 22, 2025. The track was the 12th best-selling song during its release week with more than 2,200 digital downloads sold according to Luminate. In its first week of release, "Bandaids" was also the most-added song on both pop radio and hot adult contemporary formats, according to Mediabase's US Radio Updater.

In the United Kingdom, "Bandaids" debuted at number 61 on the UK Singles Chart, moving 6,873 copies during the chart week ending November 20, 2025. In October 2026, following the release of The Vent Sessions 7" vinyl, the song debuted at number one on the Official Vinyl Singles Chart. The song also opened at number 74 on the Canadian Hot 100 and number 99 on the Irish Singles Chart. In Venezuela, "Bandaids" entered at number 20 on Record Report's Top 100 chart while topping the Anglo chart and placing at number eight on the Pop General chart for the week ending November 22, 2025. Elsewhere, "Bandaids" debuted at number five on the Billboard Japan Hot Overseas chart, number six on the New Zealand Hot Singles chart, and at number 29 on the Netherlands' Single Tip chart. In Brazil, the track has been certified Gold by Pro-Música Brasil for shifting 20,000 units within the country.

On the EarOne airplay chart in Italy, "Bandaids" opened at number 33 and was the third highest debuting song for the week ending November 13, 2025. The song ascended and peaked at number 24 the following week. On the Offizielle Deutsche airplay chart in Germany, "Bandaids" made its debut at number 66 for the 46th week chart issue of 2025. In its 12th week on the chart, the song reached the chart's summit.

== Music video ==
=== Production and release ===
On November 5, 2025, Perry posted a music video preview for "Bandaids" on her social media, including its release date and time of 7 PM ET and 4 PM PT the following day. She co-directed the music video with Christian Breslauer, while the production was handled by London Alley and the Lucky Bastards.

=== Synopsis ===
Throughout the music video, Perry is shown going through a series of accidents that show her struggling after a breakup. The video opens with the singer-songwriter washing dishes when her golden ring falls down the sink drain. When trying to retrieve this, she inadvertently hits some dishes that fall onto the garbage disposal's switch and activate it, injuring her ring finger as a result. Perry is then shown sitting on a tree branch and falls to the ground after sawing off the wrong end of it. Her untied shoelace later gets caught in an escalator, and she falls flat on her face. Perry then sits outside the Crumb Café as its windows break, sending glass flying everywhere. She gets electrocuted while walking past a charging station, then gets hit by a log that falls off a logging truck in front of her car while driving. With one foot later getting stuck between railway tracks, Perry nearly gets crushed by a speeding train before spotting a white daisy growing through the rocks. The sight allowed her to break free from the tracks by leaping out of them. She then lands in quicksand, slowly sinking to the bottom, though she manages to climb out. At the end, Perry lights a cigarette at a gas station as "Woman's World" plays in the background, which causes a big explosion.

=== Analysis ===
The concept of the music video is heavily inspired by the American horror franchise Final Destination, such as scenes featuring a logging truck similar to the one that causes the deadly highway pile-up in Final Destination 2 and Perry's shoelace becoming stuck in an escalator, referencing the shopping mall sequence in The Final Destination. The speeding train scene, where she spots a white daisy, is a subtle reference to her daughter, Daisy Dove Bloom. As the music video ends, Perry lights a cigarette while "Woman's World" plays softly in the background, mirroring a scene from the music video for that single. The gas station then explodes, symbolically marking her departure from her negatively received 143 album era. Chelsie Napiza of the International Business Times described the symbolism in the music video as "layered" and the accidents as "emotional upheaval". Kofi Mframa of USA Today defined the series of accidents as "the nature of life and heartbreak", further describing it as "what it's like to follow this stage of her [Perry] career and watch her crash and burn, get up, and crash and burn again".

== Live performances ==
Perry performed "Bandaids" live for the first time as part of The Lifetimes Tour in Lyon, France, on November 7, 2025. On December 31, 2025, she sang the song at the 2025 Bilibili New Year's Eve Gala held in Suzhou, China. On June 18, 2026, Perry performed "Bandaids" during the O Son do Camiño festival in Santiago, Spain. Two days later, she performed the track again during Rock in Rio Lisboa 11.

== Charts ==
=== Weekly charts ===
Weekly chart performance
Chart (2025–2026)	Peak position
Argentina Anglo Airplay (Monitor Latino)	5
Australia (ARIA)	135
Austria Airplay (MusicTrace)	5
Bolivia Anglo Airplay (Monitor Latino)	13
Canada Hot 100 (Billboard)	74
Canada AC (Billboard)	22
Canada CHR/Top 40 (Billboard)	39
Canada Hot AC (Billboard)	23
Central America Anglo Airplay (Monitor Latino)	10
Chile Anglo Airplay (Monitor Latino)	12
CIS Airplay (TopHit)	106
Costa Rica Anglo Airplay (Monitor Latino)	6
Croatia International Airplay (Top lista)	34
Czech Republic Airplay (ČNS IFPI)	24
Ecuador Anglo Airplay (Monitor Latino)	9
Estonia Airplay (TopHit)	49
Finland Airplay (Radiosoittolista)	60
Germany Airplay (BVMI)	1
Guatemala Anglo Airplay (Monitor Latino)	4
Ireland (IRMA)	99
Israel International TV Airplay (Media Forest)	1
Italy Airplay (EarOne)	24
Japan Hot Overseas (Billboard Japan)	5
Kazakhstan Airplay (TopHit)	36
Latin America Anglo Airplay (Monitor Latino)	16
Latvia Airplay (LaIPA)	9
Lithuania Airplay (TopHit)	13
Malta Airplay (Radiomonitor)	14
Mexico Anglo Airplay (Monitor Latino)	17
Netherlands (Single Tip)	29
New Zealand Hot Singles (RMNZ)	6
New Zealand Airplay (Recorded Music NZ)	27
Nicaragua Anglo Airplay (Monitor Latino)	1
Panama Anglo Airplay (Monitor Latino)	9
Paraguay Anglo Airplay (Monitor Latino)	13
Peru Anglo Airplay (Monitor Latino)	17
Poland (Polish Airplay Top 100)	83
Puerto Rico Anglo Airplay (Monitor Latino)	8
Slovakia Airplay (ČNS IFPI)	13
Slovenia Airplay (Radiomonitor)	13
South Korea BGM (Circle)	175
Switzerland Airplay (IFPI)	4
UK Singles (Official Charts)	61
UK Vinyl Singles (OCC)	1
US Bubbling Under Hot 100 (Billboard)	15
US Adult Contemporary (Billboard)	24
US Adult Pop Airplay (Billboard)	11
US Digital Song Sales (Billboard)	12
US Pop Airplay (Billboard)	28
Venezuela (Record Report)	20

=== Monthly charts ===
Monthly chart performance
Chart (2025)	Peak position
Estonia Airplay (TopHit)	64
Kazakhstan Airplay (TopHit)	84
Lithuania Airplay (TopHit)	14

=== Year-end charts ===
Year-end chart performance
Chart (2025)	Position
Italy International Airplay (EarOne)	60

== Certifications ==
Certifications for "Bandaids"
Region	Certification	Certified units/sales
Brazil (Pro-Música Brasil)	Gold	20,000^{‡}
^{‡} Sales+streaming figures based on certification alone.

== Release history ==
Release dates and formats
Region	Date	Format(s)	Label	Ref.
Various	November 6, 2025	Digital download; streaming	Capitol	
Italy	November 7, 2025	Radio airplay	Universal	
United States	November 12, 2025	Contemporary hit radio	Capitol	
Various	October 2, 2026	7-inch vinyl	Capitol	
