= Hae =

Hae or HAE may refer to:

== People ==
- Hae Phoofolo, interim Prime Minister of Lesotho
- Hae clan, Korean clan

== Other uses ==
- Hae (letter), a Georgian letter
- Height above ellipsoid, a measure of elevation or altitude
- Hereditary angioedema, a rare disease
- Hepatic artery embolization, a method to treat liver tumors
- Hire Association Europe, a trade association
- Human Arts Ensemble, a 1970s musical collective from St. Louis, Missouri
- Eastern Oromo language (ISO 639 code: hae), an Ethiopian language
- Haemonetics (NYSE stock ticker HAE), a blood and plasma company
- Hannibal Regional Airport (FAA LID: HAE), an airport in Missouri, United States
- Hanover-Altenbeken Railway Company (German: Hannover-Altenbekener Eisenbahn-Gesellschaft), a nineteenth-century German railway company
- Hemorrhoidal artery embolization, a non-surgical for treatment of internal hemorrhoids

== See also ==
- Hay (disambiguation)
- Hey (disambiguation)
