= Hey Hey Hey (disambiguation) =

"Hey Hey Hey" is a Katy Perry song. It may also refer to:

== Music ==
- "Hey Hey Hey (Pop Another Bottle)", a song by Belgian DJ Laurent Wéry, featuring vocals from Dev & Swift K.I.D.
- "Hey, Hey, Hey", a song from the soundtrack for the film Clambake by Elvis Presley
- "Hey, Hey, Hey", a song from The Sound of Sunshine by Michael Franti and Spearhead
- "Hey! Hey! Hey!", a song from Something to Crow About by The Riverboat Gamblers
- "Hey Hey Hey", a 2009 song from Happy Hour by Uncle Kracker
- Hey! Hey! Hey! Music Champ, a Japanese music variety show on Fuji TV

== Other uses ==
- "Hey hey hey!", a catchphrase said by the character Fat Albert in the animated TV series Fat Albert and the Cosby Kids

== See also ==
- Hey (disambiguation)
- Hey Hey (disambiguation)
- "Hey-Hey-Hey-Hey!", a song written and first recorded by Little Richard
