= Hiei =

Hiei or Hiyei may refer to:

- Mount Hiei, northeast of Kyoto, Japan
- Japanese ship Hiei, several warships of the Japanese Navy
- Hiei (YuYu Hakusho), a fictional character in the anime and manga series YuYu Hakusho

== See also ==
- Hei (disambiguation)
