= Save as Draft =

Single by Katy Perry

from the album Witness
- Released: June 26, 2017
- Studio: Encore Studios (Burbank); MXM Studios (Stockholm)
- Length: 3:48
- Label: Capitol
- Songwriters: Katy Perry; Jonnali Parmenius; Dijon McFarlane; Nicholas Audino; Lewis Hughes; Elof Loelv
- Producer: Elof Loelv

Katy Perry singles chronology
| "Feels" (2017) | "Save as Draft" (2017) | "Hey Hey Hey" (2018) |

Audio video
- "Save as Draft" on YouTube

"Save as Draft" is a song recorded by the American singer-songwriter Katy Perry for her fifth studio album, Witness (2017). It was sent to adult contemporary radio in the United States on June 26, 2017, by Capitol Records, as the record's fourth single. The track was written by Perry, Noonie Bao, Dijon McFarlane, Nicholas Audino, Lewis Hughes and its producer Elof Loelv. Musically, "Save as Draft" is a mid-tempo power ballad, which lyrically portrays a warning about coming to terms with an ex.

Reviewers were ambivalent about "Save as Draft" following its release. While receiving praise for its sensibility and innovation on the subject matter, it was also called mediocre and inferior to other tracks on Witness. The song also drew comparisons to the music of Sam Smith, Lorde, and Timbaland. Commercially, "Save as Draft" reached numbers 14 and 19 on Billboard's Adult Contemporary and Adult Top 40 component charts, respectively, in the United States. It was aided by several live performances, including during her concert tour Witness: The Tour (2017–2018) and four-day YouTube live stream Katy Perry Live: Witness World Wide (2017).

== Recording and release ==
"Save as Draft" was written by Katy Perry, Noonie Bao, Dijon McFarlane, Nicholas Audino, Lewis Hughes and Elof Loelv, while production was solely handled by the latter; Max Martin was credited as a vocal producer. The song is included on Witness (2017), Perry's fifth studio album. It was sent to American adult contemporary radio stations on June 26, 2017, by Capitol Records, as Witness's fourth single. It was ranked as the format's most added song that week alongside American recording artist Kesha's "Praying" (2017), with each impacting 16 radio stations.

== Composition and lyrics ==
Musically, "Save as Draft" is a mid-tempo power ballad, featuring "icy" production, and technology metaphors. During an episode of Delilah Rene's podcast Conversations with Delilah, Perry said that the song was a warning about coming to terms with an ex: "I've been in that cycle before in a relationship and it had kind of reignited the relationship, and there's only so many times you can reignite the relationship or want to or should and sometimes you just need to write it and never send it [...] It's just that exercise, that cathartic exercise." Perry further stated: "I like drafting and then sleeping on it because, for me, my emotions get very heightened in the evening [...]." Based on the interview, HuffPost's Brittany Wong called the singer a "breakup coach" and jokingly advised her to write a self-help book in the future.

In a review of "Save as Draft", Bobby Finger of Jezebel speculated that the song was about blogging, with Perry "describ[ing] the pain of desperately wanting to provide satisfying content for an impassioned, unpredictable audience that is incapable of ever being satisfied" and "explain[ing] the frustrating act of writing a blog you never publish out of fear that it will only be torn apart by haters or misunderstood". According to Finger, the singer ultimately "decides to hide her truth from the public". Kevin O'Donnell of Entertainment Weekly wrote that "Save as Draft" showcases "a timely rumination on the suckiness of living in a digital world". Lyrics of the track include: "I don't fuck with change, but lately I've been flipping coins a lot" and "I struggle, I juggle, I could just throw a line to you / But I should let sleeping dogs lie / 'Cause I know better, baby / I write it, erase it, repeat it, but what good will it do to reopen the wound?" Perry sings the lines: "So I take a deep breath / And I save as draft" in a near whisper tone and takes an audible breath throughout.

== Reception and promotion ==
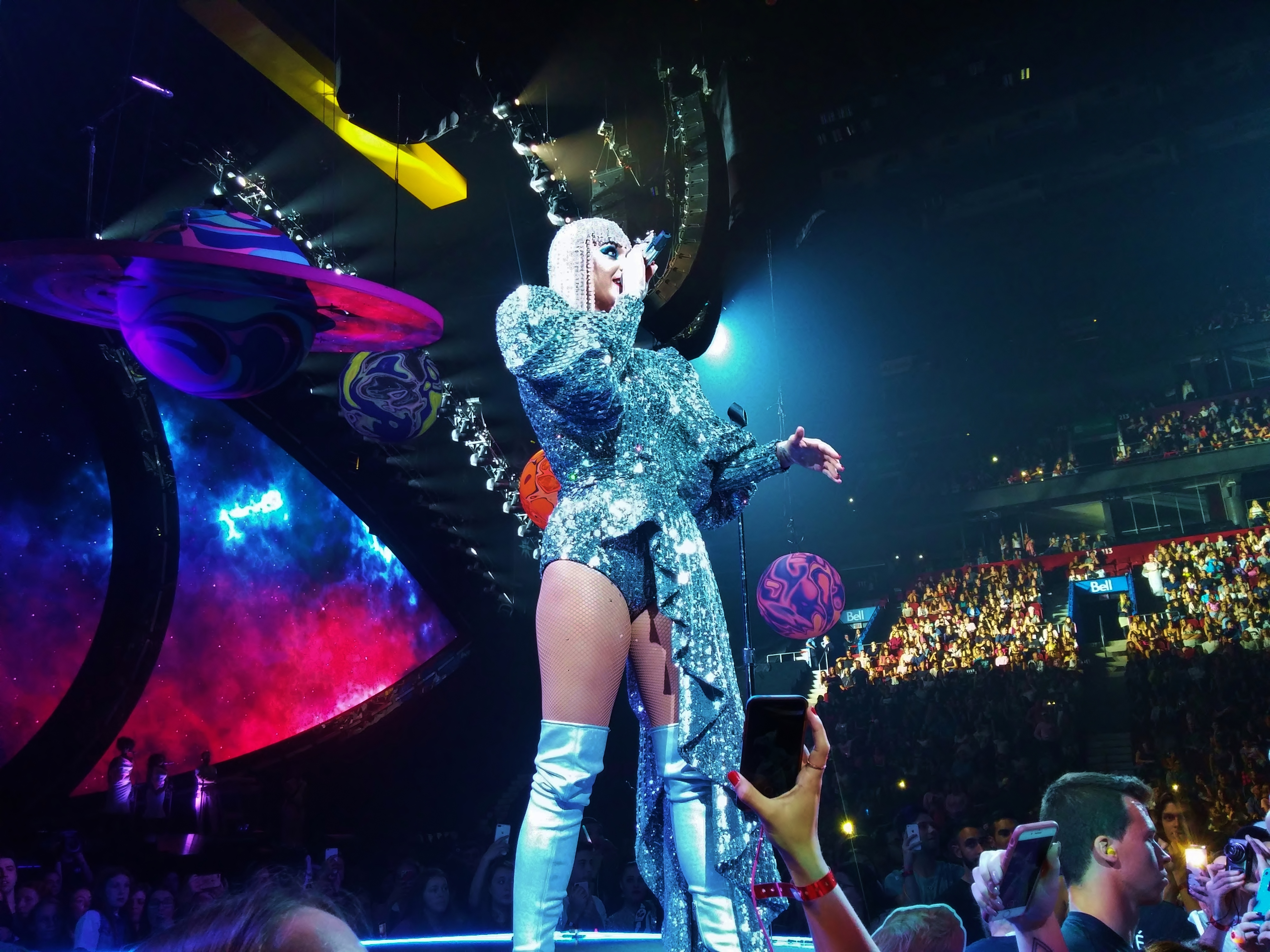
Perry performing "Save as Draft" at Bell Centre in Montreal, Canada during her Witness: The Tour (2017–2018)

Upon its release, "Save as Draft" was met with mixed reviews from music critics. Finger from Jezebel called the song's chorus "moving" and concluded: "Wow, I'm sobbing". Wren Graves, writing for Consequence of Sound, thought that "Save as Draft" was the best among the closing tracks on Witness and wrote: "[it] puts a 21st century spin on the old thinking-of-my-ex weeper." Idolator's Mike Wass was mixed towards the song, calling it inferior to other mid-tempo tracks on the album, although labelling its subject matter "relatable and the track should satisfy fans/radio programmers looking for a little more substance". Chris Willman from Variety similarly thought that "Save as Draft" was a "mixed bag". Rolling Stone's Christopher R. Weingarten negatively compared the track to the work of Sam Smith, while others likened it to Timbaland and OneRepublic's "Apologize" (2007), as well as to the material of Lorde. Commercially, "Save as Draft" reached number 14 on Billboard's Adult Contemporary component chart on August 5, 2017, staying on the chart for 16 weeks. On the Adult Top 40 chart, it peaked at number 19 on August 26, 2017, leaving after 10 weeks.

Perry promoted "Save as Draft" with several live performances. The singer included the song during her Witness: The Tour (2017–2018) concert tour at selected dates, where she performed it towards the end with fellow ballads from her catalog. Perry also sang the track during her four-day YouTube live stream Katy Perry Live: Witness World Wide (2017), at the Glastonbury Festival near Pilton, Somerset, England on June 24, and for British radio station Kiss on June 30, 2017; at the latter appearance, she performed an acoustic version of the song.

== Credits and personnel ==
Credits adapted from the liner notes of Witness.

=== Recording locations ===
- Recorded at Encore Studios (Burbank, California) and MXM Studios (Stockholm, Sweden)
- Mixed at MixStar Studios (Virginia Beach, Virginia)

=== Personnel ===
- Katy Perry – vocals, composition
- Nicholas Audino – composition
- Noonie Bao – composition
- Rachael Findlen - engineer
- Serban Ghenea - mixing
- John Hanes - mixing engineer
- Lewis Hughes – composition
- Peter Karlsson - vocal editing
- Elof Loelv – composition, production, engineer, drums, bass, piano, synthesizer
- Randy Marill - mastering
- Max Martin – vocal production
- Dijon McFarlane – composition

== Charts ==
=== Weekly charts ===
Weekly chart performance for "Save as Draft"
| Chart (2017) | Peak position |
|---|---|
| US Adult Contemporary (Billboard) | 14 |
| US Adult Pop Airplay (Billboard) | 19 |

=== Year-end charts ===
Year-end chart performance for "Save as Draft"
| Chart (2017) | Position |
|---|---|
| US Adult Contemporary (Billboard) | 45 |
