= Hey =

Hey, HEY, or Hey! may refer to:

== Music ==
- Hey (band), a Polish rock band

=== Albums ===
- Hey (Andreas Bourani album) or the title song (see below), 2014
- Hey! (Julio Iglesias album) or the title song, 1980
- Hey! (Jullie album) or the title song, 2009
- Hey! Album, by Marvelous 3, 1998
- Hey, by the Glitter Band, 1974
- Hey!, by the Gruesomes, 1988
- Hey, by Toni Price, 1995
- Hey: A Pixies Tribute, a Pixies tribute album, 2003

=== EPs ===
- Hey (EP) or the title song, by Le1f, 2014
- Hey!, by Dzeko & Torres, 2012
- Hey!, by the Regrettes, 2015

=== Songs ===
- "Hey" (Andreas Bourani song), 2015
- "Hey" (Fais song), 2016
- "Hey" (Flow song), 2011
- "Hey" (Lil Jon song), 2010
- "Hey" (Mitchel Musso song), 2009
- "Hey!" (Masaharu Fukuyama song), 2000
- "Hey", by Alvvays from Antisocialites, 2017
- "Hey", by Backstreet Boys, 2025
- "Hey", by Bic Runga from Drive, 1997
- "Hey", by Crystal Bernard, 1999
- "Hey", by Gillmor, opening theme for the U.S. sitcom Unhitched, 2008
- "Hey!", by the Go! Team from Semicircle, 2018
- "Hey", by the Goo Goo Dolls from Hold Me Up, 1990
- "Hey", by Hanson from Underneath, 2004
- "Hey!", by the Hellacopters from Payin' the Dues, 1997
- "Hey", by Leeland from Sound of Melodies, 2006
- "Hey", by Low from Hey What, 2021
- "Hey!", by MF Doom from Operation: Doomsday, 1999
- "Hey", by Movielife from Forty Hour Train Back to Penn, 2003
- "Hey!", by Oingo Boingo from Boingo, 1994
- "Hey", by the Pixies from Doolittle, 1989
- "Hey", by the Red Hot Chili Peppers from Stadium Arcadium, 2006
- "Hey!", by Showtek and Bassjackers, 2012
- "Hey", by the Suicide Machines from Destruction by Definition, 1996
- "Hey (I've Been Feeling Kind of Lonely)", by Danny Saucedo from Heart Beats, 2007
- "Hey! (Rise of the Robots)", by The Stranglers from Black and White, 1978
- "Hey! (So What)", by Dannii Minogue from Neon Nights, 2003
- "Rock and Roll" (Gary Glitter song), commonly known as "The Hey song", 1972

== Other uses ==
- Hey (surname)
- Hey (company), a Faroese telecommunications company
- Hey (email service), an email service by Basecamp
- Hey (magazine), a defunct Turkish music magazine
- Hey, Iran, a village in Zanjan Province
- Hey, a common spoken greeting
- Hanchey Army Heliport (IATA code)
- Heyington railway station, Melbourne
- Informal synonym for Hello

== See also ==
- Hey Hey (disambiguation)
- Hay (disambiguation)
- Heya (disambiguation)
- Hei (disambiguation)
- Hej, a village in Sweden
- Hej!, a 2018 album by Felicita
- "Heyy", a 2022 song by Lil Baby
