= Hey Hey =

Hey Hey may refer to:

- Hey Hey, Iran, a village in Shirin Darreh Rural District, Iran
- "Hey, Hey", a song by Dispatch from Silent Steeples
- "Hey Hey", a song by Athena Cage from The Art Of A Woman
- "Hey Hey", a song by the Planet Smashers from No Self Control
- "Hey Hey", a song by Swami from Equalize

== See also ==
- Hey Hey It's Saturday, an Australian television series
- Hey (disambiguation)
- Hey Hey Hey (disambiguation)
- "Hey-Hey-Hey-Hey!", a song written and first recorded by Little Richard
- "Hey Hey OK!", a song by Anson Lo
