= Hey Hey Hey =

2018 single by Katy Perry

Single by Katy Perry

from the album Witness
- Released: January 12, 2018
- Studio: MXM, Los Angeles; MXM, Stockholm; Wolf Cousins, Stockholm
- Genre: Electropop
- Length: 3:34
- Label: Capitol; Universal
- Songwriters: Katy Perry; Max Martin; Sia Furler; Ali Payami; Sarah Hudson
- Producers: Martin; Payami

Katy Perry singles chronology
"Save as Draft" (2017)	"Hey Hey Hey" (2018)	"Cozy Little Christmas" (2018)

Music video
- "Hey Hey Hey" on YouTube

"Hey Hey Hey" is a song recorded by the American singer-songwriter Katy Perry for her fifth studio album Witness (2017). It was sent to Italian contemporary hit radio stations on January 12, 2018 by Universal Music Group as the album's fifth single. The song was written by Perry, Max Martin, Sia, Ali Payami, and Sarah Hudson, while production was handled by Martin and Payami. "Hey Hey Hey" is a rock- and electronica-influenced, dark electropop track about female empowerment. Reviewers speculated that the song was also about the 2016 United States presidential election nominees Donald Trump and Hillary Clinton.

Music critics gave mixed reviews of "Hey Hey Hey", with some praising it as one of the highlights of Witness and others deeming it mediocre. It was also compared to the works of American singer Britney Spears and New Zealand singer-songwriter Lorde. To accompany the track, a music video was uploaded onto Perry's official YouTube account on December 20, 2017. The clip was filmed by Isaac Rentz in Beverly Hills, California and is set in the 18th century and the Ancien Régime, with the singer's outfits resembling those of the last Queen of France before the French Revolution Marie Antoinette and French heroine Joan of Arc. For further promotion, Perry gave several live performances of "Hey Hey Hey", including those during her concert tour Witness: The Tour (2017–2018) and her four-day YouTube live stream Katy Perry Live: Witness World Wide (2017). Commercially, the song appeared on charts in Czech Republic, the Netherlands, New Zealand and Sweden.

== Recording and composition ==
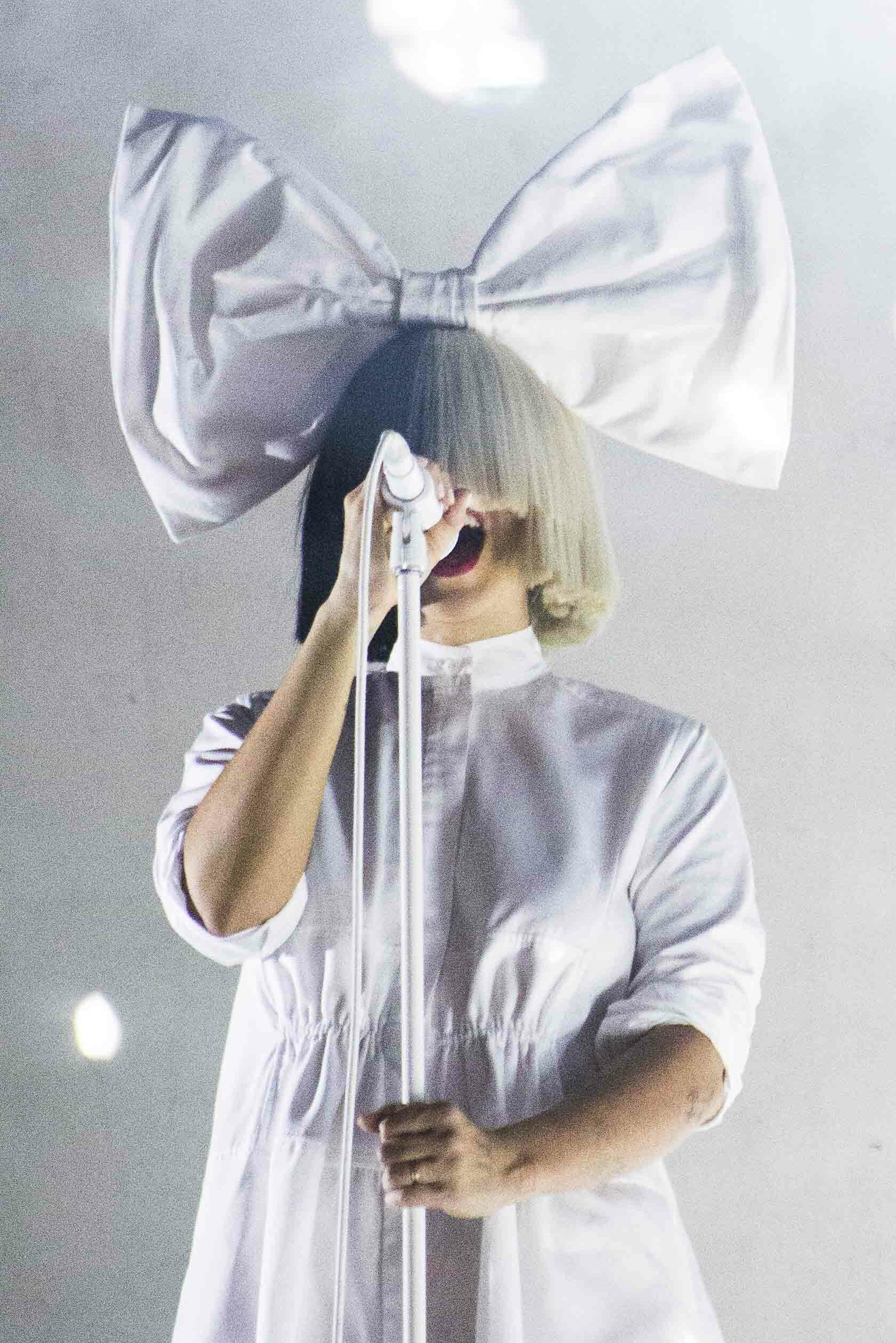
Australian singer-songwriter Sia (pictured in 2016) contributed to the writing of the song.

"Hey Hey Hey" was recorded at MXM Studios in Los Angeles, California, and at Wolf Cousins Studios in Stockholm, Sweden. It was mixed at MixStar Studios in Virginia Beach, Virginia, by Serban Ghenea and John Hanes, and mastered at Sterling Sound in New York City by Randy Merrill. It was written by Katy Perry, Sia, Sarah Hudson, Max Martin and Ali Payami, and was produced by Martin and Payami. Martin performed percussion on the track and Payami provided percussion, bass, synths and piano. Cory Bice and Jeremy Lertola both served as engineer assistants and Peter Karlsson was credited as vocal producer. Perry sang lead and background vocals for "Hey Hey Hey", with Astrid S providing additional background vocals. The song is the second track on Witness (2017), Perry's fifth studio album.

Musically, "Hey Hey Hey" is a rock and electronica-influenced and "2000s" electropop song. It lyrically "asserts that women can be complex people with a multitude of personality traits" and deals with themes of female empowerment. Annie Zaleski of The A.V. Club wrote that "the song depicts a narrow version of femininity and success—lipstick and a dress, and being rich, respectively—and it perpetuates irksome stereotypes about strong women". Lyrics from "Hey Hey Hey" include: "A hot little hurricane/'Cause I'm feminine and soft, but I'm still a boss, yeah/Red lipstick but still so raw, yeah/ [...] I smell like a rose and I pierce like a thorn", and "I ain't got no strings/I'm no one's little puppet". Throughout the recording, Perry denies "she's a fragile little Fabergé", and refers to herself as "a seasoned PR pro". NME writer Leonie Cooper described the line, "Marilyn Monroe in a monster truck" as "retro-meets-trashy" and Lana Del Rey-influenced.

== Critical reception ==
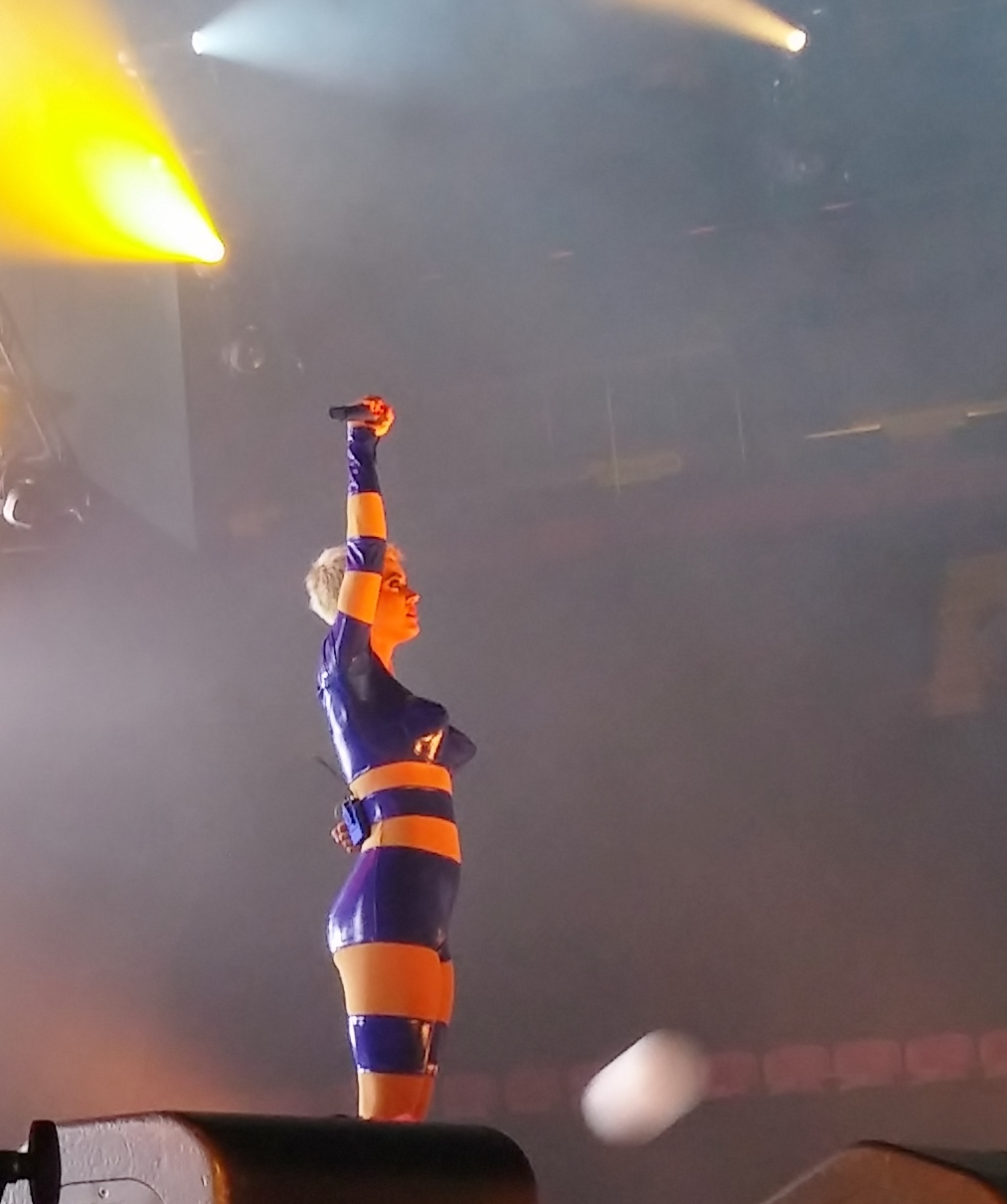
Perry performing the song during Witness: The Tour

Upon its release, music critics gave "Hey Hey Hey" mixed reviews. Sal Cinquemani of Slant Magazine praised Perry for being "at her most effective and comfortable". Idolator writer Mike Wass positively likened the track to material from American singer Britney Spears' seventh studio album Femme Fatale (2011), and called it a highlight of Witness. Although labelling the production of "Hey Hey Hey" formulaic, Andy Gill of The Independent also highlighted the song as one of the best on the album. Cooper of NME compared the recording's "languid, spacious sound" to the works of New Zealand singer Lorde.

Other reviewers speculated that "Hey Hey Hey" dealt with the 2016 United States presidential election nominees Donald Trump and Hillary Clinton, with Perry taking side with the latter. Zaleski of The A.V. Club was negative towards the track, calling it "galling" and "particularly oblivious". She noted the line, "'Cause I'm feminine and soft, but I'm still a boss, yeah", was not in concordance with the "not [...] warm or relatable" Clinton, whom Perry supported on multiple occasions. The Los Angeles Times's Mikael Wood negatively wrote: " 'Hey Hey Hey' plays like a weak attempt to duplicate the success of her uplifting 2013 smash 'Roar', this time with a paper-thin tune and clunky words". Fabian Gorsler from Highsnobiety described the single as "underwhelming".

== Music video ==
=== Production and release ===
Before the release of an accompanying music video for "Hey Hey Hey", Perry began teasing it with a series of Marie Antoinette-themed pictures of herself. The clip was subsequently uploaded onto the singer's official YouTube channel on December 20, 2017, with a behind-the-scenes video premiering on January 4, 2018 on the same platform. When posting the clip on her Instagram account, Perry added the caption:

After a year of peaks and valleys (remember, it's all a journey), I wanted to end 2017 with a fun, triumphant piece of pop candy. Just think of it as a glam little stocking stuffer from me to you. 'Hey Hey Hey' is one of my favorite songs from "Witness" and for me, it embodies the fighting spirit I always want you to be able to find within yourself, and to see in me.

The song's video was filmed in Beverly Hills, California by Isaac Rentz, and was produced by Nina Dluhy-Miller and Danny Lockwood. Six backup dancers were hired; Megan Lawson was credited as their choreographer. During the accompanying behind-the-scenes video, Perry resumed the clip's message: "You don't have to be just one thing if you're a woman, you can be all things. And just 'cause you're vulnerable does not make you weak". Reviewers said the music video depicts events occurring in the 18th century and Ancien Régime, while also incorporating modern elements. During the clip, Perry wears a sculptural blonde wig with curls, and her looks resemble those of French heroine Joan of Arc and Antoinette. Joey Nolfi of Entertainment Weekly found similarities between the singer's wardrobe and that of Sofia Coppola's 2006 film Marie Antoinette.

=== Synopsis ===
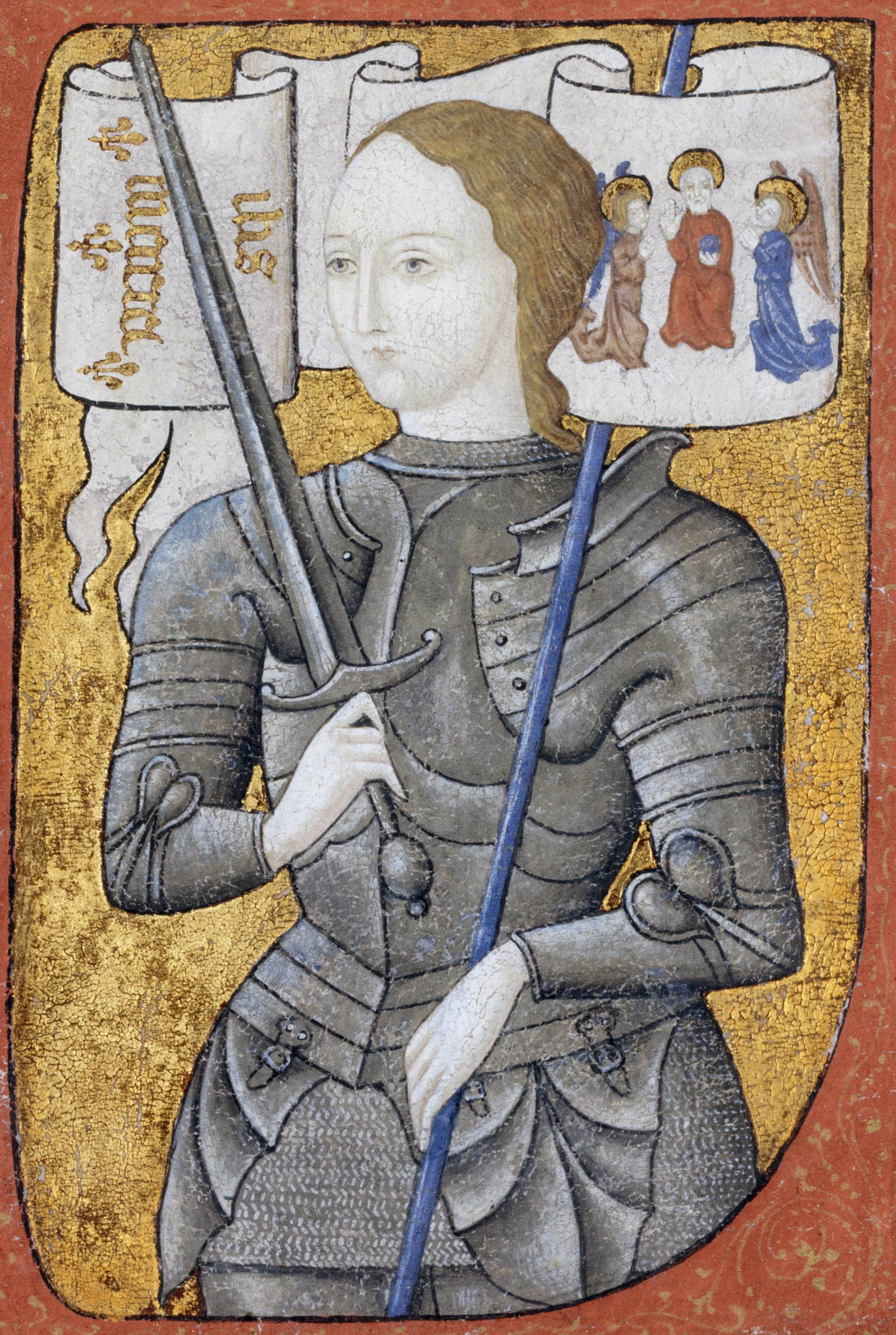
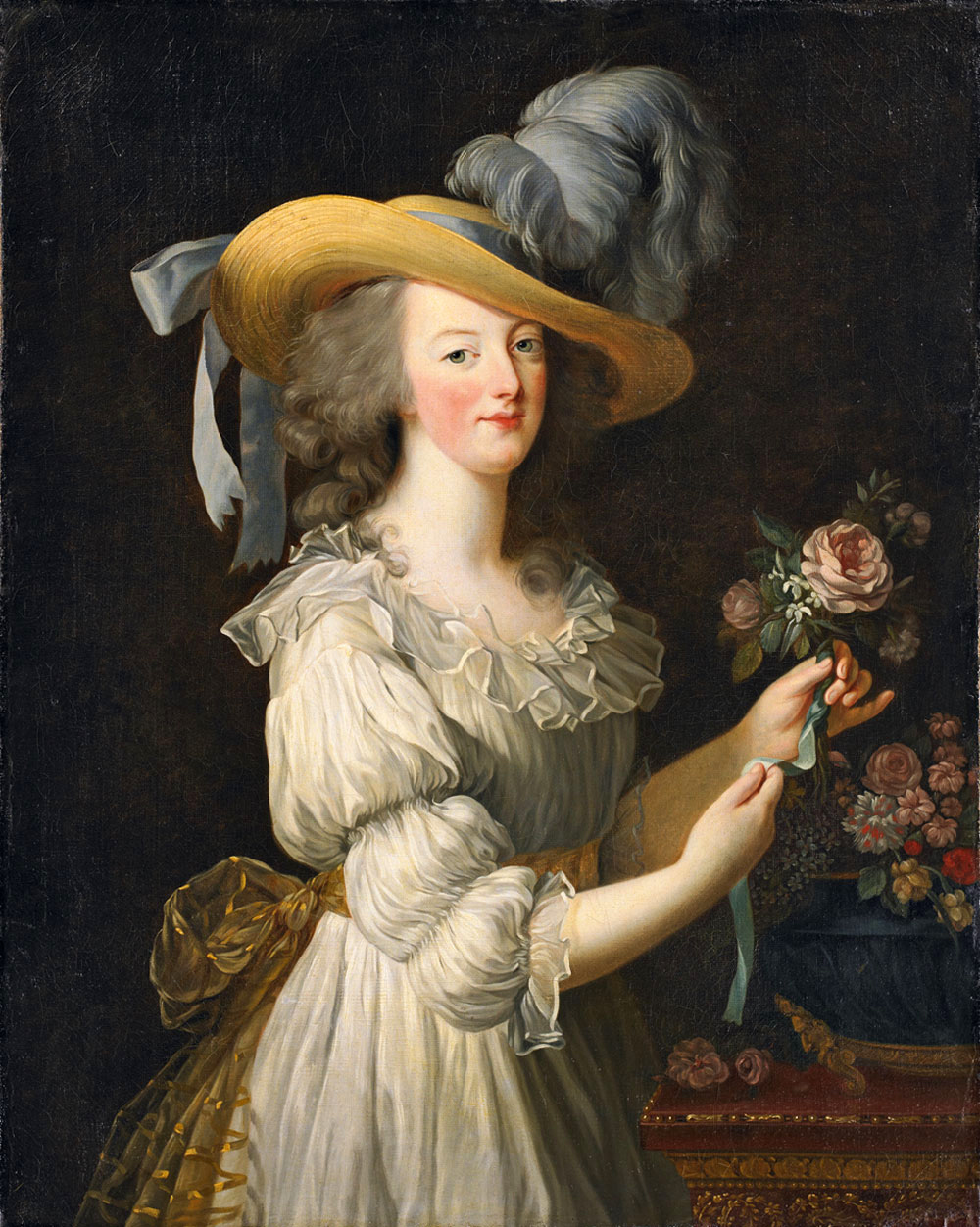
Perry's costumes in the music video resemble those of French heroine Joan of Arc (left; miniature from the 15th century) and the last Queen of France before the French Revolution Marie Antoinette (right; painted by Louise Élisabeth Vigée Le Brun in 1783).

The music video opens with a shot of a palace and one of its French-inspired hallways. Lying in her bed, Perry is awakened by the sound of a horn blown by three women, and is given a brown drink ("Napoleon's Coffee") and her smartphone, where she communicates in-video with Prince Piggy (played by Tad Brown) regarding their date. The three women are seen cleaning Perry's underwear, lacing her corset and walking with books on their heads, among other activities. Perry, seemingly overwhelmed, falls down and sees a book titled "JOAN!", with its cover displaying a female warrior. The video subsequently transitions to a scene depicting Perry holding a sword and wearing a dress with an eye placed on her breast. She dances with three female background dancers and eats cake with them.

Following this, a scene shows Perry's and Prince Piggy's date; the latter makes advances towards Perry and arranges his vegetables on his plate to spell DTF. Disgusted, Perry seeks the advice of her friend Lord Markus on her phone, who tells her to "get out of there!". Perry then fights with Prince Piggy in a video game theme, defeating him. Returning to the video's main plot, Perry and the prince dance together and watch a puppet show. Prince Piggy tries to kiss the singer; she slaps him and gets decapitated, but her head is picked up by the version of Perry seen earlier. The clip ends with Perry running with her sword towards the prince and his servants.

=== Reception ===
Critics gave mixed reviews of the music video upon its premiere. Nina Braca from Billboard called it "triumphant", while The Malay Mail said it was "humorous", and Nolfi from Entertainment Weekly described it as "candy-colored". Direct Lyrics' Kevin Apaza wrote: "We totally dug this video. We liked the high budget, all the perfect details, the deep message conveyed, and of course Katy's humor too". Ross McNeilage from MTV UK similarly praised the video, pointing out its "high-concept" and stating: "The [...] singer's visual treatment brings the lyrics to life, highlighting its themes of resilience with a fitting storyline. Despite the serious undertones of defiance, the video is jam-packed with Katy's goofy humour throughout and doesn't take itself too seriously at all." Evan Jorssen of NRJ likened the three women seen in the clip accompanying Perry to characters from the 1993 American comedy horror fantasy film Hocus Pocus and the 1899 French film Cinderella. Julien Goncalves of Pure Charts compared parts of the video's concept to Madonna's live performance of "Vogue" (1990) at the 1990 MTV Video Music Awards. In a negative review, Highsnobiety's Gorsler wrote: "The visuals are, to put it kindly, less than stellar, with over-the-top production and a lavishly nonsensical plot making the music video one of the weirdest things to come out this year. But all that is to be expected from an artist like Katy Perry, who is famous for her eccentricity." He also criticized the heavy product placement and the use of an air horn rap trumpet sound at the beginning of the video, which "sound[s] like Katy Perry spent a little too much time playing around with Virtual DJ". Vice magazine also slightly criticized the product placement sequences.

== Live performances ==
Perry promoted "Hey Hey Hey" with several live performances and included the song in the closing segment of her Witness: The Tour (2017–2018) concert tour, where she performed it on a Tron-style motorcycle. Perry also sang the track during her four-day YouTube live stream Katy Perry Live: Witness World Wide (2017); at the Glastonbury Festival near Pilton, Somerset, England, on June 24, and for British radio station Kiss on June 26, 2017, where she performed an acoustic version of the song.

== Credits and personnel ==
Credits and personnel adapted from the liner notes of Witness.

=== Recording ===
- Recorded at MXM Studios (Los Angeles, California), MXM Studios (Stockholm, Sweden) and Wolf Cousins Studios (Stockholm, Sweden)
- Mixed at MixStar Studios (Virginia Beach, Virginia)
- Mastered at Sterling Sound (New York City, New York)

=== Personnel ===
- Katy Perry – songwriting, lead vocals, background vocals
- Max Martin – songwriting, production for MXM Productions, programming, percussion, Max's tooth
- Sia – songwriting
- Ali Payami – songwriting, production for Wolf Cousins Productions, programming, percussion, bass, synths, piano
- Sarah Hudson – songwriting
- Astrid S – background vocals
- Sam Holland – engineering
- Cory Bice – engineering assistant
- Jeremy Lertola – engineering assistant
- Peter Karlsson – vocal editing
- Serban Ghenea – mixing
- John Hanes – mixing engineering
- Randy Merrill – mastering

== Charts ==
Weekly chart performance for "Hey Hey Hey"
Chart (2017–18)	Peak position
Czech Republic Airplay (ČNS IFPI)	53
Italy International Airplay (EarOne)	40
Netherlands (Dutch Tipparade 40)	13
Netherlands (Single Tip)	26
New Zealand Heatseekers (RMNZ)	5
Sweden (Sverigetopplistan)	95

== Certifications ==
Certifications for "Hey Hey Hey"
Region	Certification	Certified units/sales
Brazil (Pro-Música Brasil)	Gold	20,000^{‡}
^{‡} Sales+streaming figures based on certification alone.

== Release history ==
Release dates and formats for "Hey Hey Hey"
Region	Date	Format	Label	Ref.
Italy	January 12, 2018	Radio airplay	Universal	
