= Swish Swish =

2017 single by Katy Perry featuring Nicki Minaj

Single by Katy Perry featuring Nicki Minaj

from the album Witness
- Released: May 19, 2017
- Studio: Unsub (Los Angeles, California); Blasé Boys Club (Hertfordshire, England); Jungle City (New York City, New York); Glenwood Place (Burbank, California)
- Genre: EDM; hip-hop
- Length: 4:02
- Label: Capitol
- Songwriters: Katy Perry; Duke Dumont; Sarah Hudson; PJ "Promnite" Sledge; Onika Maraj; Brittany Hazzard
- Producer: Duke Dumont

Katy Perry singles chronology
"Bon Appétit" (2017)	"Swish Swish" (2017)	"Feels" (2017)

Nicki Minaj singles chronology
"Kissing Strangers" (2017)	"Swish Swish" (2017)	"Rake It Up" (2017)

Music video
- "Swish Swish" on YouTube

"Swish Swish" is a song by the American singer-songwriter Katy Perry featuring Trinidadian rapper Nicki Minaj from the former's fifth studio album, Witness (2017). It was initially released as a promotional single on May 19, 2017, and later as the album's third single. The house-inspired EDM and hip-hop song was written alongside Sarah Hudson, Starrah, producer Duke Dumont, and additional producer PJ "Promnite" Sledge, with Roland Clark receiving writing credits for the sampling of his song "I Get Deep", and Noah "Mailbox" Passovoy receiving additional and vocal production credits.

"Swish Swish" uses basketball metaphors to address Perry's bullies and detractors. Multiple media outlets suspected that the song is about singer-songwriter Taylor Swift's 2015 single "Bad Blood", which was believed to be about Perry. Upon its release, music critics wrote mixed reviews of the track; some praised the track's empowering theme and Minaj's verse, while others criticized the song's lyrics. "Swish Swish" reached the top 10 in the Philippines and Lebanon, in addition to the top 20 in Canada and the United Kingdom as well as the top 30 in Australia and Ireland. It has also been certified diamond in Brazil as well as platinum in Australia, Canada, Finland, New Zealand, Poland, the United Kingdom, and the United States, and was featured in the video game Just Dance 2018.

Promotion for the track began with a live debut of the track on Saturday Night Live, with a performance that went viral. Subsequently, Perry continued to promote the track during BBC Radio 1's Big Weekend, the Glastonbury Festival 2017 and The Voice Australia. Later, to further promote the track, a lyric video for the track, featuring Brazilian singer Gretchen, was released on July 3, 2017. The official music video, directed by Dave Meyers, premiered on August 24, 2017. Three days later, Perry and Minaj performed the track together for the first time during the 2017 MTV Video Music Awards.

== Production and release ==
After Duke Dumont produced a track Perry recorded for H&M's 2015 holiday campaign called "Every Day Is a Holiday", he expressed interest in working with the singer again, adding: "I think we could switch things up a little more for the next record. Who knows what we could do?" Eventually, they paired together to work on the record, with Dumont claiming that Perry was a fan of his music and that they kept in touch, noting that "her vision for the album wasn't a million miles away from the stuff I'm making." He added: "[...] working on this project it was great seeing what her vision was for the album and being able to help with that. I am genuinely excited for the music." Dumont also said that "it was a very easy process and we made the song quickly. And then about two weeks ago I heard that [Nicki Minaj] is going to feature on it, it was very quick."

Minaj's appearance on the track was only discovered when the song was released. Minaj and Perry previously worked together on Minaj's song "Get on Your Knees", with Perry writing it with the rapper. However, she did not have time to record her vocals, and Ariana Grande ended up singing the song. As Perry recalled, "We've always wanted to collaborate, we've done so many things together... we did a VH1 show. [...] I actually sent her a couple of songs before these songs were out and she loved 'Swish Swish' the most and she just did it so much justice. Honestly, I just want her to do the whole song." Perry also talked about Minaj's rap skills, commenting: "With Nicki, she's such a [boss-ass bitch] that you can send her anything and her pen game is crazy." On May 18, 2017, Perry announced on Instagram the track would be released at midnight Eastern time. "Swish Swish" was released the next day as the third single from her fifth album Witness, and was included along with the pre-order of the album upon its debut. Its single cover features Perry's "blinged-out hand holding receipts from a place called 'Karma Coffee & Tea'." On May 26, 2017, Capitol Records confirmed it would focus on promoting "Swish Swish" to pop radio.

== Composition and lyrics ==
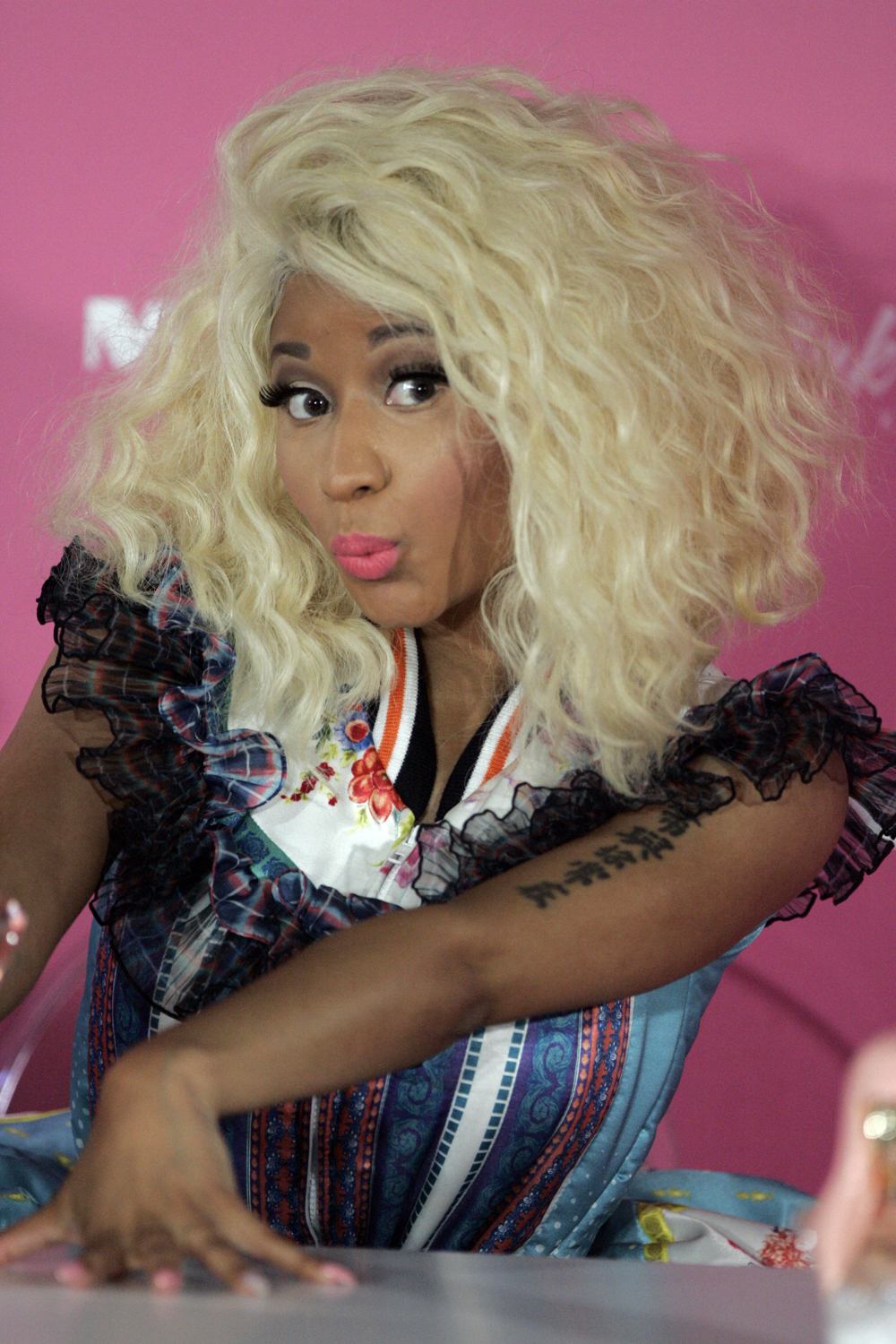
Nicki Minaj contributed a rap verse to "Swish Swish".

"Swish Swish" was written by Perry with Duke Dumont, Sarah Hudson, PJ "Promnite" Sledge, Minaj, and Brittany Hazzard, while its production was done by Dumont with additional production by Sledge and Noah "Mailbox" Passovoy. The song samples "I Get Deep" by Roland Clark. "Swish Swish" was noted to have a beat similar to Maya Jane Coles' "What They Say" (2010). The song is performed in the key of F minor with a tempo of 120 beats per minute in common time. It follows a chord progression of Cm7–A♭maj7–Gm7–Cm7–A♭maj7–Fm7, and Perry's vocals span from E♭_{3} to A♭_{4}. The track is four minutes and two seconds long. "Swish Swish" is a house-inspired EDM song. Raisa Bruner of Time defined it as a hip hop song. It starts with a sparse piano, before the "club-ready beat" kicks in. Lyrically, "Swish Swish" uses basketball metaphors to talk about getting over the haters. As added by Da'Shan Smith of Billboard "'Swish Swish' "is targeted towards a 'sheep' who is 'calculated' but not capable of bringing down Perry's spirits." Perry stated "Swish Swish" represents "a liberation from all the negative that doesn't serve you" as part of the "360-degree liberation" theme of her Witness album. She also called it a "great anthem for people to use when someone's trying to hold you down or bully you". The song starts with Perry comparing herself to a tiger, "declaring that one 'don't lose no sleep/ don't need opinions/ from a shellfish or a sheep.'" During the song, she calls herself a "courtside killer queen". Minaj's rap alludes to her "silly rap beefs" as well as Migos.

Following its release, several publications suggested that "Swish Swish" was a diss track in response to Taylor Swift's "Bad Blood" (2014), which was believed to be about Perry. Before the song being released, Perry was asked if there was a reaction to "Bad Blood" on Witness, with Perry replying: "I think [my new album is] a very empowered record. There is no one thing that's calling out any one person. One thing to note is: You can't mistake kindness for weakness and don't come for me. Anyone. Anyone. Anyone. Anyone. And that's not to any one person and don't quote me that it is, because it's not. It's not about that. Honestly, when women come together and they decide to unite, this world is going to be a better place. Period end of story. But, let me say this: Everything has a reaction or a consequence so don't forget about that, okay, honey." When asked if the song was directed at anyone in particular on The Tonight Show Starring Jimmy Fallon, Perry simply replied that the song is an anti-bullying anthem. Additionally, Nicki Minaj's verse contains the line, "Silly rap beefs just get me more checks," which addresses Minaj's own purported "beef" with rapper Remy Ma, while also referring to her as a stan. On May 22, 2017, while appearing on the Carpool Karaoke segment on The Late Late Show with James Corden, after singing to "Swish Swish", James Corden asked Perry about a 2013 feud between her and Swift. "There's a situation. [...] Honestly, it's really like she started it, and it's time for her to finish it." She also added: "[T]here is the law of cause and effect. You do something, there's going to be a reaction, and trust me daddy, there's going to be a reaction. It's all about karma, right?."

== Critical reception ==
"Swish Swish" divided music critics at the time of its release. Leonie Cooper of NME was very positive, noting that "calling in Nicki Minaj's fast and furious flow for the Fatboy Slim-sampling 'Swish Swish', meanwhile, is something of a master stroke, turning a good song into a great one." Raisa Bruner of Time defined the song as "a feisty hip-hop track that lets both artists show off their respective areas of expertise". Rianne Houghton of Digital Spy called it "a sexy, shady banger, and it's all about keeping receipts." Hannah J Davies of The Guardian claimed that the song "is a house-fuelled banger with undeniable groove and nonsense content." Kevin O'Donnell of Entertainment Weekly called "Swish Swish" "one of the best party-starters of her career, destined for some killer remixes," also praising the "fiery verse" from Nicki Minaj.

Nylon writer Sydney Gore also praised Minaj for being "absolutely ruthless when she comes in toward the end." Kitty Empire of The Observer also noted that "the Roland Clark sample" and "the ever-inventive Nicki Minaj, provides more top-flight, shade-throwing diva product." Sal Cinquemani of Slant Magazine praised how Perry "convincingly dabbles in house" in the song. Wren Graves for Consequence picked as the album's standout track, defining it as a "spunky, funky kiss-off track with a spellbinding beat by Duke Dumont, [where] Perry is deadly with her put-downs" and "Nicki Minaj is trotted out for punchline duty and punches gamely." Stephen Thomas Erlewine of AllMusic also selected it as a highlight from the album. Mikael Wood of Los Angeles Times thought the song was "a delight as Perry rhymes 'another one in the basket' with 'another one in the casket' over Duke Dumont's thrusting '90s-house beat".

Jillian Mapes of Pitchfork was less favorable, declaring: "If you're going to do something as tired as fueling this beef, at least give us the satisfaction of making it deliciously shady." Anna Gaca of Spin called it "another single that makes little sense", and "a random grab bag of Perry's vocals, obnoxious voice-altering effects, and piano flourishes, all laid over a house-inflected beat". Gavin Miller of Drowned in Sound was mixed in his review, calling "largely just a deep house track with Katy Perry singing a topline, which isn't a bad thing," but felt the producers were "just offering up tunes they've had on their hard drives for Perry's team to compartmentalise and see what demographics they represent." Neil McCormick of The Daily Telegraph felt the song was "too generic to land any blows".

Retrospectively, Christopher Rosa of Glamour called the song a "moment of brilliance" on Witness with its "basement rave-ready beat and cheeky lyrics". He also ranked "Swish Swish" as Perry's overall 8th best track made. Entertainment Weekly deemed it her 10th best song and a "vogue-worthy tribute to 90's house music, complete with hissing hi-hats, endearingly goofy lyrics", adding that Minaj's guest verse was "gag-worthy".

== Accolades ==
=== Awards and nominations ===
Name of award, year listed, category, and result
Award	Year	Category	Result	Ref.
iHeartRadio Music Awards	2018	Best Music Video	Nominated	
Nickelodeon Kids' Choice Awards	2018	Favorite Dance Trend (Note: "The Backpack Kid"/"Swish Swish" live performance on the Saturday Night Live season finale won the award.)	Won	

=== Listicles ===
Name of publication, year listed, name of listicle, and result
Publication	Year	Listicle	Result	Ref.
The Line of Best Fit	2017	Best Songs of the Year	42nd	
Revolt	2024	Best Pop Songs with a Rap Verse	7th	

== Commercial performance ==
In the United States, "Swish Swish" debuted and peaked at number 46 on the Billboard Hot 100 while reaching number 33 on the Pop Songs chart. The song fared better on the Dance Club Songs chart, becoming her 18th number-one on the chart. By having eighteen songs at the top, Perry became the fifth singer with most number-ones on the Dance Club charts and extended her record for most consecutive number-one songs on the chart. As of September 2017, it has sold 165,288 copies in the country, and has been certified Platinum by the Recording Industry Association of America (RIAA). In Canada, the song first opened at number 27 on the Canadian Hot 100. "Swish Swish" later climbed to number 13, becoming Perry's 22nd top-twenty entry in the nation. It has since been certified Platinum by Music Canada (MC) for shipments of 80,000 units.

In Australia, "Swish Swish" first entered at number 37 on the ARIA Charts on June 4, 2017, before peaking at number 22 in July. In the United Kingdom, "Swish Swish" debuted at number 40 on the UK Singles Chart. It ascended to number 29 following the music video's release as well as Perry and Minaj's live performance of the track at the 2017 MTV Video Music Awards, and later reached number 19 in the nation. "Swish Swish" has also been certified Platinum by the British Phonographic Industry (BPI) for shipments of 600,000 units.

In Germany, "Swish Swish" became Perry's lowest charting single, peaking at number 76. The single got certified Gold by BMVI for shipments of 200,000 units.

In France, the song peaked at number 117 and stayed on the chart for 7 weeks. It was the 34th entry in the French Singles Chart for Minaj and her 5th entry in 2017, becoming the only female rapper having the most entries that year in the country. The song was certified gold, becoming Perry's fourth gold certification and Minaj's fifth.

== Music video ==
=== Development ===
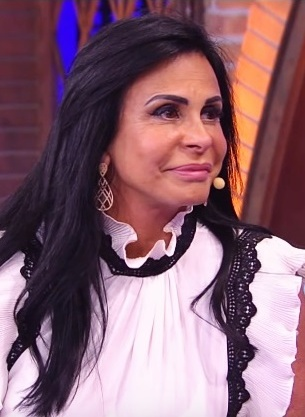
Brazilian singer Gretchen appeared in the song's lyric video.

A lyric video for the song was released on YouTube on July 3, 2017, and features Brazilian singer and reality television personality Gretchen. It was directed by Dario Vetere, and it features choreography by Fabio Duarte and CK Calasans. Two days later, Perry announced a contest titled the "#SwishSwishChallenge" for dancers to appear in the song's official music video where candidates submit videos of themselves dancing, and she would select her favorite dancer. After applicants posted their entries by the end of July 12, the video was filmed later in the month. A teaser for the official video was posted on August 21, 2017, on Perry's personal YouTube account.

=== Synopsis and reception ===
The official music video for the single was directed by Dave Meyers and released on August 24, 2017. It was shot at Bingo Stadium in Onomichi, Hiroshima, Japan. It includes appearances from Russell Horning, Gaten Matarazzo, Jenna Ushkowitz, Doug the Pug, Christine Sydelko, Dexter Mayfield, Rob Gronkowski, Joey Chestnut, Molly Shannon, Hafþór Júlíus Björnsson, Karl-Anthony Towns, Rich Eisen, Bill Walton, and Terry Crews. Awesome Kong, Britney Young, Sydelle Noel, Ellen Wong, and Jackie Tohn make appearances as their characters from GLOW. In the video, Perry plays "Kobe Perry" the captain of the basketball team "The Tigers" whose opponents are known as "The Sheep", and Minaj performs during the game's halftime show. The video also features the brief reappearance of Kathy Beth Terry, Perry's character from "Last Friday Night (T.G.I.F.)", as well as a short gameplay clip from Just Dance 2018 and a brief segment featuring the Bag Raiders song, "Shooting Stars". The Kazimierz Górski National Stadium in Warsaw, Poland, was used for exterior views of the venue in the video. The official music video has over 687 million views on YouTube as of July 2024.

Elias Leight of Rolling Stone named it "goofy". Dave Holmes of Esquire noted that "like all great pop music videos, 'Swish Swish' leaves you exhausted, annoyed, confused, and a good seven years older than you were six minutes ago. It's a shame, too, because when Katy Perry stops trying to be your hilarious best friend, she's capable of great pop music." Jordan Sargent of Spin wrote that the video was "bad", though added "it does at least feel like Katy Perry in all her messy glory. Still, there's a gulf between Perry's slapstick character and the fang-toothed, confrontational song that's impossible to bridge. As such, Perry barely even performs the song during the video. Instead, it's as if 'Swish Swish' is the music playing softly behind a comedy sketch that you're not really meant to pay attention to."

== Live performances ==
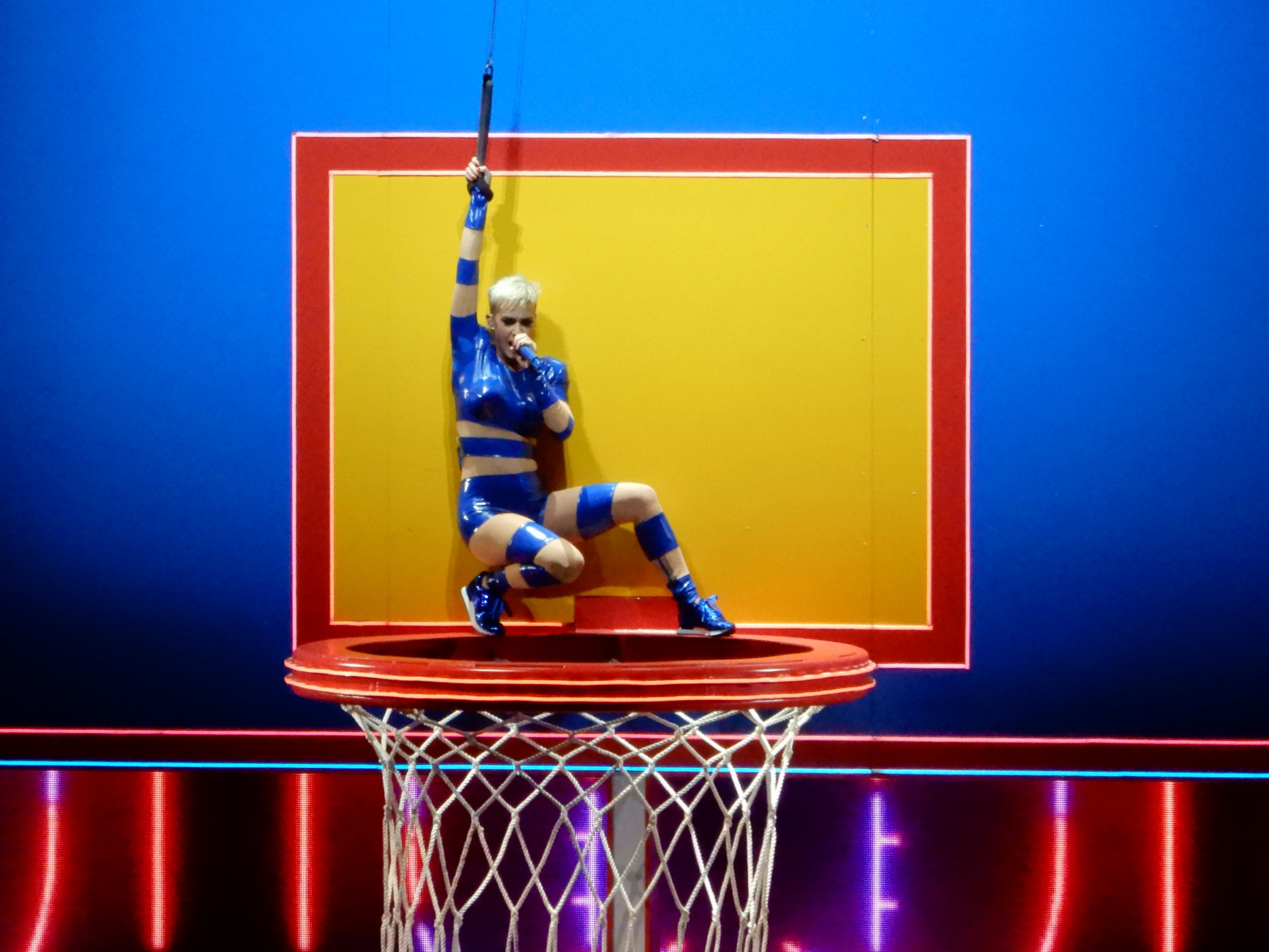
Perry performing the song during her Witness: The Tour, in a basketball themed setting

Perry performed "Swish Swish" solo on the Saturday Night Live season finale on May 20, 2017. The performance quickly went viral, with much of the attention coming towards teen dancer Russell Horning, dubbed the "Backpack Kid", whose arm-swinging dance move ("the Floss") became widely imitated. Perry also performed the song during her set on BBC Radio 1's Big Weekend on May 27, 2017, the Glastonbury Festival 2017 on June 24, 2017, as well as on The Voice finale on July 2, 2017, featuring male dancers in high heels. On June 26, Minaj performed a verse of the song at the first-ever 2017 NBA Awards. Perry also performed the song live with Minaj for the first time at the 2017 MTV Video Music Awards. Billboard's Joe Lynch stated that Perry started the performance "standing atop an enormous half-basketball on stage." Lynch added "her backup dancers sport[ed] nets-for-veils on their faces", while later "the half-basketball rotated around to reveal Nicki Minaj hidden inside." Near the end of the performance, Perry flew "above the crowd and landing atop a basketball hoop just in time to end the show on a literal slam dunk while basketball balloons dropped over the crowd." The song was also performed on Perry's Witness: The Tour. Halfway through the performance, Perry invited a member from the audience onstage for a basketball shooting contest.

== Track listing ==
- Digital download
1. "Swish Swish" (featuring Nicki Minaj) – 4:02
- Digital download (Cheat Codes remix)
1. "Swish Swish" (Cheat Codes remix; featuring Nicki Minaj) – 3:01
- Digital download (Valentino Khan remix)
1. "Swish Swish" (Valentino Khan remix; featuring Nicki Minaj) – 3:20
- Digital download (Blonde remix)
1. "Swish Swish" (Blonde remix) – 4:06

== Credits and personnel ==
=== Recording locations ===
- Recorded at Unsub Studios (Los Angeles, California), Blasé Boys Studios (Hertfordshire, England), Jungle City Studios (New York City, New York) and Glenwood Place Studios (Burbank, California)
- Mixed at MixStar Studios (Virginia Beach, Virginia)
- Mastered at Sterling Sound (New York City, New York)

=== Personnel ===
- Katy Perry – lead vocals, songwriter
- Nicki Minaj – featured vocals, songwriter
- Duke Dumont – songwriter, producer, synths, drums, programming
- PJ "Promnite" Sledge – songwriter, additional producer, keyboards
- Noah "Mailbox" Passovoy – additional producer, engineering, vocal producer, additional keys, programming
- Sarah Hudson – songwriter
- Rachael Findlen – engineering
- Zeke Mishanec – engineering assistant
- Aubry "Big Juice" Delaine – additional engineering, vocals recording (Nicki Minaj)
- Ian Findlay – vocals engineering assistant (Nicki Minaj)
- Serban Ghenea – mixing
- John Hanes – mixing engineering
- Randy Merrill – mastering

Credits and personnel adapted from Witness album liner notes.

== Charts ==
=== Weekly charts ===
Weekly chart performance
Chart (2017–2018)	Peak position
Argentina Anglo (Monitor Latino)	16
Australia (ARIA)	22
Austria (Ö3 Austria Top 40)	69
Belgium (Ultratip Bubbling Under Flanders)	3
Belgium (Ultratop 50 Wallonia)	14
Canada Hot 100 (Billboard)	13
Canada CHR/Top 40 (Billboard)	34
CIS Airplay (TopHit)	55
Colombia (National-Report)	90
Croatia (HRT)	37
Czech Republic Airplay (ČNS IFPI)	61
Czech Republic Singles Digital (ČNS IFPI)	41
Euro Digital Song Sales (Billboard)	10
Finland Airplay (Radiosoittolista)	44
Finland Download (Latauslista)	10
Finland Stream (Streamlista)	28
France (SNEP)	117
Germany (GfK)	76
Hungary (Single Top 40)	17
Ireland (IRMA)	28
Israel (Media Forest TV Airplay)	1
Italy (FIMI)	73
Lebanon (Lebanese Top 20)	8
Mexico (Billboard Mexican Airplay)	11
Netherlands (Dutch Top 40)	28
Netherlands (Single Top 100)	53
New Zealand Heatseekers (RMNZ)	3
Philippines (Philippine Hot 100)	5
Poland Airplay (ZPAV)	16
Portugal (AFP)	45
Romania (Airplay 100)	54
Russia Airplay (TopHit)	66
Scottish Singles Sales (Official Charts)	7
Slovakia Singles Digital (ČNS IFPI)	37
Spain (Promusicae)	61
Sweden (Sverigetopplistan)	53
Switzerland (Schweizer Hitparade)	46
UK Singles (Official Charts)	19
UK Dance (Official Charts)	3
Ukraine Airplay (TopHit)	33
US Billboard Hot 100	46
US Dance Club Songs (Billboard)	1
US Hot Dance/Electronic Songs (Billboard)	6
US Pop Airplay (Billboard)	33
Venezuela English (Record Report)	4

=== Monthly charts ===
Monthly chart performance
Chart (2017–2018)	Peak position
Russia Airplay (TopHit)	91
Ukraine Airplay (TopHit)	67

=== Year-end charts ===
Year-end chart performance
Chart (2017)	Position
Brazil (Pro-Música Brasil)	143
Canada (Canadian Hot 100)	90
Costa Rica (Monitor Latino)	34
El Salvador (Monitor Latino)	42
Honduras (Monitor Latino)	20
Paraguay (Monitor Latino)	90
US Dance Club Songs (Billboard)	13
US Hot Dance/Electronic Songs (Billboard)	18

== Certifications ==
Certifications and sales
Region	Certification	Certified units/sales
Australia (ARIA)	2× Platinum	140,000^{‡}
Brazil (Pro-Música Brasil)	Diamond	250,000^{‡}
Canada (Music Canada)	Platinum	80,000^{‡}
Denmark (IFPI Danmark)	Gold	45,000^{‡}
Finland	3× Platinum	12,000
France (SNEP)	Gold	66,666^{‡}
Germany (BVMI)	Gold	200,000^{‡}
Italy (FIMI)	Gold	25,000^{‡}
New Zealand (RMNZ)	Platinum	30,000^{‡}
Norway (IFPI Norway)	Gold	30,000^{‡}
Poland (ZPAV)	Platinum	50,000^{‡}
Portugal (AFP)	Gold	5,000^{‡}
Spain (Promusicae)	Gold	30,000^{‡}
United Kingdom (BPI)	Platinum	600,000^{‡}
United States (RIAA)	Platinum	1,000,000^{‡} / 165,288 (Note: United States sales figures as of September 2017.)
^{‡} Sales+streaming figures based on certification alone.

== Release history ==
List of release dates, showing region, release format, and label
Region	Date	Format	Version	Label	Ref.
Various	May 19, 2017	Digital download	Original	Capitol	
United States	May 26, 2017	Contemporary hit radio	Original	Capitol	
Various	June 30, 2017	Digital download	Cheat Codes remix	Capitol	
Various	June 30, 2017	Digital download	Valentino Khan remix	Capitol	
Various	August 25, 2017	Digital download	Blonde remix	Capitol	
Italy	September 22, 2017	Radio airplay	Original	Universal	

== See also ==
- List of Billboard Dance Club Songs number ones of 2017
