= Hey (surname) =

Hey is a surname. Notable people with the surname include:

- Antoine Hey – German footballer and manager
- Dale Hey (1947–2012), Canadian-born American professional wrestler better known as Buddy Roberts
- David Hey (1938–2016), English historian
- Donald Holroyde Hey (1904–1987), British organic chemist
- Jerry Hey (born 1950), American musician
- Jonathan Hey (born 1979), information scientist
- Tony Hey (born 1946), British computer scientist
- Vic Hey (1912–1995), Australian rugby league footballer
- Virginia Hey (born 1952), Australian actress
- William Hey (surgeon) (1736–1819), English surgeon
