= Witness (Katy Perry album) =

Studio album by Katy Perry
- Released: June 9, 2017
- Recorded: 2016–2017
- Studios: Australia (The Grove); Atlanta, Georgia (Tree Sound, Snow Problem Park Place Plaza); Burbank, California (Glenwood Place); Los Angeles (MXM, Lama Lama, Unsub, Blasé Boys Club, Green Oak, Henson Recording, The Record Plant); Stockholm, Sweden (MXM, Wolf Cousins); Santa Barbara, California (Secret Garden); New York (Jungle City)
- Genres: Electropop; dance-pop
- Length: 57:28
- Label: Capitol
- Producers: Max Martin; Ali Payami; Shellback; Corin Roddick; Jeff Bhasker; Mark Crew; Duke Dumont; Jack Garratt; Oscar Holter; Illangelo; Ilya; Elof Loelv; Mike Will Made It; Dustin O'Halloran; Rationale; Scooly; Felix Snow

Katy Perry chronology
Prism (2013)	Witness (2017)	Smile (2020)

Singles from Witness
- 1. "Chained to the Rhythm" Released: February 10, 2017; 2. "Bon Appétit" Released: April 28, 2017; 3. "Swish Swish" Released: May 19, 2017; 4. "Save as Draft" Released: June 26, 2017; 5. "Hey Hey Hey" Released: January 12, 2018

Witness is the fifth studio album by the American singer-songwriter Katy Perry. It was released on June 9, 2017, by Capitol Records. After releasing Prism (2013) and touring in 2014–2015, she went on hiatus to protect her mental health and to return afresh.

For the album, Perry worked with numerous producers, including Jeff Bhasker, Mark Crew, Duke Dumont, Jack Garratt, Oscar Holter, Illangelo, Ilya, Max Martin, Ali Payami and Shellback. The album features guest appearances from Nicki Minaj, Skip Marley, and the Migos. Witness is an electropop album that delves into dance-pop and EDM genres, with lyrics on self-empowerment and feminism. Perry described it as an album of "liberation" and "purposeful pop".

Five singles aided Witness, out of which, three were released before the album and one reached the top-ten of the Billboard Hot 100 chart: the lead single, "Chained to the Rhythm" featuring Skip Marley, peaked at number four on the Hot 100. "Bon Appétit" featuring Migos peaked at number 59, while "Swish Swish" featuring Nicki Minaj reached number 46. "Save as Draft" and "Hey Hey Hey" were released as subsequent singles on June 26, 2017 and January 12, 2018, respectively, with "Hey Hey Hey" receiving a music video. To support the album's release, Perry broadcast herself on a four-day YouTube live-stream, titled Katy Perry Live: Witness World Wide.

Upon release, critics were divided towards the album. Some criticized the production and lyricism, while others welcomed the album's personal nature and singled out certain tracks for praise. The album also topped the charts in Canada and Spain, and the United States while reaching the top five in Belgium (Wallonia), the Czech Republic, Finland, France, Greece, Ireland, New Zealand, Norway, and Slovakia. It has sold 1.25 million copies worldwide and received Platinum or higher certifications in Canada, Finland, India, Mexico, Norway, and Poland. To promote the album, Perry embarked on her fourth concert tour, Witness: The Tour, during 2017 and 2018.

== Development ==
Following the release of her fourth album Prism in 2013 and the end of the Prismatic World Tour in October 2015, Katy Perry decided to take a hiatus after the tour concluded to "give my mental health a break". She told The New York Times in February 2016 that she was in the "research and development phase" of a new album, before starting to write new songs that June. Perry felt "refreshed" after the hiatus, and had over 40 tracks "in progress" before the year ended, changing her hair color to blonde short hair from her long black hair in the past. In August, the singer stated that she aspired to make material "that connects and relates and inspires" and told Ryan Seacrest that she was "not rushing" her fifth album, adding: "I'm just having a lot of fun, but experimenting and trying different producers, and different collaborators, and different styles." The album marked a departure from long time producer and co-writer Dr. Luke. In February 2017, Perry stated that the album was "definitely a new era for me" and "an era of purposeful pop" she was proud of. Later that month, she told Capital FM that "I've got something swirling, but I think I want to put out some songs first before I give them the full meal." The following May, Perry revealed to Entertainment Weekly that the album would include 15 of the 40 songs she wrote for it, and described the record as "fun and dance-y and dark and light."

The album was partially inspired by Hillary Clinton's loss in the 2016 United States presidential election. Perry, a vocal supporter of Clinton, claimed "I was definitely not okay [after the election]. I couldn't write a happy-go-lucky song. I wasn't in that place but I also don't want to preach to people because I'm not that person either. I want to empower people and lift people up." Perry had previously performed at Clinton's 2016 presidential campaign in Philadelphia.

== Composition ==
Witness is an electropop album, containing influences of dance and EDM. As analyzed by Annie Zaleski from The A.V. Club, hooks are in short supply, replaced by grooves and atmosphere that pick and choose elements from 1990s house music, mainstream EDM, electro-tinged hip-hop, and 1980s new wave.

Witness opens with the title track, an electronic song backed by a 1990s house piano. "Hey Hey Hey" asserts that women can be complex people with a multitude of personality traits, as noted by Annie Zaleski from The A.V. Club, "Hey Hey Hey" depicts a narrow version of femininity and success and it perpetuates irksome stereotypes about strong women. "Roulette" is an EDM song described as "explosive" by Christopher R. Weingarten from Rolling Stone. "Swish Swish" runs throughout a house-influenced beat and contains a sample from "Star 69" by Fatboy Slim which itself samples "I Get Deep" by Roland Clark. "Déjà Vu" is "an electro-R&B ballad about wanting to free oneself from a dead-end relationship." "Power" explores a theme of self empowerment, Jillian Males from Pitchfork noted that the song "approximates feminism by politicizing a personal struggle for control."

== Artwork ==
Commenting on the concept of the album cover, Perry said,

"Music has allowed me to travel, which has reeducated my mind and changed my perspective on so much, so my education and my consciousness comes from my voice, and that's how I see, and that's how I witness you and that's how you witness me and that's why the eye is in the mouth."

On September 29, 2017, Urban Outfitters released a limited-edition exclusive vinyl of the album with alternate cover art.

Billboard's Tatiana Cirisano listed the album cover as one of the worst of 2017, characterizing its "freaky alien theme" as "just a tad too horrifying".

== Promotion ==
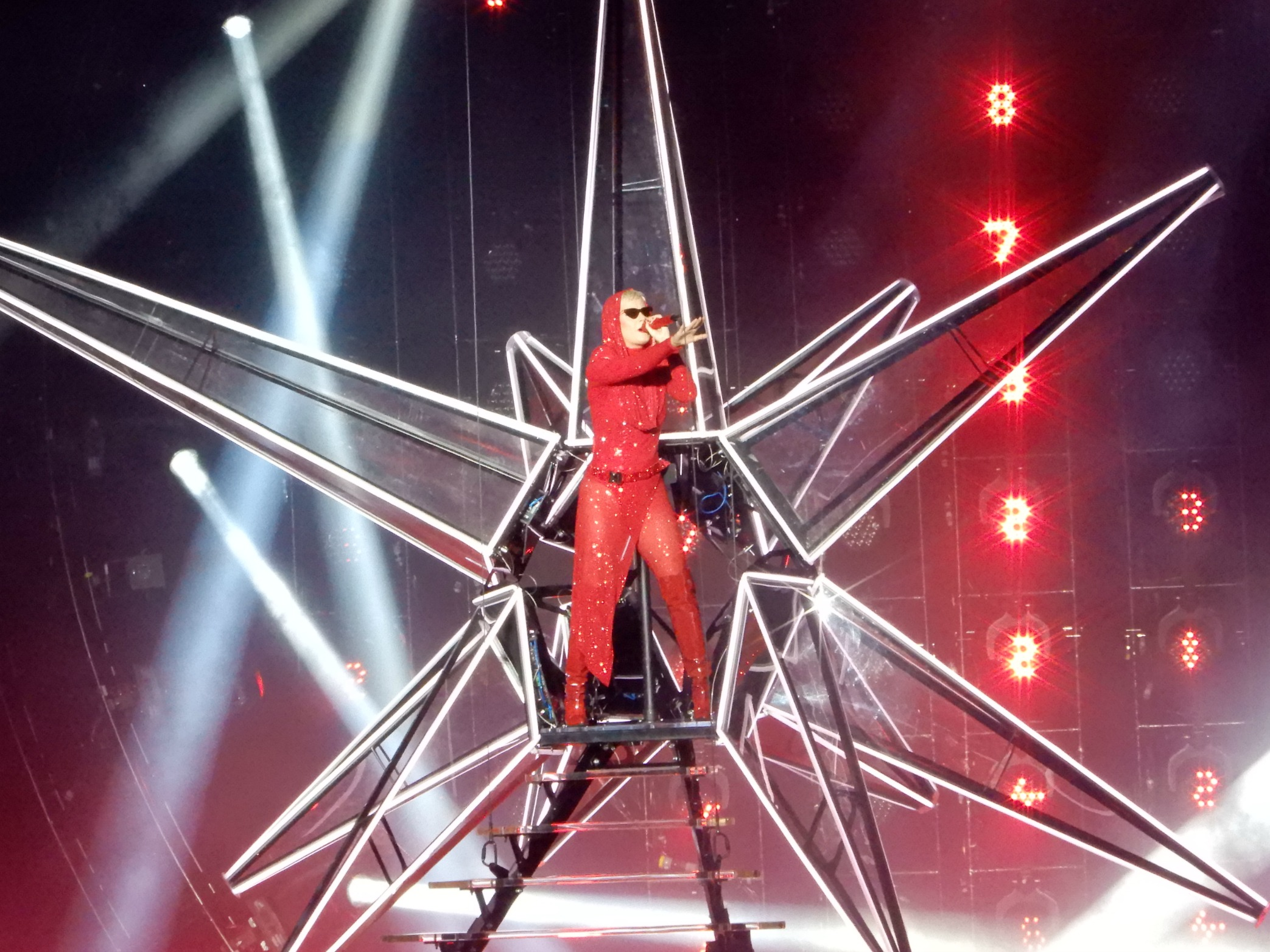
Perry performing the album's title-track during Witness: The Tour at Madison Square Garden

In February 2017, Spotify announced that it would run a campaign to promote the album up to its release in the middle of the year. On May 15, Perry confirmed the album would be titled Witness and would be released through Capitol Records on June 9, 2017. She also announced that the concert tour supporting the album would be titled Witness: The Tour. It began in September 2017 and concluded in August 2018. Tickets purchased would include a copy of the album. The night before Witness came out, she hosted a live countdown for the record on her YouTube channel, which featured the singer performing and discussing tracks on the record as well as responding to fan questions. To accompany the album's release, Perry also broadcast herself on YouTube with a live-stream titled Katy Perry Live: Witness World Wide for four days, concluding with a live concert on June 12.

=== Singles ===
The album's lead single, "Chained to the Rhythm" featuring Skip Marley, was released on February 10, 2017. It went on to top the charts in Hungary while reaching number four in the United States. "Bon Appétit" with Migos followed as the second single on April 28, 2017. The track reached number 59 in the United States and number 14 in Canada. "Swish Swish", featuring Nicki Minaj, was released as the third single on May 19, 2017. The song peaked at number 46 in the United States, and number 13 in Canada. "Save as Draft" was released to American radio stations on June 26, 2017, and "Hey Hey Hey" was released in Italy as the album's fifth single on January 12, 2018.

== Critical reception ==
Professional ratings
Aggregate scores
Source	Rating
AnyDecentMusic?	5.4/10
Metacritic	53/100
Review scores
Source	Rating
AllMusic	2/5 stars
The A.V. Club	C−
Consequence of Sound	C
The Daily Telegraph	2/5 stars
Entertainment Weekly	B
The Guardian	4/5 stars
NME	4/5 stars
Pitchfork	4.8/10
Rolling Stone	3/5 stars
Slant Magazine	3/5 stars

Witness was met with mixed reception from music critics. At Metacritic, which assigns a normalized rating out of 100 to reviews from mainstream critics, the album received an average score of 53, based on 20 reviews, which indicates "mixed or average reviews".

Hannah J. Davies of The Guardian gave the album a rating of 4 out of 5 stars, writing that the singer "still has a flair for tunes that quickly seep into the collective consciousness" and praised "Swish Swish" as "a house-fuelled banger with undeniable groove," though felt that "Perry's heartfelt ballads feel tacked on in the face of all this weirdness." Leonie Cooper from NME gave it the same rating and complimented the same track, arguing that while the album lacked subtlety, this is justified when "[delivering] important messages about female autonomy to a young audience". USA Today's Maeve McDermott commended the album for being "sonically coherent" and noted it as a personal record, rather than the politically charged one that the marketing campaign for it had suggested.

Kevin O'Donnell of Entertainment Weekly gave it a B rating stating, "Perry is reflective, anxious, and fired up on Witness," highlighting "Déjà Vu" and "Swish Swish" as the best tracks. Wren Graves from Consequence of Sound gave the album a rating of C. He listed "Swish Swish", "Power", and "Déjà Vu" as essential tracks, but felt that most of the other songs were more of a "filler," and that a lack of cohesiveness with Perry's output made Witness inferior to her previous material.

Giving Witness 3 out of 5 stars, Christopher R. Weingarten wrote in Rolling Stone that it was comparable to the music of Halsey and Camila Cabello, and that the songs blended "into the rest of the radio." He also did not like how Perry's voice was "devoured in effects and reverb." Sal Cinquemani gave the same score, praising the empowerment themes within "Hey Hey Hey" and "Power", though ultimately felt that the record "lacks both the big hooks that propelled Perry's past hits up the charts and the conceptual and sonic focus to give her pop real purpose."

AllMusic's Stephen Thomas Erlewine gave the album 2 out of 5 stars, saying it felt "relentless and a shade desperate" and called the record "a conceptual muddle." He added that Witness "erodes whatever adult contemporary progress Perry made with Prism." The Daily Telegraph journalist Neil McCormick gave Witness the same rating, and panned the usage of the term "purposeful pop" for the songs. He found Witness to be musically repetitive, explaining that within the multitude of people working on the record, Perry's "individual talent" was lost making "Witness [sound like] someone trying to cover too many bases."

Writing for The Independent, Andy Gill also rated the record 2 out of 5 stars. He criticized the production of the tracks, especially the ones by Max Martin, describing them as "identical to everyone else's." Mikael Wood from the Los Angeles Times shared a similar view in his analysis of the album. Wood was critical of the musical direction on Witness, the supposed "purposeful pop" being lost in the tracks and Perry's singing. He listed "Chained to the Rhythm" and "Swish Swish" as highlights. According to Jordan Sargent from Spin, the record "feels like it's making a bid for a level of artistic seriousness—a recognition of aesthetic vision—that Perry has never really been afforded." He felt that it indicated her "artillery of undeniable pop songs" had been "all but depleted." Variety writer Chris Willman did not feel album was "the kind of obvious smash to which all of America would plainly say: Baby, you're a firework," but asserted it "counts at least as a sparkler — the kind you hold in your hand for 45 seconds in the summer, if not the enduring."

=== Accolades ===
Publication	Accolade	Year	Rank	Ref.
Drowned in Sound	Drowned in Sound's Favourite Albums of 2017	2017	46	

== Commercial performance ==
In the United States, Witness debuted at number one on the Billboard 200 with 180,000 album-equivalent units, which included 162,000 pure album sales. It became Perry's third album to top the country's chart after Teenage Dream (2010) and Prism (2013) both debuted at number one. The record had the highest opening in the US for a female since Lady Gaga's Joanne in 2016 and became the second album by a female artist from 2017, after Halsey's Hopeless Fountain Kingdom, to open atop the chart. Witness dropped to number 13 on the Billboard 200 the following week, earning 28,000 album-equivalent units and selling 18,000 pure copies; it spent a total of 23 weeks on the chart. According to Billboard, it was the country's eighth-highest performing album of the 2017 summer season, earning 431,000 album-equivalent units in the nation by September 2017. The album has sold 311,000 pure copies in the US as of August 2020 according to Nielsen Music. Witness also became Perry's third album after Teenage Dream and Prism to open at number one on the Billboard Canadian Albums Chart, selling 23,000 units in its first week. The album subsequently descended to number four the following week. In September 2024, the record was certified two-times Platinum by Music Canada for sales exceeding 160,000 album units.

Witness debuted at number one on the Spanish Albums Chart, becoming Perry's first chart-topping album in Spain. It fell to number 13 in its second week and spent a total of 14 weeks on the chart. In Australia, Witness debuted at number two on the ARIA Albums Chart, selling 5,794 copies. It descended to number six the following week after selling 2,069 copies. The album was later certified Gold by the Australian Recording Industry Association (ARIA) for shifting 35,000 units in the country. In the United Kingdom, Witness debuted at number six on the UK Albums Chart, where it became Perry's third top 10 album, following Teenage Dream and Prism. According to the Official Charts, it opened with 16,153 units in the nation. The album sold 106,206 copies in the UK and was certified Gold by the British Phonographic Industry (BPI). Elsewhere, Witness reached the top five in Belgium (Wallonia), the Czech Republic, Finland, France, Greece, Ireland, New Zealand, Norway, and Slovakia. The album has been certified three-times Platinum in India, and Platinum in Mexico, Norway, and Poland.

The International Federation of the Phonographic Industry (IFPI) reported that Witness was the 15th best-selling album globally in 2017. The album sold 1.25 million pure copies worldwide and garnered over 6.5 billion cumulative streams from various digital platforms.

== Track listing ==
Standard edition
No.	Title	Writer(s)	Producer(s)	Length
1.	"Witness"	Katy Perry; Max Martin; Savan Kotecha; Ali Payami	Martin; Payami	4:10
2.	"Hey Hey Hey"	Perry; Martin; Sia Furler; Payami; Sarah Hudson	Martin; Payami	3:34
3.	"Roulette"	Perry; Martin; Shellback; Payami; Ferras Alqaisi	Martin; Shellback; Payami	3:18
4.	"Swish Swish" (featuring Nicki Minaj)	Perry; Duke Dumont; Hudson; PJ "Promnite" Sledge; Onika Maraj; Brittany Hazzard	Dumont; Sledge^{[c]}; Noah "Mailbox" Passovoy^{[c]}^{[d]}	4:02
5.	"Déjà Vu"	Perry; Hayden James; Alqaisi; Thomas Stell	H. James; Passovoy^{[d]}	3:17
6.	"Power"	Perry; Jack Garratt; William Robinson	Garratt; Passovoy^{[d]}	3:46
7.	"Mind Maze"	Perry; Hudson; Corin Roddick; Megan James	Roddick^{[a]}; Rachael Findlen^{[d]}	4:08
8.	"Miss You More"	Perry; Hudson; Roddick; M. James	Payami^{[b]}; Roddick^{[a]}; Martin^{[d]}; Findlen^{[d]}; Peter Karlsson^{[e]}	3:54
9.	"Chained to the Rhythm" (featuring Skip Marley)	Perry; Martin; Furler; Payami; Skip Marley	Martin; Payami	3:57
10.	"Tsunami"	Perry; Michael Williams; Marcus Bell; Hudson; Mia Moretti	Mike Will Made It; Scooly; Passovoy^{[c]}^{[d]}	3:23
11.	"Bon Appétit" (featuring Migos)	Perry; Martin; Shellback; Oscar Holter; Alqaisi; Quavious Marshall; Kiari Cephus; Kirsnick Ball	Martin; Shellback; Holter	3:47
12.	"Bigger Than Me"	Perry; Hudson; Roddick; M. James	Holter; Roddick^{[a]}; Findlen^{[d]}	4:00
13.	"Save as Draft"	Perry; Noonie Bao; Dijon McFarlane; Nicholas Audino; Lewis Hughes; Elof Loelv	Loelv; Martin^{[d]}	3:48
14.	"Pendulum"	Perry; Jeff Bhasker; Hudson	Bhasker; Illangelo^{[c]}; Passovoy^{[d]}	4:00
15.	"Into Me You See"	Perry; Joe Goddard; Alexis Taylor; Alqaisi	Dustin O'Halloran	4:24
Total length:				57:28

Target and deluxe edition
No.	Title	Writer(s)	Producer(s)	Length
16.	"Dance with the Devil"	Perry; Felix Snow; Hudson	Snow; Passovoy^{[d]}	3:49
17.	"Act My Age"	Perry; Tinashe Fazakerley; Mark Crew; Hudson	Ilya; Rationale; Crew; Passovoy^{[d]}	3:42
Total length:				64:59

Notes

- ^{^[a]} – main and vocal producer
- ^{^[b]} – main and additional vocal producer
- ^{^[c]} – additional producer
- ^{^[d]} – vocal producer
- ^{^[e]} – additional vocal producer
- Japan limited deluxe edition includes a DVD which features the music video and making of the music video of "Chained to the Rhythm".

Sample credits

- "Swish Swish" contains excerpts from "I Get Deep" written by Roland Clark.
- "Power" contains a sample of "Being with You" written and performed by Smokey Robinson.

== Personnel ==
Adapted from the album liner notes.

- Nelson Beato – gospel studio choir (track 14)
- Jeff Bhasker – producer, keyboards and drums programming (track 14)
- Cory Bice – assistant engineer (tracks 1, 2, 3, 9, 11); engineer (track 17)
- Edie Lehmann Boddicker – vocal contracting, gospel choir conducting, gospel studio choir (track 14)
- Alexandra Brown – gospel studio choir (track 14)
- Denise Carite – gospel studio choir (track 14)
- Charlean Carmon – gospel studio choir (track 14)
- Carmen Carter – gospel studio choir (track 14)
- Tom Coyne – mastering (track 9)
- Mark Crew – production, keyboards, programming (track 17)
- Aubry Delaine – additional engineering, Nicki Minaj vocal recording (track 4)
- Francesco Donadello – engineer (track 15)
- Monique Donnelly – gospel studio choir (track 14)
- Duke Dumont – producer, synths, drums, programming (track 4)
- Carmel Echols – gospel studio choir (track 14)
- Luke Edgemon – gospel studio choir (track 14)
- Anthony Evans – gospel studio choir (track 14)
- Rationale – electric guitar, bass, programming (track 17)
- Iain Findlay – vocal assistant engineering (Nicki Minaj's vocals, track 4)
- Rachael Findlen – engineer (tracks 4, 5, 6, 7, 8, 10, 14–17); vocal production (tracks: 7, 8)
- Nicole Franz – art direction
- Sia – background vocals (track 9)
- Jack Garratt – production, all instruments (track 6)
- James Alan Ghaleb – guitar (track 9)
- Serban Ghenea – mixing
- Jim Gilstrap – gospel studio choir (track 14)
- Lauren Gluckman – A&R
- John Hanes – mixing engineer
- Sam Holland – engineer (track 1, 3, 9, 11, 17)
- Oscar Holter – keys (track 11, 12); production, vocal production, programming (track 12)
- Casey Hooper – guitars (track 10)
- Stephen Hybicki – engineer (track 10)
- Illangelo – additional production, additional drum programming (track 14)
- Ilya – production, programming, arranging, drums, percussion, guitars, bass, keys (track 17)
- Clydene Jackson – gospel studio choir (track 14)
- Hayden James – production; guitar, bass, background vocals, synths (track 5)
- Peter Karlsson – vocal editing (tracks 1, 2, 3, 9, 11, 14); additional vocal production (track 8); percussion (track 9)
- Briana Lee – gospel studio choir (track 14)
- Jeremy Lertola – assistant engineer (tracks: 1, 2, 3, 9, 11); engineer (track 17)
- David Loucks – gospel studio choir (track 14)
- Elof Loelv – production, engineer, programming, drums, bass, piano, synthesizers (track 14)
- Ted Lovett – layout
- Skip Marley – featured vocals, background vocals (track 9)
- Max Martin – background vocals, programming, Prophet 6, solina (track 9), percussion; acoustic guitar (track 8); vocal production (tracks: 8, 13), executive producer
- Migos – featured vocals (track 11)
- Jamie McCrary – gospel studio choir (track 14)
- Randy Merrill – mastering
- Zeke Mishanec – assistant engineer (track 4)
- Ryan Nasci – engineer (track 14)
- Dustin O'Halloran – producer, all instruments, arrangement (track 15)
- Pino Palldino – bass (track 14)
- Noah Passovoy – additional keys, programming (track 4, 10); engineer (tracks 4, 6, 10, 14, 16, 17), vocal production (tracks 5, 6, 10, 14, 16, 17); vocal editing (track 7, 12); additional production (tracks 4, 10); percussion (track 10)
- Ali Payami – acoustic guitar (track 1); drums, bass, synths, piano (tracks 1, 8, 9); additional vocal production, programming, keys, electric guitar, background vocals, production (track 8); percussion (tracks 8, 9); hand claps (track 9)
- Louis Price – gospel studio choir (track 14)
- Katy Perry – background vocals (tracks 3, 9), vocals, executive producer
- Daryl McPherson – Migos vocal production
- Joshua Moreau – bass (track 10)
- Corin Roddick – production, vocal production (track 12)
- David Rudnick – front and back cover art direction
- Scooly – production (track 10)
- Aretha Scruggs – gospel studio choir (track 14)
- Tony Scruggs – gospel studio choir (track 14)
- Shellback – production; background vocals (track 3); keys, programming (track 11)
- PJ Sledge – keyboards (track 4)
- Felix Snow – production, vocal manipulations, programming, guitar (track 16)
- Thomas Stell – synths (track 5)
- Carmen Twillie – gospel studio choir (track 14)
- Oren Waters – gospel studio choir (track 14)
- Will Wheaton – gospel studio choir (track 14)
- Mike Will Made It – production (track 10)
- Eyvonne Williams – gospel studio choir (track 14)
- Brandon Winbush – gospel studio choir (track 14)
- Jason Woods – gospel studio choir (track 14)

== Charts ==
=== Weekly charts ===
Chart (2017)	Peak position
Australian Albums (ARIA)	2
Austrian Albums (Ö3 Austria)	6
Belgian Albums (Ultratop Flanders)	8
Belgian Albums (Ultratop Wallonia)	4
Canadian Albums (Billboard)	1
Czech Albums (ČNS IFPI)	3
Danish Albums (Hitlisten)	15
Dutch Albums (Album Top 100)	8
Finnish Albums (Suomen virallinen lista)	3
French Albums (SNEP)	4
German Albums (Offizielle Top 100)	10
Greek Albums (IFPI)	4
Hungarian Albums (MAHASZ)	17
Irish Albums (IRMA)	5
Italian Albums (FIMI)	6
Japanese Albums (Oricon)	19
Japanese Hot Albums (Billboard Japan)	16
Japanese International Albums (Oricon)	4
Mexican Albums (AMPROFON)	2
New Zealand Albums (RMNZ)	2
Norwegian Albums (VG-lista)	5
Polish Albums (ZPAV)	9
Portuguese Albums (AFP)	12
Scottish Albums (Official Charts)	7
Slovak Albums (ČNS IFPI)	4
South Korean Albums (Circle)	78
South Korean International Albums (Circle)	2
Spanish Albums (Promusicae)	1
Swedish Albums (Sverigetopplistan)	7
Swiss Albums (Schweizer Hitparade)	7
UK Albums (Official Charts)	6
US Billboard 200	1

=== Monthly charts ===
Monthly chart performance for Witness
Chart (2017)	Peak position
Argentine Monthly Albums (CAPIF)	4

=== Year-end charts ===
Chart (2017)	Position
Australian Albums (ARIA)	35
Belgian Albums (Ultratop Flanders)	107
Belgian Albums (Ultratop Wallonia)	93
Canadian Albums (Billboard)	39
Dutch Albums (MegaCharts)	93
Italian Albums (FIMI)	92
Mexican Albums (AMPROFON)	50
US Billboard 200	91
Worldwide Albums (IFPI)	15

== Certifications and sales ==
Certifications and sales for Witness
Region	Certification	Certified units/sales
Australia (ARIA)	Gold	35,000^{^}
Austria (IFPI Austria)	Gold	7,500^{‡}
Brazil	Platinum	40,000
Canada (Music Canada)	2× Platinum	160,000^{‡}
Central America	Gold	
Denmark (IFPI Danmark)	Gold	10,000^{‡}
Finland	2× Platinum	40,000
France (SNEP)	Platinum	100,000^{‡}
India (IMI)	3× Platinum	90,000
Italy (FIMI)	Gold	25,000^{‡}
Mexico (AMPROFON)	Platinum	60,000^{‡}
Netherlands (NVPI)	Gold	20,000^{‡}
New Zealand (RMNZ)	Gold	7,500^{‡}
Norway (IFPI Norway)	Platinum	20,000^{‡}
Poland (ZPAV)	Platinum	20,000^{‡}
South Korea	—	5,000
United Kingdom (BPI)	Gold	100,000^{‡}
United States (RIAA)	Gold	500,000^{‡}
Summaries
Worldwide	—	1,250,000
^{^} Shipments figures based on certification alone.^{‡} Sales+streaming figures based on certification alone.

== Release history ==
Region	Date	Edition(s)	Format(s)	Label	Ref.
Various	June 9, 2017	Standard; deluxe	CD; digital download	Capitol	
Various	August 11, 2017	Standard; deluxe	LP	Capitol	

== See also ==
- List of 2017 albums
- List of Billboard 200 number-one albums of 2017
- List of number-one albums of 2017 (Canada)
- List of number-one albums of 2017 (Spain)
- List of UK top-ten albums in 2017
