= Jonathan Hey =

Jonathan Hey (born 1979) is an expert in connecting the abstract concepts of knowledge management with other levels of experiences like language and sensual interaction with the physical world, thus providing not only better understanding of these concepts but key elements of their more precise definition as well. This also enables experts in other fields than information science to incorporate understanding of those abstract levels into their own research.

Besides the extended research about the Theory of Inventive Problem Solving Jonathan Hey presented a study related to the information hierarchy. While emphasizing the transitions between the different levels of data, information, knowledge, and wisdom, Hey enriches the whole model with analytic views about language and concepts. The study is a fundamental part of the training system for ocean data and information management in the International Oceanographic Data and Information Exchange Program (IODE) of the Intergovernmental Oceanographic Commission providing the overview for the topical division Information Technology and Scientific Communication.

== Works ==
=== Published works ===
- 2003: Legardeur, J, Boujut, J-F, Hey, J, Information sharing for knowledge creation during early design phases, 10th ISPE International Conference on Concurrent Engineering, Madeira, 2003.
- 2004: The Data, Information, Knowledge, Wisdom Chain: The Metaphorical link, published at Intergovernmental Oceanographic Commission - OceanTeacher: a training system for ocean data and information management (PDF)
- 2005:
  - Jaspal S. Sandhu, Jonathan Hey, Catherine Newman, Alice M. Agogino, Informal Health and Legal Rights Education in Rural, Agricultural Communities Using Mobile Devices, icalt, pp. 988–992, Fifth IEEE International Conference on Advanced Learning Technologies (ICALT'05), 2005. (Abstract)
  - J. Hey, Scott Carter, Perfect Practice Makes Perfect: The Memory Tennis Accuracy Feedback System, In: IEEE Pervasive Computing, Volume 4, Issue 3 (July 2005)
- 2006
  - Agogino, A, Song, S, Hey, J, Triangulation of Indicators of Successful Student Design Teams, International Journal of Engineering Education, Vol. 22, 1, 2006.
  - Van Pelt, A, Hey, J, Using Triz and Human-Centered Design for Consumer Product Development, TRIZ Future: Proceedings European TRIZ Association (ETRIA) World Conference, Kortrijk, Belgium, 2006.
  - Hey, J, Van Pelt, A, Agogino, A, An Analysis Of Student Reflections From a Multidisciplinary New Product Development Class, Proceedings of American Society of Mechanical Engineering (ASME), International Design Engineering Technical Conferences & Computers and Information in Engineering Conference (IDETC/CIE), September 10–13, Philadelphia, Pennsylvania, USA, 2006.

== See also ==
- DIKW
