= HEI =

HEI may refer to:

== Companies and organizations ==
- HEI Hospitality, an American hotel owner and operator
- Hawaiian Electric Industries, the largest supplier of electricity in the state of Hawaii
- Health Effects Institute, a non-profit focused on the health effects of air pollution
- HEICO, HEI is the stock symbol for HEICO Corporation

== In education ==
- Higher education institution
- Graduate Institute of International and Development Studies (French: Institut universitaire de hautes études internationales et du développement), in Geneva, Switzerland
- Hautes études d'ingénieur, an engineering school in Lille, France

== In language ==
- He (letter), the fifth letter of many Semitic alphabets
- Heiltsuk-Oowekyala language, spoken in Canada

== Places ==
- Heilongjiang, a province of China
- Hei District, Chiba, a former administrative unit of Japan
- Hei Glacier, in Antarctica
- Hei River, in China
- Heide–Büsum Airport, in Schleswig-Holstein, Germany
- Heighington railway station, in England

== In science and technology ==
- Healthy Eating Index, a measure of diet quality
- High-efficiency incandescent, a type of incandescent light bulb
- High energy ignition, an automotive ignition system
- High explosive incendiary, a type of ammunition
- Hot-carrier injection, a principle in the function of solid-state electronic devices
- Human-environment interaction, or Environmental sociology

== Other uses ==
- Hei (album), 2015 album by Norwegian duo Marcus & Martinus
- Hei (Darker than Black), protagonist of the 2007 anime
- Qi, in traditional Chinese culture, a principle forming part of any living thing (Cantonese: hei)

== See also ==
- Hiei (disambiguation)
