= Hire Association Europe =

Lobbying trade association

Hire Association Europe (HAE) is a trade association formed in 1974. It has around 800 member companies. HAE lobbies the government on behalf of its membership. It is a non-profit organization limited by guarantee.
