= Japanese ship Hiei =

At least three warships of Japan have been named Hiei, after Mount Hiei:

- Japanese ironclad Hiei, a 1870s Kongō-class ironclad corvette of the Imperial Japanese Navy.
- Japanese battleship Hiei, a 1912 Kongō-class battlecruiser of the Imperial Japanese Navy.
- JDS Hiei, a Haruna-class destroyer in service with the Japan Maritime Self-Defense Force from 1974 to 2011.
