= Katy Perry Live: Witness World Wide =

2017 YouTube live stream by Katy Perry

Katy Perry Live: Witness World Wide was a four-day YouTube live stream by Katy Perry airing between June 8–12, 2017. The special features Perry living in the Kim Sing Theatre-style house with cameras promoting her fifth studio album, Witness. It began on June 8, and concluded with a free concert on June 12 in Los Angeles.

The live stream featured Perry doing activities in the house, including eating, playing with her dogs, and sleeping as well as other moments that received large amounts of media attention. During a one-hour therapy session, Perry became very emotional as she opened up her life, including a struggle with alcohol abuse, past suicidal ideation, and her relationship with her Evangelical parents. The live stream generated over 49 million views from 190 different countries. A behind-the-scenes special for the live stream titled Will You Be My Witness? premiered on YouTube Red on October 4, 2017.

== Format ==
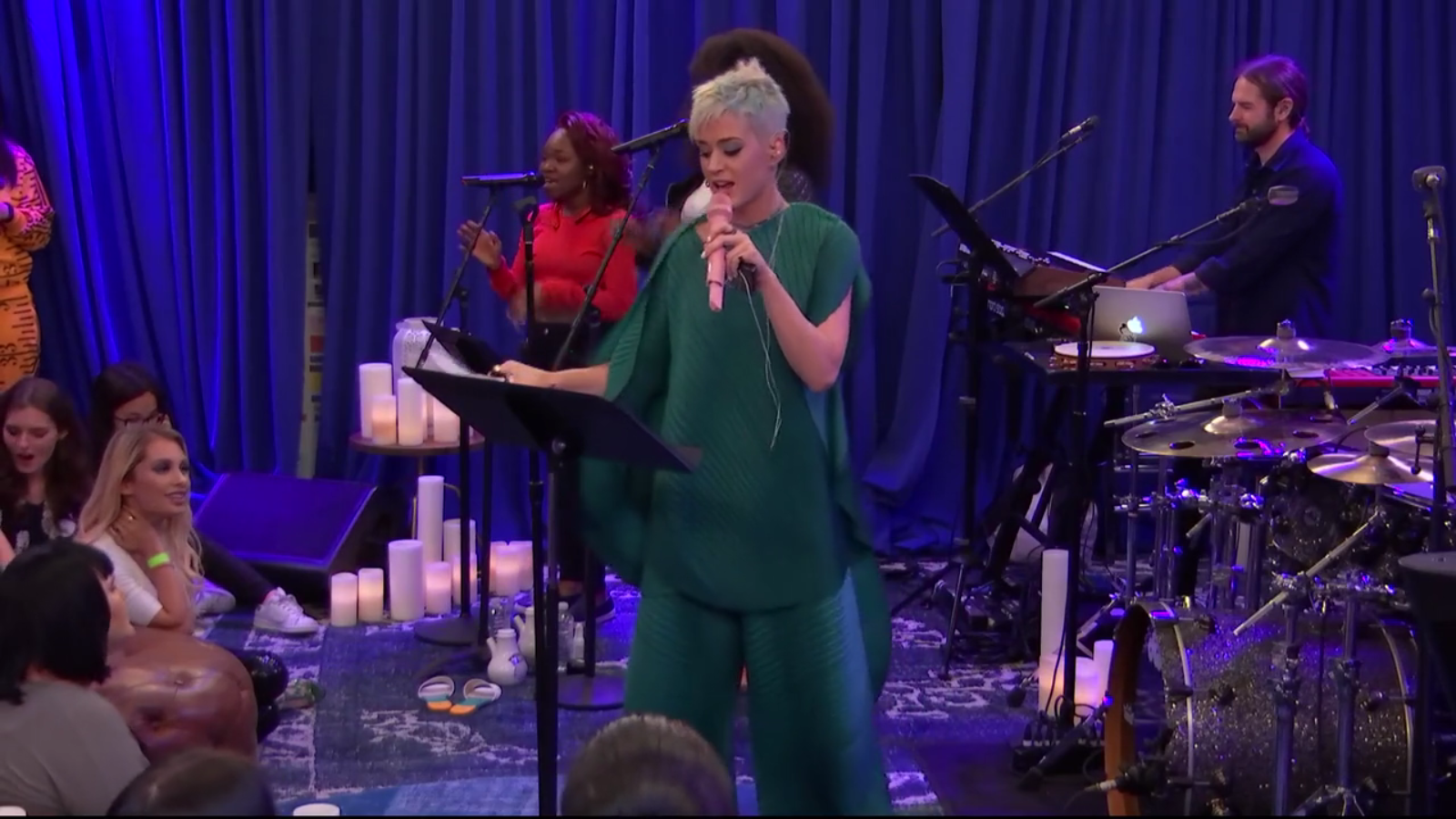
Perry with fans during the livestream

The live stream was filmed at the Kim Sing Theatre that was set up for the event, with 41 cameras throughout and the occupants wearing microphones. It has drawn comparisons to the reality television franchise Big Brother, although it does not feature the "confessionals" typical of the series. In addition to Perry doing everyday activities like sleeping, meditating and playing with her dog, Nugget, the broadcast captures her spending time with her friends, giving interviews, hosting dinner parties and undergoing therapy. She also plans to give a concert with songs from her new album, Witness, which came out the same day as the stream began.

== Live stream highlights ==
=== Guests ===
Perry hosted a large list of celebrity guests and held dinner parties each night during which she and her guests discussed various topics, including politics.

On June 9, Perry did yoga with Jesse Tyler Ferguson and hosted a dinner party with Wonder Woman director Patty Jenkins, actress Anna Kendrick, D.J. Mia Moretti, Australian musician Sia, and burlesque star Dita Von Teese.

On June 10, Perry talked with physicist Neil deGrasse Tyson, and had a competitive cooking session with celebrity chef Gordon Ramsay. She also hosted television personality RuPaul, playing charades and discussed religion. Actress and activist America Ferrera co-hosted a dinner.

On June 11, talk show host James Corden spent time with Perry and her dogs, and then played a truth-or-dare-style game, during which he asked her to rank past lovers. YouTube makeup artist Patrick Starrr did her makeup.

On the evening of June 11, Perry hosted several guests including comedian Margaret Cho, Olympic gold medalist Caitlyn Jenner, activist Van Jones, liberal political commentator Sally Kohn, Republican strategist Ana Navarro, entertainer Amanda Seales and DJ Yung Skeeter. A contest winner named Laura also attended. The dinner quickly turned political, and Jenner, a lifelong Republican, was forced to defend herself as the lone supporter of Donald Trump. On the night of June 11, Perry watched the documentary This is Everything: Gigi Gorgeous with Canadian model Gigi Gorgeous (also known as Gigi Lazzarato), which documents the latter's transition from male to female.

=== Interviews ===
Perry gave several interviews during the livestream. On June 10, Arianna Huffington spoke with Perry for The Thrive Global Podcast. Among the topics was her feud with fellow pop star Taylor Swift, that began with accusations that Perry had "stolen" backup dancers from Swift's tour for her own tour. Perry stated that she forgave Swift and she was sorry for her own part, and hoped they could put it behind them. Perry said, "Maybe I don't agree with everything she does and she doesn't agree with everything I do, but I just really, truly want to come together in a place of love and forgiveness and understanding and compassion."

On June 11, Perry recorded several podcasts, including Michael Ian Black, who interviewed Perry for his podcast, How To Be Amazing with Michael Ian Black. Perry also spoke with civil rights activist DeRay Mckesson, host of Pod Save the People, in which she addressed past accusations against her of cultural appropriation. Perry stated that she regretted wearing cornrows in her music video for "This Is How We Do" (2014), after which she received criticism that led her to ask a black friend why it had upset so many people. Perry told Mckesson, "[Cleo] told me about the power in black women's hair, and how beautiful it is, and the struggle. I listened. And I heard. And I didn't know. And I won't ever understand some of those things because of who I am — I will never understand, but I can educate myself, and that's what I'm trying to do along the way." In response to the interview, Perry received some appreciation for her apology, while others criticized her for not employing a more diverse staff.

In the same interview, Perry also addressed her performance at the 2013 American Music Awards, which featured a Japanese "geisha" theme: "Even in my intention to appreciate Japanese culture, I did it wrong with a performance, and I didn't know that I did it wrong until I heard people saying I did it wrong."

=== Therapy session ===
On June 9, Perry underwent a therapy session with psychologist Siri Sat Nam Singh, host of Viceland's series The Therapist. The session attracted significant media attention as Perry became extremely emotional opening up about painful moments in her life, including a struggle with depression and suicidal thoughts. She talked about the shame she felt about that period of her life, which occurred following her 2012 divorce from Russell Brand, and led her to write the song "By the Grace of God" in 2013. As Perry broke down emotionally, a member of her entourage suggested she end the session, but she declined. She also addressed her sexuality and the reasons why she went public with her feud with Taylor Swift.

Perry, who was born Katheryn Hudson, talked about her pop star persona, saying "the fantasy of Katheryn went into Katy and made this bigger-than-life personality," and shared that her new very short haircut was because she "didn't want to look like Katy Perry anymore."

== Reception ==
Perry received mixed responses from critics for Witness World Wide. Joey Pucino of The Sydney Morning Herald called it a "bizarre publicity stunt." Journalist Amanda Petrusich called it "tedious" and dubbed her therapy breakdown "premeditated," writing in The New Yorker, "Every moment of Witness Worldwide I saw felt heavy with promotional intention, and low on spontaneity or frankness—which is also what makes the album itself a slog."

Others applauded her honesty. In the Australian Daily Telegraph, Sarah Daffy praised Perry and dismissed her critics. Daffy addressed the reality of mental health and suicide in Australia, and pointed out that celebrities sharing their own struggles can have a significant impact on the public. "[Perry has] committed a celebrity crime — the deepest and dirtiest of them all — she chose to be honest... To me, this was the most responsible, emotionally intelligent and mature thing she did in the past four days.... I'm happy that next time I'm having a day of fighting insecurities and putting ridiculous amounts of pressure on myself that I'm able to look up to Katheryn Hudson who decided to put Katy Perry aside for a brief moment to expose a lifetime of truth. It's refreshing to me that Katheryn doesn't completely have her shit together and that she's just given billions of people around the globe the opportunity to feel OK with not having their shit together too — even if only for a moment." Following the event, Daniel D'Addario of Time magazine named the live stream among The Top 10 Television Shows of 2017.
