= Boyce Watkins =

American author and political analyst

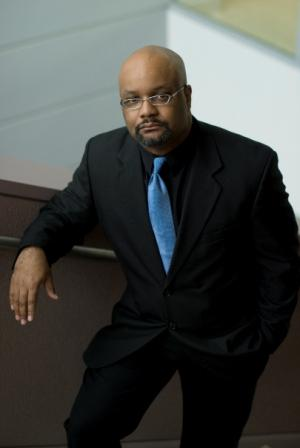
- Watkins in 2008
- Born: June 20, 1971 (age 54); Louisville, Kentucky, U.S.
- Education: University of Kentucky (BA, BS, MS); Ohio State University (PhD)
- Occupation(s): Academic, finance expert, media analyst, influencer
- Website: www.boycewatkins.com

Boyce D. Watkins (born June 20, 1971) is an American author, political analyst, social influencer and ex-academic. In addition to publishing scholarly articles on finance and investing, Watkins is an advocate for education, economic empowerment, and social justice, and has made regular appearances in various national media outlets, including CNN, Good Morning America, MSNBC, Fox News, BET, NPR, Essence, USA Today, Today, ESPN, The Tom Joyner Morning Show, and CBS Sports. He was also a frequent guest on The Wendy Williams Experience radio program, and remains a frequent contributor to the Grio.

== Early life ==
Watkins was born in Louisville, Kentucky, to a teen mother. His father left shortly after his birth and only spoke to his son three times. Watkins' mother, Robin Couch, married when Boyce was 3 years old to Larry Watkins, a young Vietnam veteran from Louisville. The family struggled for years but worked hard for economic advancement.

Watkins' mother encouraged her children to be the best they could be at anything they did. Larry, who would become Watkins' adopted father, was a tough, stern head of the household who joined the local police force at the age of 30.

Watkins struggled in school, earning very poor grades all throughout. His teachers placed him in special education and told him he was not smart enough to go to college. "When I look back on those years as a black boy in a racist state like Kentucky, I get angry", says Watkins. "I almost lost the future that God had in store for me."

In high school, Watkins was captain of his track team. He also had a job working for Taco Bell, along with other fast food restaurants.

Watkins' teenage years were tough. His father was a good provider, but very tough, leading him to feel abandoned and unloved. His uncle, eight years his senior, was regularly sent to prison, which only added to his feelings of abandonment. "Those were tough years for me", says Watkins. "I honestly think my mind has blocked them out." Watkins received a small scholarship to the University of Kentucky, from a group called "Black Achievers", based in Louisville, which was just enough to pay his tuition.

=== Early adulthood and education ===
During his senior year in high school, Watkins met his first girlfriend. Six months after high school graduation, she gave birth to their first and only child. He was a freshman in college at the time, and the child was born during winter break. The pressure of fatherhood further motivated Watkins to work hard in school. It was during his first semester at the University of Kentucky that he earned straight As for the first time in his life.

Watkins went on to win several honors in college, including Freshman of the Year, Sophomore of the Year, and numerous scholarships including The Wall Street Journal Outstanding Graduating Senior in Finance. In 1993, Watkins completed a Bachelor of Science in economics and Bachelors of Arts in finance and business management (a triple major). After graduation, Watkins continued at the University of Kentucky, where he completed a Master of Science in mathematics in 1998.

It was during his time as a graduate student at the University of Kentucky that Watkins became more involved with political activism. The racist language used in his campus newspaper, The Kentucky Kernel, led Watkins to begin writing columns himself. In his work, he challenged the racially divisive foundations of his campus. Watkins also battled with the university president at the time, Charles T. Wethington Jr., referring to him as "Chuck" and claiming that he was racially insensitive and unqualified to be a campus president. Eventually, he went on to pursue his Ph.D. at Ohio State University in Columbus, Ohio.

At Ohio State University, Watkins enrolled in the business administration doctoral program, concentrating in finance. He finished his Ph.D. in 2002. The title of Watkins' dissertation was Investor Sentiment, Trading Patterns and Return Predictability, while working under René M. Stulz, David Hirshleifer, and G. Andrew Karolyi. His first academic position was on the finance faculty at Syracuse University.

=== Career beginnings and Writings ===
In addition to his academic work at Syracuse, Watkins was a visiting scholar with the Barbara Jordan - Mickey Leland School Of Public Affairs at Texas Southern University. He was also a visiting fellow at the Shanghai University of Finance and Economics and the Centre for European Economic Research in Mannheim, Germany.

In 2004, Watkins completed his first book, Everything You Ever Wanted to Know about College: A Guide for Minority Students. The book was a success and began his work in public scholarship. "I wrote this book for all the young kids like me who were told they can't go to college", said Watkins. A few months later, Watkins created his second book, What if George Bush were a Black Man?, a satirical discussion of President George W. Bush and what he perceives as the presence of white privilege in America. Watkins explores the criminal justice system, the educational system, and the economic systems of America, using statistics and anecdotes to describe likely fates for President Bush and other privileged individuals if they were poor and Black.

He authored several financial advice books, including Financial Lovemaking 101: Merging Assets with Your Partner in Ways that Feel Good, Black American Money, as well as The Parental 411: What Every Parent should Know about Their Child in College, and Quick and Dirty Secrets of College Success: A Professor Tells It All. His work has also appeared in such publications as the Journal of Small Business Management and the Journal of Economics and Business.

=== Bill O'Reilly and Juan Williams ===
Watkins has an ongoing feud with Bill O'Reilly from Fox News. Watkins referred to O'Reilly and Sean Hannity as "UnAmerican borderline Klansmen who graduated from the Rush Limbaugh School of Arrogant Self-righteousness". During one CNN episode, after O'Reilly made controversial statements about African Americans during his visit to Sylvia's Restaurant of Harlem, Watkins referred to Juan Williams as "Bill O'Reilly's happy little Negro", in reference to Williams' insistence that O'Reilly did nothing wrong.

In response, Williams wrote a scathing piece about Watkins in Time. O'Reilly spent a week on his show calling for Watkins to be fired from his post at Syracuse University. Watkins referred to O'Reilly, Hannity, and Limbaugh as "The Axis of Ignorance" for what Watkins believed were racist attacks against the Black community.

Later in the spring of 2008, Watkins formed an online protest through his website YourBlackWorld.com. In response to Fox News criticism of Senator Barack Obama and Pastor Jeremiah Wright, Watkins asked his supporters to write to Bill O'Reilly's corporate sponsors and complain about O'Reilly's behavior.

Watkins' protest led O'Reilly to call for Watkins to be fired and to seek interviews with the chancellor of Syracuse University, Nancy Cantor. He also sent reporters to question Cantor and ask her why she had not challenged Watkins for his words. In his comments, O'Reilly claimed that Watkins had accused him of wanting to lynch Michelle Obama, the wife of then Senator Barack Obama, and that Watkins was "smearing the good name of Syracuse University by spreading these kinds of lies".

O'Reilly had made the following remark about Michelle Obama and lynching on February 21, 2008: "I don't want to go on a lynching party against Michelle Obama unless there's evidence, hard facts, that say this is how the woman really feels. If that's how she really feels — that America is a bad country or a flawed nation, whatever — then that's legit." He later apologized, saying, "I'm sorry if my statement offended anybody", on his February 22, 2008, program.

=== Challenge to the NCAA ===
Watkins is an advocate for the rights of college athletes. In his work as a faculty affiliate for the College Sport Research Institute at the University of North Carolina Chapel Hill, Watkins has challenged the NCAA on its refusal to compensate college athletes, stating that the NCAA exploits Black families by using young men for their athletic ability and refusing to share the wealth with their families.

In his work, Watkins has appeared on several national media outlets, including CNN, ESPN, Fox, and CBS Sports explaining why athletes should be compensated. He has also challenged the tax exempt status of the NCAA, stating that the United States Congress should step in and conduct an anti-trust investigation into the NCAA.

In op-ed pieces opposite NCAA President Myles Brand, Watkins has argued that students' rights are being violated on a regular basis by the NCAA and that a fairer compensation model should be used by the league. He cites that the revenues from NCAA March Madness exceed that of the Super Bowl and the World Series combined. Watkins also cites the fact that many coaches are made into millionaires by a system designed to keep star athletes and their families in poverty. At the conference for the North American Society for the Sociology of Sport (NASSS), Watkins cited the work of sociologist Harry Edwards during the 1968 Olympics as a springboard for Black athlete activism.

"Like hookers kept dazed on drugs, the Black athlete is kept ignorant by his coaches so they can continue to rob him blind", said Watkins. "Coaches in college are given little incentive to increase graduation rates, and even choose the classes for the athletes. It's a sham."

=== Financial activism ===
Through his former position at Syracuse University and YourBlackWorld.com, Watkins also provides regular financial advice to a largely African-American audience. He argues that African Americans should consider their financial independence to be part of their spiritual and social independence. He also argues that African Americans should find a way to "own the land on which you stand", in order to be truly liberated in the U.S.

== Controversies ==
Watkins drew controversy on Twitter after condemning Kamala Harris for marrying a white man despite having attended an HBCU, and later for making comments about singer Lizzo that were widely interpreted as fat-shaming. His investment in and advocacy of Jay Morrison proved to be a coverup of the failed Tulsa Real Estate Fund.

=== BET and Lil Wayne ===
Watkins has been highly critical of hip-hop, Black Entertainment Television and rap artist Lil Wayne. After reading the lyrics to Wayne's song, "We Be Steady Mobbin'", Watkins said that he was "ditching Lil Wayne completely" and that Wayne had "positioned himself as an enemy of the black community" who can be linked to "the holocaust occurring within the black community today". He has also said that Black Entertainment Television has an agenda similar to that of the Ku Klux Klan.

=== Adidas and the "Slave Shoes" ===
Watkins slammed the sportsgear firm Adidas for its JS Roundhouse Mid shoe created with a shackle design. In an op-ed, Watkins dubbed the design as "slave shoes". Before canceling the shoe, Adidas wrote a statement in support of the designer and the design, indicating: the shoe "is nothing more than the designer Jeremy Scott's outrageous and unique take on fashion and has nothing to do with slavery." Civil rights leader Reverend Jesse Jackson agreed with Watkins, stating: "The attempt to commercialize and make popular more than 200 years of human degradation, where blacks were considered three-fifths human by our Constitution is offensive, appalling and insensitive".

=== Russell Simmons and the war on drugs ===
Watkins joined hip-hop mogul Russell Simmons to co-author a letter urging President Barack Obama to put an end to Ronald Reagan's war on drugs. The letter acquired more than 175 signatures from celebrities, activists, business and thought leaders, and scholars. Simmons and Watkins outlined specific programs the president could enforce to put an end to the war on drugs, including supporting the Youth Prison Reduction through Opportunities, Mentoring, Intervention, Support, and Education (Youth PROMISE) Act; forming a panel to review requests for clemency that come to the Office of the Pardon Attorney; and increasing transitioning programs for released inmates. Following the release of the letter, President Obama declared an end to the war on drugs with strategies to treat addictions and diverting non-violent drug offenders into treatment instead of prisons.

=== Mountain Dew; Tyler, the Creator; and Lil Wayne ===
Watkins criticized Mountain Dew for approving what he dubbed to be "the most racist commercial in history", created by Tyler, the Creator. He also slammed the beverage company for paying rapper Lil Wayne a lucrative endorsement deal following his derogatory lyrics about civil rights icon Emmett Till. As a result of a call for the ad to be pulled and calls to be made to Clear Channel by the Mamie Till Mobley Foundation as well as a petition created by other activists and spearheaded by Reena Walker, Mountain Dew was forced to pull the series of commercials created by Tyler, the Creator and pull the plug on Lil Wayne's lucrative endorsement deal. Watkins and Tyler, the Creator engaged in an exchange of Twitter messages, in which Watkins stated he had an "altered perspective" after listening to Tyler, the Creator's music. Media outlets ran with Watkins' statement, claiming he had recanted his initial stance. Watkins later clarified the nature of his Tweet in a YouTube video, stating he does not approve of the commercial.
