= Chained to the Rhythm =

2017 single by Katy Perry

Single by Katy Perry featuring Skip Marley

from the album Witness
- Released: February 10, 2017
- Recorded: 2017
- Studio: MXM Studios (Los Angeles, California); Wolf Cousins (Stockholm, Sweden)
- Genre: Dance-pop; disco; dancehall
- Length: 3:57
- Label: Capitol
- Songwriters: Katy Perry; Max Martin; Sia Furler; Ali Payami; Skip Marley
- Producers: Max Martin; Ali Payami

Katy Perry singles chronology
"Rise" (2016)	"Chained to the Rhythm" (2017)	"Bon Appétit" (2017)

Skip Marley singles chronology
"Lions" (2017)	"Chained to the Rhythm" (2017)	"Calm Down" (2017)

Music video
- "Chained to the Rhythm" on YouTube

"Chained to the Rhythm" is a song by American singer Katy Perry from her fifth studio album, Witness (2017). It was released on February 10, 2017, through Capitol Records as the lead single from the album. The song features vocals from Jamaican singer Skip Marley. The artists co-wrote the track with its producers Max Martin and Ali Payami, with additional writing from Sia. The song was recorded at MXM Studios in Los Angeles and Wolf Cousins in Stockholm, Sweden. It is a dance-pop, disco and dancehall song, with lyrics about political awareness.

"Chained to the Rhythm" reached number one in Poland and Hungary, as well as the top five in Australia, Canada, Lebanon, the United Kingdom, and the United States, and the top 10 in Austria, Belgium, the Czech Republic, Denmark, Finland, Germany, Ireland, Italy, the Netherlands, New Zealand, Norway, Sweden, and Switzerland. It was also certified Diamond in Brazil and France as well as multi-Platinum within Australia, Canada, Finland, Italy, and Norway, and the United States.

Mathew Cullen directed the song's music video, which was released on February 21, 2017. The video features Perry in an amusement park called "Oblivia". It was nominated for three awards at the 2017 MTV Video Music Awards. Perry and Marley promoted the song with live performances at the 59th Annual Grammy Awards, the 2017 Brit Awards, and the 2017 iHeartRadio Music Awards. "Chained to the Rhythm" has also been performed on the Witness concert tour Witness: The Tour (2017–2018), and on The Lifetimes Tour (2025).

== Production and release ==
Perry described her fifth album Witness as a "360-degree liberation" record, with "Chained to the Rhythm" representing a "political liberation". The singer felt "kind of depressed" after Donald Trump was elected President of the United States in November 2016, and "definitely didn't want to write a club banger" when the "world" was "on fire". She "channeled her frustration into new music" and said creating the track "was a nice exercise of like writing a song that at first listen is a really fun song, but I guess the more you dive into it, it has a different sub-text". Skip Marley told Billboard he and Perry made the song together after she heard his track "Lions" and wanted to collaborate with him. After the two spoke in January 2017, he "delivered the message that I had to deliver" while recording the track, describing it as "one of unification and love".

On February 8, 2017, in a promotional campaign for "Chained to the Rhythm," disco balls playing the song were left in various international cities. Capitol Records released the song for download two days later as the album's lead single and onto American radio stations on February 14. The song earned over three million streams within twenty-four hours of its Spotify release, breaking the record for the highest first-day streaming for a single track by a female artist. Aya Tanimura directed an accompanying lyric video. It features a hamster inside a doll house while a pair of human hands prepares miniature food for the hamster. Erin Jansen from USA Today wrote "we're shown footage of a hamster running tirelessly on a hamster wheel, a visualization of the popular idiom meaning to perform activities repetitiously without progress." She also mentioned that, "Paired with Perry's lyrics, there's definitely a message to be absorbed."

== Composition ==
"Chained to the Rhythm"
A 23-second sample of "Chained to the Rhythm", in which Perry sings: "So comfortable we're living in a bubble/So comfortable we cannot see the trouble." Critics praised the strong political criticism present on the lyrics.

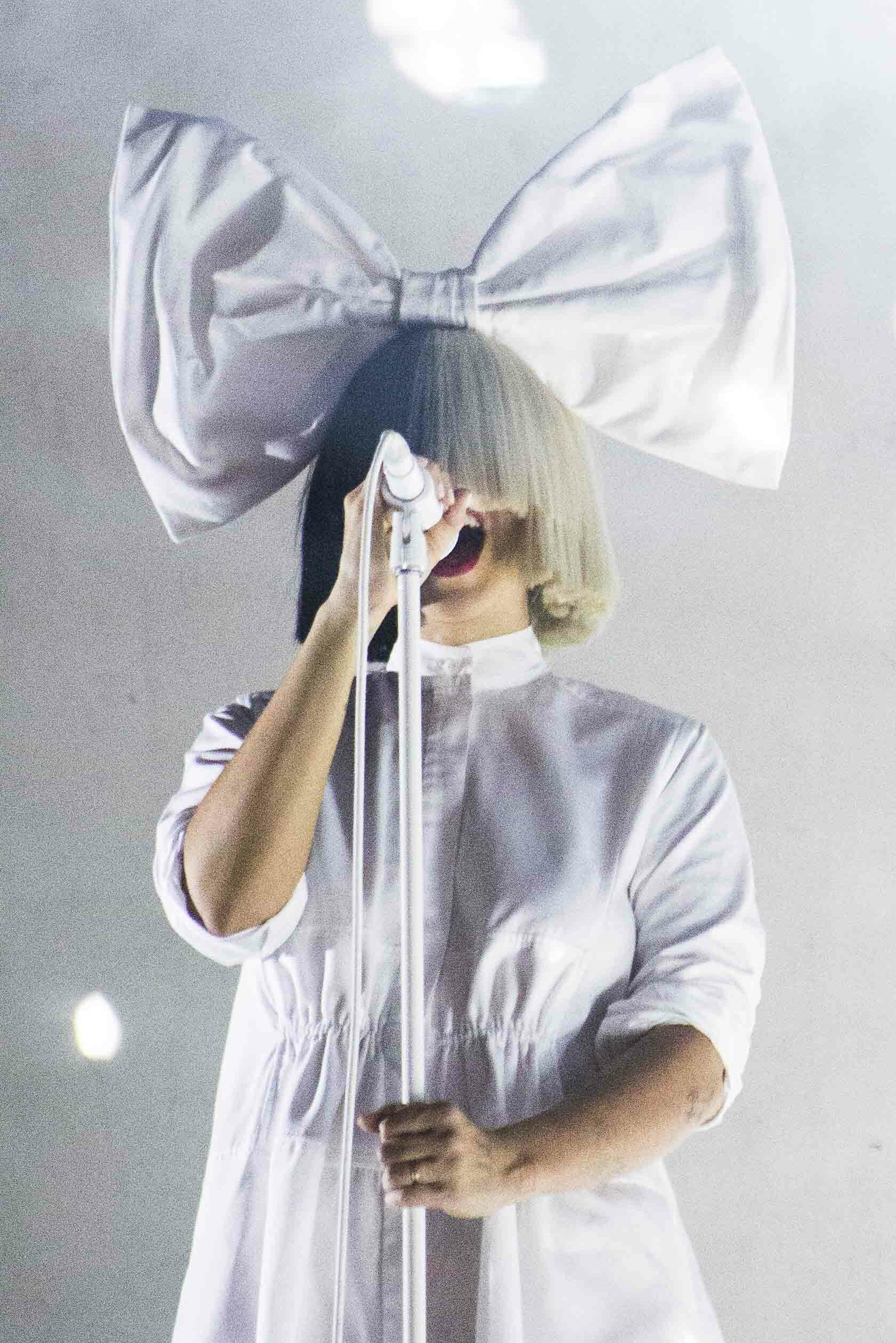
Sia (pictured) co-wrote the song with Perry and also contributed with background vocals.

"Chained to the Rhythm" is a dance-pop, disco and dancehall song that contains a midtempo beat. Perry co-wrote the track with Marley, Sia, and its producers Max Martin and Ali Payami. It has a length of three minutes and fifty-seven seconds. The song contains "slap bass" with elements of electric guitar and synths. It features a guest appearance from Marley and background vocals from Furler. According to the sheet music published by Kobalt Music Publishing America, Inc on Musicnotes.com, "Chained to the Rhythm" is in A minor set in a 4/4 time signature at a moderate tempo of 95 beats per minute. Perry's vocal range spans from the low note B_{3} to the high note G_{5}, while the music follows the chord progression of Am–G/A–Dm_{7}–F. In the chorus, Perry sings "Turn it up, it's your favorite song / Dance, dance, dance to the distortion / Turn it up, keep it on repeat / Stumbling around like a wasted zombie / Yeah, we think we're free / Drink, this one is on me / We're all chained to the rhythm, to the rhythm, to the rhythm."

According to Thomas H. Green of The Arts Desk, "Chained to the Rhythm" is "a perfect slice of pop, lightly marinated in calypso with lyrics and a melody that brilliantly muster both existential hopelessness and remaining upbeat against bad odds". Jason Newman from Rolling Stone wrote, "Perry injects a subversive element underneath the ostensibly frothy song, lacing her lyrics with ideas of selfish comfortability and complacency." Slant Magazine states, "Despite the lightweight vibe" the track is a "decidedly political statement". Lars Brandie from Billboard wrote the track "is built on a bed of warm, slightly tweaked '80s keys and has its energies tuned to the dancefloor." Nick Levine of NME also observed political criticism in the lyrics, stating they "appear to be a rallying cry for society to become more politically involved and less complacent."

== Critical reception ==
In a positive review, E!'s Samantha Scnurr wrote the song "sounds like a soon-to-be party classic with its easy pulse and disco elements, layered underneath the upbeat veneer, Perry delivers a strong message about awareness and activism—and, according to her, how it's lacking." NME reviewer Jordan Bassett praised the track as "like Daft Punk, but fun", and felt the production was "crisp-as-fuck". Writing for Vulture, Karen Brill was less favorable, questioning if the track was "pretty much just dance, without much subtext?" Another positive review came from Jason Lipshutz of Billboard, who felt it amplified "Perry's new musical agenda at a time when she needed one" with its political themes. According to him, "the single is built around lyrics chastising us for being 'happily numb' and 'tone deaf,' and tries to gently puncture the bubble that we create when we drown out the world's issues."

Sal Cinquemani from Slant Magazine praised "Chained to the Rhythm", writing, "a track with a hook that implores listeners to 'Come on, turn it up/Keep it on repeat' had better deliver the goods, and this one most definitely does." Josh Duboff from Vanity Fair considered the song "a departure from straightforward firework metaphors and nostalgic teenage romance anthems." He noted, "the idea of the song is that we are chained to the 'rhythm,' perhaps not questioning our daily lives and existences as much as we should be." MTV's Anne T. Donahue gave a positive review for the song, calling it a "hardly new terrain for Perry." She described it as a "totally fine song that's easy to listen and dance to, and one that does justice to her career in pop."

== Commercial performance ==
"Chained to the Rhythm" debuted in the top-five on Billboard's "Hot 100" charts for Canada and the United States, both some of the few charts in the world with a combination sales, streaming data and airplay. On the US Hot 100, it was the highest debuting song by a female artist since Adele's "Hello" entered at number one on November 14, 2015. It debuted at number three on Digital Songs chart with 108,000 downloads sold in its first week, number 15 on Streaming Songs with 14.7 million US streams, and rose from 35 to 20 on Radio Songs with fifty million in audience after its first full week of tracking. "Chained to the Rhythm" became Perry's 14th Hot 100 top 10, and the third-highest-debut of her 25 Hot 100 entries, only behind "Part of Me" (which debuted at number one in 2012) and "California Gurls" featuring Snoop Dogg (which debuted at number two in 2010). The track is Perry's first top 10 since "Dark Horse" featuring Juicy J. It also became Marley's first top 10 entry in the nation. The song debuted at number 20 on the Adult Pop Songs chart, where it peaked at number seven. In its fourth week, the song reached 62 million audience impressions and became her 16th top 10 entry on the Pop Songs chart, tying with Maroon 5 and Usher for the most top 10 on the chart, and her first top 10 since "Birthday" in 2014. It since reached number eight on the Pop Songs chart and number nine on the Radio Songs chart with 65 million audience impressions. As a result, "Chained to the Rhythm" became her 15th top 10 Radio Songs entry where it became her first to reach the top 10 since "Dark Horse" topped the chart in 2014. On the Billboard Dance Club Songs chart, it became her 17th consecutive number-one song in the magazine's April 22, 2017, issue, tying with Mariah Carey for the fifth most number-one entries on the chart and extending her record for most consecutive tracks to top the chart. On October 29, 2019, "Chained to the Rhythm" was certified double platinum by the Recording Industry Association of America for shipments of two million units.

On November 7, 2017, Music Canada certified the track double platinum for shipments of 160,000 units. "Chained to the Rhythm" also became Perry's 14th top 10 entry in the United Kingdom, where it debuted at number seven on the UK Singles Chart. The following week, it rose to number five in the nation after her performance at the 2017 Brit Awards. On November 17, 2017, the British Phonographic Industry certified the song Platinum for shipments of 600,000 units. In Australia, the song reached number four on the ARIA Charts, and certified double platinum by the Australian Recording Industry Association for shipments of 140,000 units. In Russia, "Chained to the Rhythm" debuted at number 4 on Top Hit Weekly General. It peaked at number two with overall 955,608 plays, became Perry's only second song to reach it.

== Music video ==
A screenshot from the music video that shows the fictional gas station. According to BBC editor Mark Savage, the liquid name is "a reference to the West's dependency on oil, but also to the looming crisis over the world's water supply, which some experts believe could lead to a war in Asia".

On February 18, 2017, Perry released a preview of the music video on her alter ego Kathy Beth Terry's Twitter account. On February 21, 2017, she released the official music video on Vevo, with Mathew Cullen as director. The video was mostly shot at the Six Flags Magic Mountain theme park in Valencia, Santa Clarita, California, where Perry rides a stylised version of the Full Throttle roller coaster.

The video is set in a futuristic theme park called "Oblivia". BBC's Mark Savage noted the theme is a metaphor for the infinite distractions of modern society. Billboard writer Gil Kaufman wrote that the video has "a number of not-so-subtle hints at Perry's feelings about the current political climate in the nation." The video opens with Perry walking through the gates of the theme park, where she stares at her surroundings in fascination. In the video, the guests are crowding around a sign for "the greatest ride in the universe." Perry is awestruck until she pricks her finger on a rose stem made of barbed wire. The Atomium, which is the Belgian national symbol, can be seen in the first two seconds of the music video. Some of the attractions contain references to the Brighton Palace Pier in the United Kingdom. The giant concrete dome in the park is supposedly a reference to the San Onofre nuclear power plant located on the Pacific coast.

The next scene shows Perry riding a roller coaster. Savage says that the actual roller coaster is called Full Throttle, which has the tallest loop in North America. The scene changes to "The Great American Dream Drop", where a young couple snuggles in a tiny house that gets flung high into the air and then plunges into the ground.

The next scene is a gas station, where men in sailor costumes whisk Perry off her feet. It shows people drinking large beakers of flaming "Inferno H_{2}O", a bright blue, tainted liquid that makes patrons belch. A hamster wheel attraction then appears, with signs guiding guests to it. Near the end, while watching a 3D movie, Perry notices a homogeneity among the guests. She finds herself in a giant dance number after Skip Marley emerges from a 3D movie for his cameo. Afterward, Perry sings a panicked final chorus, trapped in the middle of a mindless dance routine. This leads to the final shot of the video, where her worried face stares into the camera.

== Live performances and covers ==
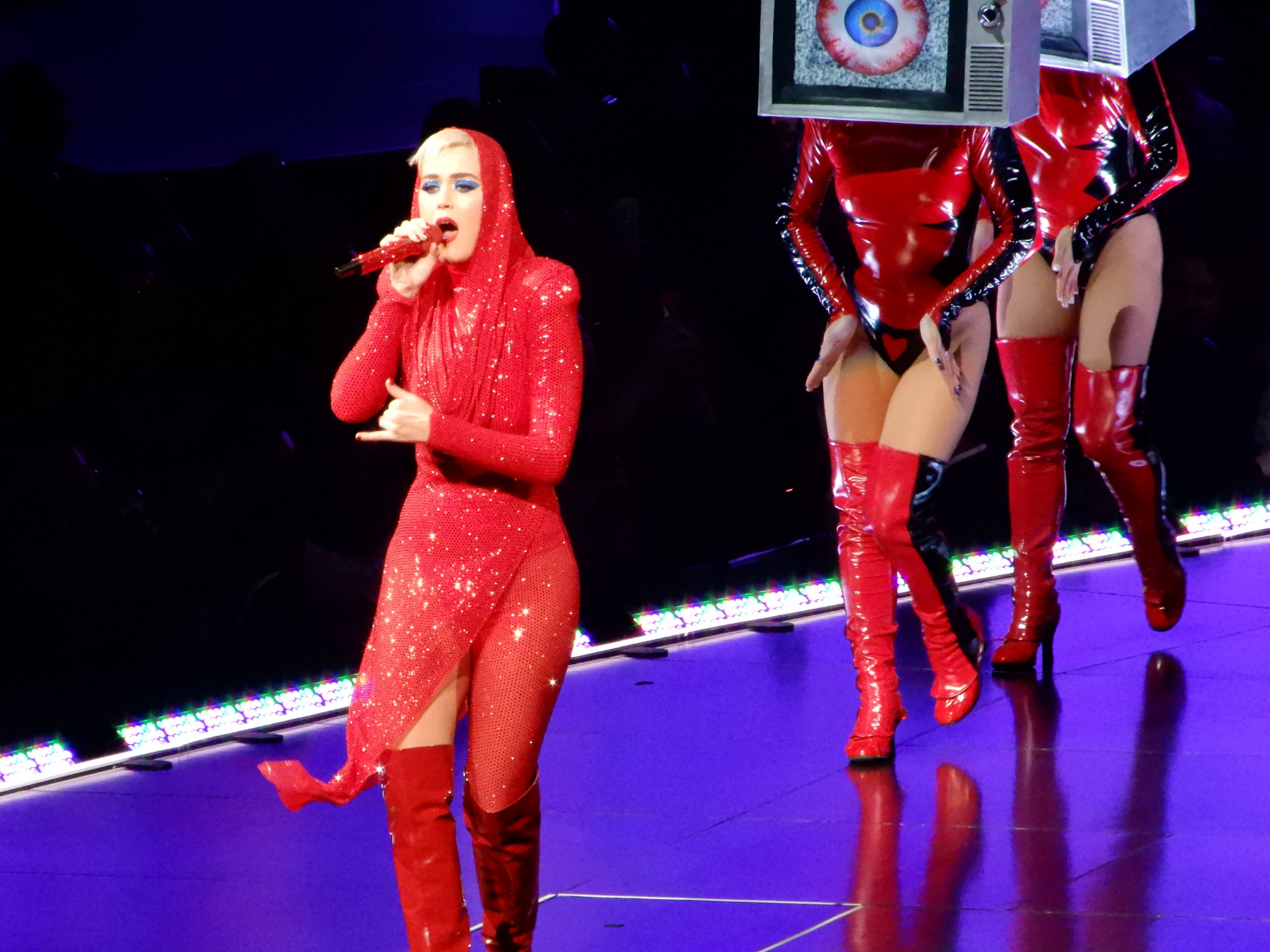
Perry performing "Chained to the Rhythm" during Witness: The Tour in Madison Square Garden

Perry first sang the track live at the 59th Annual Grammy Awards on February 12, 2017, where she finished by standing in front of the United States Constitution alongside Skip Marley and closed with the message "No hate". Ralsa Bruner from Time felt she made "a bold political statement" with her performance. Billboard editor Jenna Romaine also observed political elements, writing that "it was impossible not to notice its heavily symbolic nature".

Perry and Marley performed the track again at the 2017 Brit Awards on February 22, alongside two giant puppet skeletons. Writing for The Hollywood Reporter, Meena Jang observed that viewers believed the skeletons resembled Donald Trump and Theresa May, and called the performance "politically charged". Adam Boult of The Daily Telegraph also suspected the skeletons resembled Trump and May, though wrote that "The point of the stage dressing might not have been entirely clear – and Perry refrained from saying anything overtly political".

Perry and Marley also sang it at the 2017 iHeartRadio Music Awards on March 5, where children surrounded her during the performance and she placed herself in a giant hamster wheel. Teen Vogue contributor Sophie Hirsh surmised it contained "a metaphor for breaking free from the hamster wheel–esque grind". Lexy Perez of The Hollywood Reporter observed that Perry "appeared to make another political statement" with the performance. Perry herself joked afterwards that it had "a giant orange hamster on the wheel of life". In February 2017, Vant delivered a punk version at BBC Radio 1's Live Lounge.

== Accolades ==
=== Awards and nominations ===
Name of award, year listed, category, and result
Award	Year	Category	Result	Ref.
Los 40 Music Awards	2017	International Video of the Year	Nominated	
MTV Video Music Awards	2017	Best Pop Video	Nominated	
MTV Video Music Awards	2017	Best Direction	Nominated	
MTV Video Music Awards	2017	Best Visual Effects	Nominated	
Vevo Certified Awards	2017	Vevo Certified Award	Won	
BMI Pop Awards	2018	Award Winning Song (Note: Skip Marley, one of the songwriters, received the award.)	Won	
Webby Awards	2018	People's Voice Award for Music (Social) (Note: The disco ball campaign won the award.)	Won	
APRA Awards	2020	The Billion List Award (Note: Sia, one of the songwriters, received the award.)	Won	

=== Critic rankings and listicles ===
Name of publication, year listed, name of listicle, and result
Publication	Year	Listicle	Result	Ref.
Billboard	2017	Best Songs of the Year: Mid-Year Staff Picks	40th	
NME	2017	Best Songs of the Year	17th	
Seventeen	2017	Best Songs of the Year	Placed	
ShortList	2017	Best Songs of the Year	23rd	
Slant Magazine	2017	Best Music Videos of the Year	22nd	
Stereogum	2017	Favorite Songs of the Year	Placed	
Stereogum	2017	Best Pop Songs of the Year	40th	
Slant Magazine	2020	Best Music Videos of the 2010s	95th	

== Formats and track listings ==
- Digital download
1. "Chained to the Rhythm" (featuring Skip Marley) – 3:57
- Digital download (Hot Chip Remix)
1. "Chained to the Rhythm" (Hot Chip Remix) – 5:42
- Digital download (Oliver Heldens Remix)
1. "Chained to the Rhythm" (Oliver Heldens Remix) – 4:37
- Digital download (Lil Yachty Remix)
1. "Chained to the Rhythm" (featuring Lil Yachty) – 4:11
- CD single
1. "Chained to the Rhythm" (featuring Skip Marley) – 3:58
2. "Chained to the Rhythm" (Instrumental) – 3:57

== Credits and personnel ==
=== Recording locations ===
- Recorded at MXM Studios (Los Angeles, California) and Wolf Cousins Studios (Stockholm, Sweden)
- Mixed at MixStar Studios (Virginia Beach, Virginia)
- Mastered at Sterling Sound (New York City)

=== Management ===
- When I'm Rich You'll Be My Bitch (ASCAP) – administered by WB Music Corp. –, MXM – administered by Kobalt – (ASCAP), Pineapple Lasgane/Sony/ATV Music Publishing Ltd. on behalf of Warner/Chappell Music Scandinavia AB and Wolf Cousins (ASCAP), and Levi Sky LLC (Blue Mountain Music Ltd.) (BMI)
- Skip Marley appears courtesy of Island Records

=== Personnel ===
- Katy Perry – songwriter, lead vocals, background vocals
- Skip Marley – songwriter, featured vocals, background vocals
- Max Martin – songwriter, producer for MXM Productions, background vocals, programming, Prophet 6, Solina
- Ali Payami – songwriter, producer for Wolf Cousins Productions, programming, drum, bass guitar, synths, piano, epic claps, percussion
- Sia – songwriter, background vocals
- Peter Karlsson – vocal editing, percussion
- Alan Ghaleb – funky guitar
- Serban Ghenea – mixing
- John Hanes – mixing engineering
- Sam Holland – engineering
- Cory Bice – engineering assistant
- Jeremy Lertola – engineering assistant
- Tom Coyne – mastering

Credits and personnel adapted from Witness album liner notes.

== Charts ==
=== Weekly charts ===
2017 Weekly chart performance for "Chained to the Rhythm"
Chart (2017)	Peak position
Argentina (Monitor Latino)	8
Australia (ARIA)	4
Austria (Ö3 Austria Top 40)	7
Belarus Airplay (Eurofest)	2
Belgium (Ultratop 50 Flanders)	6
Belgium (Ultratop 50 Wallonia)	5
Brazil (Billboard Hot 100)	4
Bulgaria Airplay (PROPHON)	3
Canada Hot 100 (Billboard)	3
Canada AC (Billboard)	2
Canada CHR/Top 40 (Billboard)	5
Canada Hot AC (Billboard)	2
CIS Airplay (TopHit)	4
Colombia (National-Report)	57
Croatia International Airplay (Top lista)	3
Czech Republic Airplay (ČNS IFPI)	2
Czech Republic Singles Digital (ČNS IFPI)	6
Denmark (Tracklisten)	10
Ecuador (National-Report)	24
Finland (Suomen virallinen lista)	8
Finnish Airplay (Radiosoittolista)	1
France (SNEP)	20
Germany (GfK)	6
Greece Digital (Billboard)	3
Hungary (Rádiós Top 40)	1
Hungary (Single Top 40)	5
Ireland (IRMA)	6
Israel International Airplay (Media Forest)	2
Italy (FIMI)	10
Japan Hot 100 (Billboard)	31
Lebanon (Lebanese Top 20)	3
Luxembourg Digital (Billboard)	8
Malaysia (RIM)	14
Mexico (Billboard Mexican Airplay)	17
Netherlands (Dutch Top 40)	6
Netherlands (Single Top 100)	14
New Zealand (Recorded Music NZ)	8
Norway (VG-lista)	8
Paraguay (Monitor Latino)	13
Poland Airplay (ZPAV)	1
Portugal (AFP)	16
Romania (Media Forest)	2
Russia Airplay (TopHit)	4
Scottish Singles Sales (Official Charts)	3
Slovakia Airplay (ČNS IFPI)	6
Slovakia Singles Digital (ČNS IFPI)	5
Slovenia (SloTop50)	3
Spain (Promusicae)	16
Sweden (Sverigetopplistan)	9
Switzerland (Schweizer Hitparade)	6
UK Singles (Official Charts)	5
Ukraine Airplay (TopHit)	6
Ukraine Airplay (TopHit) Oliver Heldens Remix	97
US Billboard Hot 100	4
US Adult Contemporary (Billboard)	17
US Adult Pop Airplay (Billboard)	7
US Dance Club Songs (Billboard)	1
US Dance Airplay (Billboard)	6
US Pop Airplay (Billboard)	8
US Rhythmic Airplay (Billboard)	32
Venezuela (National-Report)	58
Venezuela English (Record Report)	4

2018 Weekly chart performance for "Chained to the Rhythm"
Chart (2018)	Peak position
CIS Airplay (TopHit)	109
Russia Airplay (TopHit)	117
Ukraine Airplay (TopHit)	48

2019 Weekly chart performance for "Chained to the Rhythm"
Chart (2019)	Peak position
Ukraine Airplay (TopHit)	76

2023 Weekly chart performance for "Chained to the Rhythm"
Chart (2023)	Peak position
Belarus Airplay (TopHit)	151
Estonia Airplay (TopHit)	126

2017 Weekly chart performance for "Chained to the Rhythm" (Lil Yachty Remix)
Chart (2017)	Peak position
CIS Airplay (TopHit)	184
Ukraine Airplay (TopHit)	9

2018 Weekly chart performance for "Chained to the Rhythm" (Lil Yachty Remix)
Chart (2018)	Peak position
Ukraine Airplay (TopHit)	137

2019 Weekly chart performance for "Chained to the Rhythm" (Lil Yachty Remix)
Chart (2019)	Peak position
Ukraine Airplay (TopHit)	180

=== Monthly charts ===
2017 Monthly chart performance for "Chained to the Rhythm"
Chart (2017)	Peak position
CIS Airplay (TopHit)	7
Russia Airplay (TopHit)	8
Ukraine Airplay (TopHit)	10

2018 Monthly chart performance for "Chained to the Rhythm"
Chart (2018)	Peak position
Ukraine Airplay (TopHit)	65

2019 Monthly chart performance for "Chained to the Rhythm"
Chart (2019)	Peak position
Ukraine Airplay (TopHit)	81

2017 Monthly chart performance for "Chained to the Rhythm" (Lil Yachty Remix)
Chart (2017)	Peak position
Ukraine Airplay (TopHit)	6

=== Year-end charts ===
2017 year-end chart performance for "Chained to the Rhythm"
Chart (2017)	Position
Argentina (Monitor Latino)	28
Australia (ARIA)	84
Austria (Ö3 Austria Top 40)	69
Belgium (Ultratop Flanders)	36
Belgium (Ultratop Wallonia)	16
Brazil (Pro-Música Brasil)	94
Bolivia (Monitor Latino)	95
Canada (Canadian Hot 100)	34
CIS (TopHit)	25
Croatia International Airplay (Top lista)	7
Denmark (Tracklisten)	77
Germany (Official German Charts)	64
Guatemala (Monitor Latino)	78
Hungary (Rádiós Top 40)	2
Hungary (Single Top 40)	14
Hungary (Stream Top 40)	42
Iceland (Tónlistinn)	7
Israel International Airplay (Media Forest)	17
Italy (FIMI)	68
Latvia Airplay (LaIPA)	5
Netherlands (Dutch Top 40)	41
Netherlands (Single Top 100)	90
Panama (Monitor Latino)	77
Paraguay (Monitor Latino)	43
Poland (ZPAV)	5
Portugal (AFP)	69
Romania (Airplay 100)	28
Russia Airplay (TopHit)	36
Slovenia (SloTop50)	17
Spain (PROMUSICAE)	80
Sweden (Sverigetopplistan)	72
Switzerland (Schweizer Hitparade)	32
Ukraine Airplay (TopHit)	29
Ukraine Airplay (TopHit) Lil Yachty Remix	128
UK Singles (OCC)	49
Uruguay (Monitor Latino)	96
US Billboard Hot 100	73
US Adult Contemporary (Billboard)	41
US Adult Top 40 (Billboard)	31
US Dance Club Songs (Billboard)	16
US Mainstream Top 40 (Billboard)	44

2018 year-end chart performance for "Chained to the Rhythm"
Chart (2018)	Position
CIS (TopHit)	136
Hungary (Rádiós Top 40)	27
Iceland (Plötutíóindi)	88
Ukraine Airplay (TopHit)	80
Ukraine Airplay (TopHit) Lil Yachty Remix	165

2022 year-end chart performance for "Chained to the Rhythm"
Chart (2022)	Position
Hungary (Rádiós Top 40)	46

2023 year-end chart performance for "Chained to the Rhythm"
Chart (2023)	Position
Estonia Airplay (TopHit)	186
Hungary (Rádiós Top 40)	70

=== Decade-end charts ===
2010s decade-end chart performance for "Chained to the Rhythm"
Chart (2010–2019)	Position
Ukraine Airplay (TopHit)	95

== Certifications and sales ==
Certifications and sales for "Chained to the Rhythm"
Region	Certification	Certified units/sales
Australia (ARIA)	4× Platinum	280,000^{‡}
Austria (IFPI Austria)	Gold	15,000^{‡}
Belgium (BRMA)	Gold	10,000^{‡}
Brazil (Pro-Música Brasil)	Diamond	250,000^{‡}
Canada (Music Canada)	3× Platinum	240,000^{‡}
Denmark (IFPI Danmark)	Platinum	90,000^{‡}
Finland	3× Platinum	12,000
France (SNEP)	Diamond	333,333^{‡}
Germany (BVMI)	Platinum	400,000^{‡}
Italy (FIMI)	2× Platinum	100,000^{‡}
New Zealand (RMNZ)	Platinum	30,000^{‡}
Norway (IFPI Norway)	2× Platinum	120,000^{‡}
Poland (ZPAV)	Platinum	50,000^{‡}
Portugal (AFP)	Platinum	10,000^{‡}
South Korea	—	4,678 (Note: South Korea first-week sales figures.)
Spain (Promusicae)	Platinum	40,000^{‡}
United Kingdom (BPI)	Platinum	600,000^{‡}
United States (RIAA)	2× Platinum	2,000,000^{‡}
Streaming
Sweden (GLF)	Platinum	8,000,000^{†}
^{‡} Sales+streaming figures based on certification alone.^{†} Streaming-only figures based on certification alone.

== Release history ==
Release dates and formats for "Chained to the Rhythm"
Region	Date	Format(s)	Version	Label	Ref.
Various	February 10, 2017	Digital download; streaming	Original	Capitol	
Italy	February 10, 2017	Radio airplay	Original	Universal	
United States	February 14, 2017	Contemporary hit radio	Original	Capitol	
Various	March 17, 2017	Digital download; streaming	Hot Chip remix	Capitol	
Various	March 24, 2017	Digital download; streaming	Oliver Heldens remix	Capitol	
Various	April 11, 2017	Digital download; streaming	Remix featuring Lil Yachty	Capitol	

== See also ==
- List of Billboard Dance Club Songs number ones of 2017
