= Mountain Dew goat commercials =

2013 series of three television commercials

Felicia the Goat
- Screenshot from the third commercial showing Felicia the Goat in a police lineup
- Client: PepsiCo
- Language: English
- Product: Mountain Dew
- Release date: 2013
- Starring: Tyler, the Creator
- Country: United States

The Mountain Dew goat commercials were a series of three television commercials for the soft drink Mountain Dew, which is produced by PepsiCo. The commercials aired in 2013 and featured Tyler, the Creator, who voiced a goat named Felicia. The commercials were pulled after receiving backlash from critics, including social commentator Boyce Watkins, who stated that the commercials played to racial stereotypes regarding African Americans and trivialized violence against women.

== The ads ==
The ad campaign consisted of three commercials starring Felicia the Goat, an English-speaking goat voiced by American rapper Tyler, the Creator. In the first commercial, Felicia assaults a waitress at a restaurant after being told that the restaurant is out of Mountain Dew. In the second commercial, Felicia flees from a police officer who suspects the goat of a "DewUI" (a play on words of both DUI and Mountain Dew's slogan "Do the Dew"). In the third commercial, Felicia is part of a police lineup with five African-American men (including one played by Left Brain, a member of Tyler's musical collective Odd Future). The waitress from the first commercial, who is shown bruised, is trying to select from the lineup while Felicia interrupts by making threatening comments to the waitress (including "better not snitch on a player" and "snitches get stitches") to the point to the traumatized waitress breaks downs and runs out of the police station.

== Response ==
The final commercial, which was directed by Tyler under his pseudonym of Wolf Haley, premiered in April 2013. On May 1, social commentator and political analyst Boyce Watkins wrote a post for YourBlackWorld.net titled "Mountain Dew Releases Arguably the Most Racist Commercial in History" wherein he criticized the commercial and accused Mountain Dew of engaging in "corporate racism" with its use of stereotypes of African Americans in the commercial. Additional criticism came from the commercials' trivialization of violence against women, with an article in The Wall Street Journal pointing to a threat Felicia made to the waitress ("I'ma get out of here and I'ma do you up.") as being a threat of sexual assault used as a play on words for Mountain Dew's slogan. Following the publishing of this post, PepsiCo released a statement to MTV News saying that they were pulling the commercials: "We apologize for this video and take full responsibility. We have removed it from all Mountain Dew channels and Tyler is removing it from his channels as well." In another statement, PepsiCo said, "We understand how this video could be perceived by some as offensive, and we apologize to those who were offended." In contrast, journalist LZ Granderson wrote an opinion piece for CNN defending the commercial as "frat-boy humor" and compares the jokes made in them to those in absurdist comedy shows such as Chappelle's Show. Shortly after the ads were pulled, Tyler's manager Christian Clancy released a statement offering his apologies to people who were offended by the commercials and defending Tyler, stating that while the ads were intentionally boundary-pushing, it was not their intent to be racist.

On May 2, Billboard interviewed both Tyler and Clancy about the controversy, with Tyler defending the commercials and arguing that they were not racist. Additionally, in a Twitter post, Tyler offered to speak to Watkins about the commercials, with Watkins later stating that, while Tyler was probably well-intentioned with the advertisements, he stood by his previous criticisms of them. Clancy also deferred several questions to Mountain Dew, including an unreleased fourth commercial and how the business deal between Mountain Dew and Tyler began.

Tyler, the Creator, who voiced the goat, uses @feliciathegoat as his Instagram handle, referencing the commercials.

== See also ==
- 2013 in American television
- Live for Now (Pepsi)
