= Skip Marley =

Jamaican singer (born 1996)

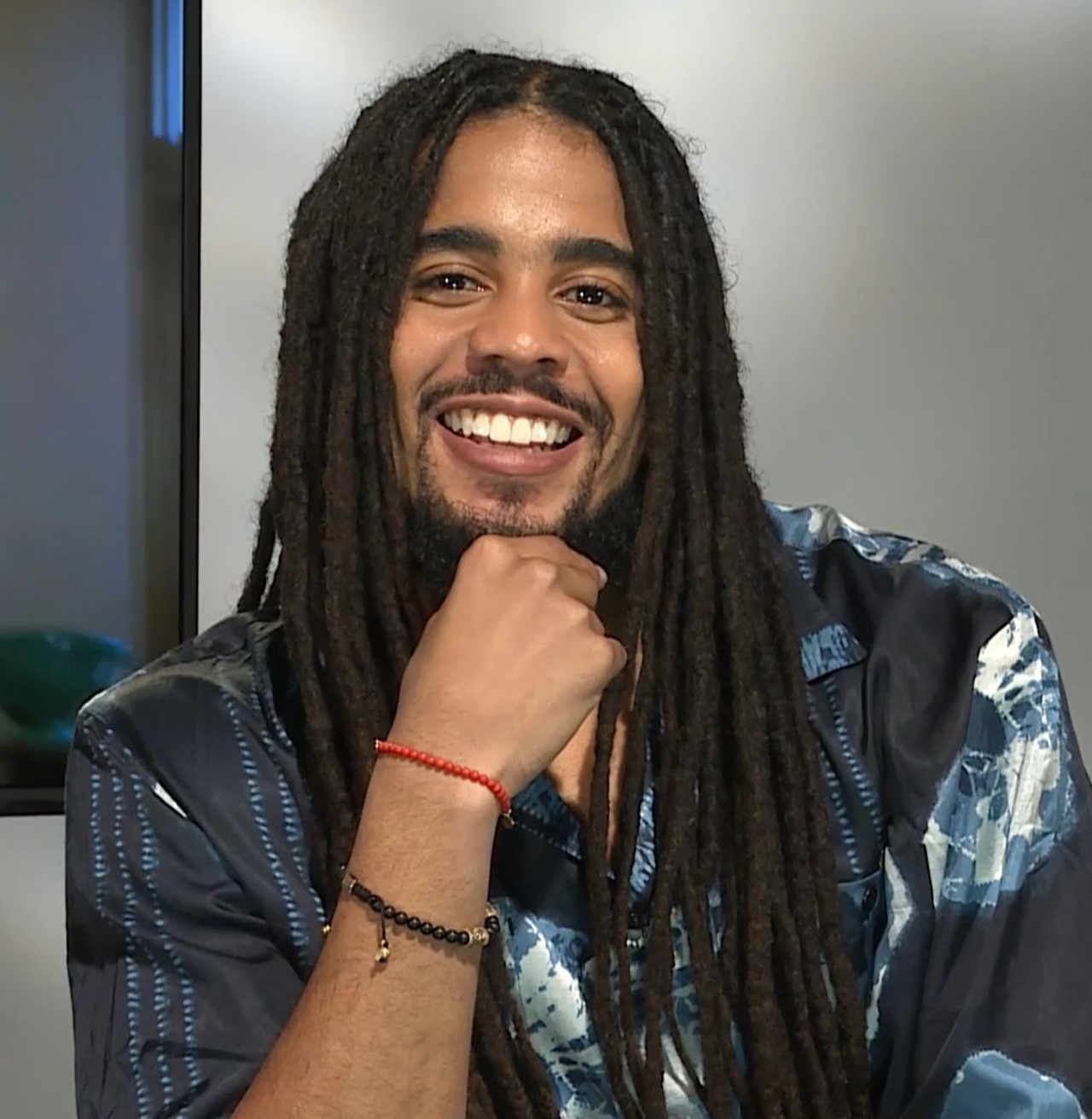
- Marley in 2022

Background information
- Born: Skip Marley Minto; 4 June 1996 (age 30); Kingston, Jamaica
- Genres: Reggae; pop; hip hop; rock
- Occupations: Singer; songwriter
- Years active: 2015–present
- Labels: Island; Tuff Gong
- Website: skipmarley.com

Skip Marley Minto (born 4 June 1996) is a Jamaican singer. He is the son of David Minto and Cedella Marley. He has received two Grammy Award nominations and an MTV Video Music Award nomination.

Skip, raised in Miami, demonstrated an early passion for music. He is self-taught in piano, drums, guitar, and bass. He embarked on his music career in 2015 with the release of singles "Cry to Me" and "Life" under the Tuff Gong label. He gained further exposure by touring with his uncles Damian and Stephen Marley on their Catch a Fire tour.

In 2016, Skip's visibility increased as he was featured in a Gap 1969 Denim campaign, and by 2017, he had signed with Island Records, releasing "Lions", a single that gained notoriety for its use in a Pepsi commercial. His collaboration with Katy Perry on "Chained to the Rhythm" led to performances at the Grammy Awards, Brit Awards, and iHeartRadio Music Awards in 2017. Marley's debut EP, "Higher Place", was released in 2020. The EP includes hits such as "Slow Down", featuring H.E.R., which has received critical acclaim and a Grammy nomination.

== Life and career ==
Skip Marley was born in Kingston, Jamaica, to Cedella Marley and David Minto, and raised in Miami, Florida. He shares his birthday with his uncle Julian Marley. Growing up, he taught himself to play the piano, drums, guitar, and bass.

In 2015, he released his first single, "Cry to Me", and a second single called "Life" under the Tuff Gong label. He later signed with Blue Mountain Music, and joined his uncles Damian and Stephen on their Catch a Fire tour.

In early 2016, he was featured in a Gap 1969 Denim campaign.

In early 2017, Skip signed to Island Records. Marley released his debut single under Island Records, "Lions", in February 2017, which was produced by Ilya Salmanzadeh. "Lions" was later used in the infamous Pepsi short film commercial, Live for Now. He is featured on, and co-wrote, Katy Perry's 2017 single "Chained to the Rhythm". The two performed the song at the 59th Annual Grammy Awards on 12 February 2017 and also at the 2017 Brit Awards on 22 February. They also performed at the 2017 iHeartRadio Music Awards on 5 March. Marley released the single "Calm Down" on 28 April 2017. In 2020, Marley was joined by students of the School of Rock to cover Bob Marley's "Three Little Birds", during the COVID-19 pandemic. On 28 August, Skip released his debut extended play (EP), Higher Place. It includes the previously released singles, "Slow Down", "No Love", and "Make Me Feel", featuring Rick Ross and Ari Lennox.

== Discography ==
=== EPs ===
Title	Details
Higher Place	Released: 28 August 2020; Label: Island Records; Format: Digital download, streaming

=== Singles ===
==== As lead artist ====
Title	Year	Peak chart positions	Certifications	Album
Title	Year	US Reggae Digital	Certifications	Album
"Cry to Me"	2015	—		Non-album singles
"Life"	2015	—		Non-album singles
"Lions"	2017	2		Non-album singles
"Calm Down"	2017	11		Non-album singles
"Refugee"	2017	—		Non-album singles
"Cruel World" (with Seeb)	2017	—		Non-album singles
"That's Not True" (featuring Damian Marley)	2019	—		Higher Place
"Enemy"	2019	—		Non-album single
"Slow Down" (with H.E.R.)	2019	—	RIAA: Gold	Higher Place
"No Love"	2020	—		Higher Place
"Make Me Feel"(featuring Rick Ross and Ari Lennox)	2020	—		Higher Place
"Jane" (with Ayra Starr)	2022	—		Non-album single
"Close"	2024	—		Non-album single
"—" denotes items which were not released in that country or failed to chart.

==== As featured artist ====
List of singles as featured artist, with selected chart positions and certifications, showing year released and album name
Title	Year	Peak chart positions										Sales	Certifications	Album
Title	Year	US	AUS	AUT	CAN	FRA	GER	ITA	NZ	SWI	UK	Sales	Certifications	Album
"Chained to the Rhythm" (Katy Perry featuring Skip Marley)	2017	4	4	7	3	7	6	10	8	6	5	CAN: 80,000; US: 1,000,000 (Note: United States sales figures for "Chained to the Rhythm" as of February 2017.)	ARIA: 4× Platinum; BPI: Platinum; BVMI: Platinum; FIMI: 2× Platinum; MC: 3× Platinum; RIAA: 2× Platinum; RMNZ: Gold; SNEP: Platinum	Witness
"Can't Take It from Me" (Major Lazer featuring Skip Marley)	2019	—	—	—	—	—	—	—	—	—	—			Music Is the Weapon
"All I Am" (Zhavia featuring Skip Marley)	2019	—	—	—	—	—	—	—	—	—	—			17
"Cause a Commotion" (Bugzy Malone featuring Skip Marley)	2020	—	—	—	—	—	—	—	—	—	89			TBA
"—" denotes items which were not released in that country or failed to chart.

== Awards and nominations ==
Grammy Awards

Year	Nominee / work	Award	Result
2021	"Slow Down" (with H.E.R.)	Best R&B Song	Nominated
2021	Higher Place	Best Reggae Album	Nominated

NAACP Image Awards

Year	Nominee / work	Award	Result
2021	Skip Marley	Outstanding New Artist	Nominated
2025	Skip Marley	Outstanding International Song ("Close")	Nominated

Soul Train Music Awards

Year	Nominee / work	Award	Result
2020	"Slow Down" (with H.E.R.)	Best Collaboration	Nominated
2020	"Slow Down" (with H.E.R.)	Video of The Year	Nominated

BMI Awards

Year	Nominee / work	Award	Result
2018	"Chained to the Rhythm" (with Katy Perry)	Award-winning songs	Won

MTV Video Music Awards

Year	Nominee / work	Award	Result
2017	"Chained to the Rhythm" (with Katy Perry)	Best Pop Video	Nominated
