= Juvenile Justice and Delinquency Prevention Act =

Juvenile Justice and Delinquency Prevention Act of 1974
- Long title: An Act to provide a comprehensive, coordinated approach to the problems of juvenile delinquency, and for other purposes.
- Acronyms (colloquial): JJDPA
- Enacted by: the 93rd United States Congress
- Effective: September 7, 1974

Citations
- Public law: 93-415
- Statutes at Large: 88 Stat. 1109

Codification
- Titles amended: 42 U.S.C. § 5601 et seq.

Legislative history
- Introduced in the United States Senate as S. 821 by Birch Bayh (D–IN) on February 8, 1973; Passed the Senate on July 25, 1974 (88-1); Passed the House as the Juvenile Delinquency Prevention Act on July 31, 1974 (329-20) with amendment; Senate agreed to House amendment on August 19, 1974 ((S. Rept. 93-1103)); Signed into law by President Gerald Ford on September 7, 1974

Major amendments
- Juvenile Justice Reform Act of 2018; 21st Century Department of Justice Appropriations Authorization Act

The Juvenile Justice and Delinquency Prevention Act of 1974 (JJDPA) is a United States federal law providing formula grants to states that follow a series of federal protections on the care and treatment of youth in the juvenile justice and criminal justice systems.

== Summary of provisions ==
The JJDPA, as amended, contains four "core protections" or "core mandates" for youth:

- "Deinstitutionalization/Deincarceration of Status Offenders" (DSO) — Generally prohibits the detention of status offenders and non-offenders (i.e., youth who are runaways, truants or curfew violators) in juvenile detention or adult jails. A controversial exception is the "valid court order" (VCO) exception, which permits juveniles to be detained for status offenses if they have violated a prior valid court order pertaining to the status offense. Some advocates have pressed for this exception to be repealed; the 2018 legislation that amended and reauthorized the JJDPA maintained the exception, but impose strict limitations on when and how it may be used, including a limit of seven days of detention under the VCO and a requirement that the court issue a specific written order for a VCO-related detention setting forth the factual basis supporting it.
- "Sight and Sound Separation" — Disallows contact between juvenile and adult offenders. The 2018 reauthorization and amendment legislation added a new requirement (to be phased in over three years) extending the sight-and-sound separation requirement to youth awaiting trial as adults.
- "Jail Removal" — Prohibits placement of youth in adult jails and lockups, except under very limited circumstances.
- "Racial and Ethnic Disparities" (RED) (called "Disproportionate Minority Confinement" (DMC) from 1992 to 2002, and then "Disproportionate Minority Contact" from 2002 until 2018) -- Requires states to address the issue of over-representation of youth of color in the justice system. Before 2018, the JJDPA directed states to address disparities, but provided no specifics; the 2018 reauthorization legislation provided more detailed requirements for states, including a mandate to develop and implement a data-driven "work plan with measurable objectives" to address RED.

The JJDPA created the Office of Juvenile Justice and Delinquency Prevention (OJJDP) within the United States Department of Justice as the "lead agency for juvenile justice" to supervise the implementation of the JJDPA.

== Legislative history and reauthorizations ==
Enacted in 1974, the original JJDPA (Pub. L. 93-415) was the first comprehensive federal juvenile justice legislation enacted in the United States. The "DSO" and "sight and sound" protections were part of the original law in 1974.

Congress reauthorized the JJDPA in 1977, 1980, 1984, and 1988. The 1980 reauthorization legislation added the "valid court order" exception to the DSO requirement and also enacted the jail removal requirement, in response to research on the negative outcomes for youth incarcerated in adult facilities, including high suicide rates; frequent physical, mental, and sexual assault by adult inmates and staff; inadequate educational, recreation, and vocational programming; negative labeling and self-images; and contact with serious offenders or mentally disturbed inmates.

The "DMC" requirement was added in the JJDPA in the 1992 amendments to the Act, the Juvenile Justice and Delinquency Prevention Reauthorization Act of 1992 (Pub. L. 93-415). The 1992 reauthorization also established new requirements for states to identify and address gender bias.

The bill was again reauthorized in 2002, as the Juvenile Justice and Delinquency Prevention Act of 2002, enacted as Title II, Subtitle B, of the 21st Century Department of Justice Appropriations Authorization Act (Pub. L. 107-273). The 2002 legislation extended the various JJDPA grant programs through fiscal year 2007 (for some programs) or fiscal year 2008 (for others). This was the last authorization in many years. Bills to reauthorize and reform the juvenile delinquency prevention programs of the JJDPA were repeatedly introduced by Senators Patrick Leahy, Charles Grassley and Sheldon Whitehouse, but did not receive floor votes in the Senate. After the authorization expired, Congress continued to make appropriations for particular JJDPA grants and activities, but only on a sporadic basis.

A re-authorization bill, the Juvenile Justice Reform Act of 2018 (Pub. L. 115-385) was enacted in December 2018, marking the first reauthorization since 2002. addition to reauthorizing core parts of the existing JJDPA, the 2018 bill made several significant changes to juvenile justice law. A summary of the 2018 act prepared by the Annie E. Casey Foundation noted that the act incorporates key provisions of the Youth PROMISE Act, including funding for community-based prevention, intervention, and treatment programs for youth at risk of delinquency; requires states applying for federal funding to submit a three-year plan about age-appropriate treatments of adolescents in light of "scientific knowledge about adolescent brain development and behavior"; and includes statistical-collection mandates that require OJJDP and the states to report data on "the use of restraints and isolation; youth who have other disabilities in addition to learning disabilities; status offense charges filed and youth securely confined based on status offenses; living arrangements of youth returning from custody; school-based offenses; pregnant youth in custody; and child abuse and neglect reports related to youth entering the juvenile system." A separate criminal justice bill, the FIRST STEP Act, was signed into law the same day; that Act significantly restricts the use of solitary confinement on youth detained in federal facilities, but does not apply to state facilities.

== State participation and non-participation ==
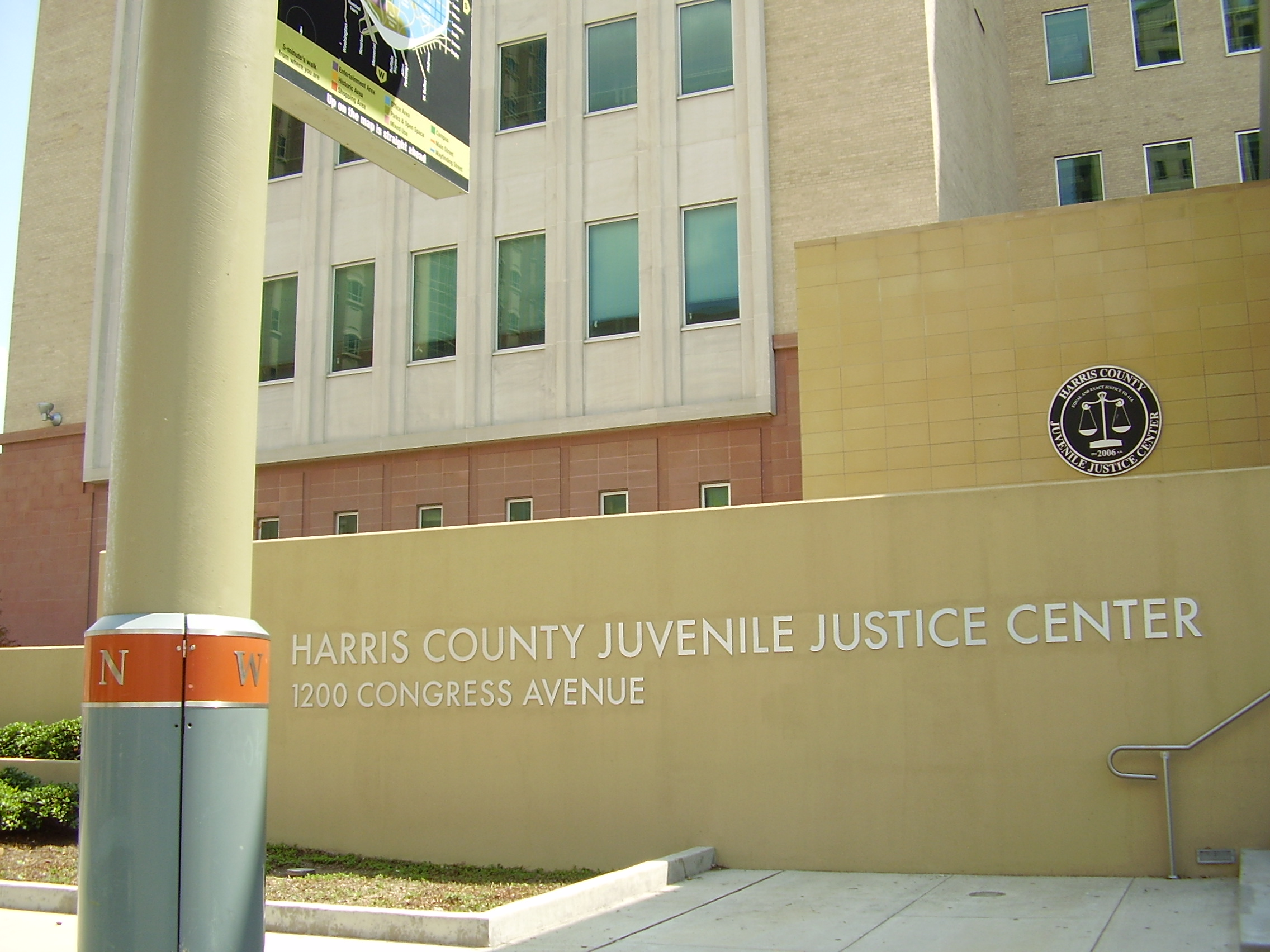
Harris County Juvenile Justice Center

States that are compliant with the JJDPA receive a formula grant. Specifically, eligible states—those that comply with the Act's terms, "establish plans for the administration of juvenile justice in their states and agree to submit annual reports to OJJDP concerning their progress in implementing the plans"—are allocated annual formula grants based on a formula determined by the state's proportion of juveniles (persons under age 18). The JJDPA provides a minimum annual allocation for states receiving funding.

As of 2018, 47 of the 50 states participate in the act; the three nonparticipating states are Wyoming, Connecticut, and Nebraska. The territory of American Samoa also does not participate in the JJDPA program.

== See also ==
- American juvenile justice system
- Youth incarceration in the United States
