= Superman: Krypton Coaster =

Roller coaster in Texas, U.S.

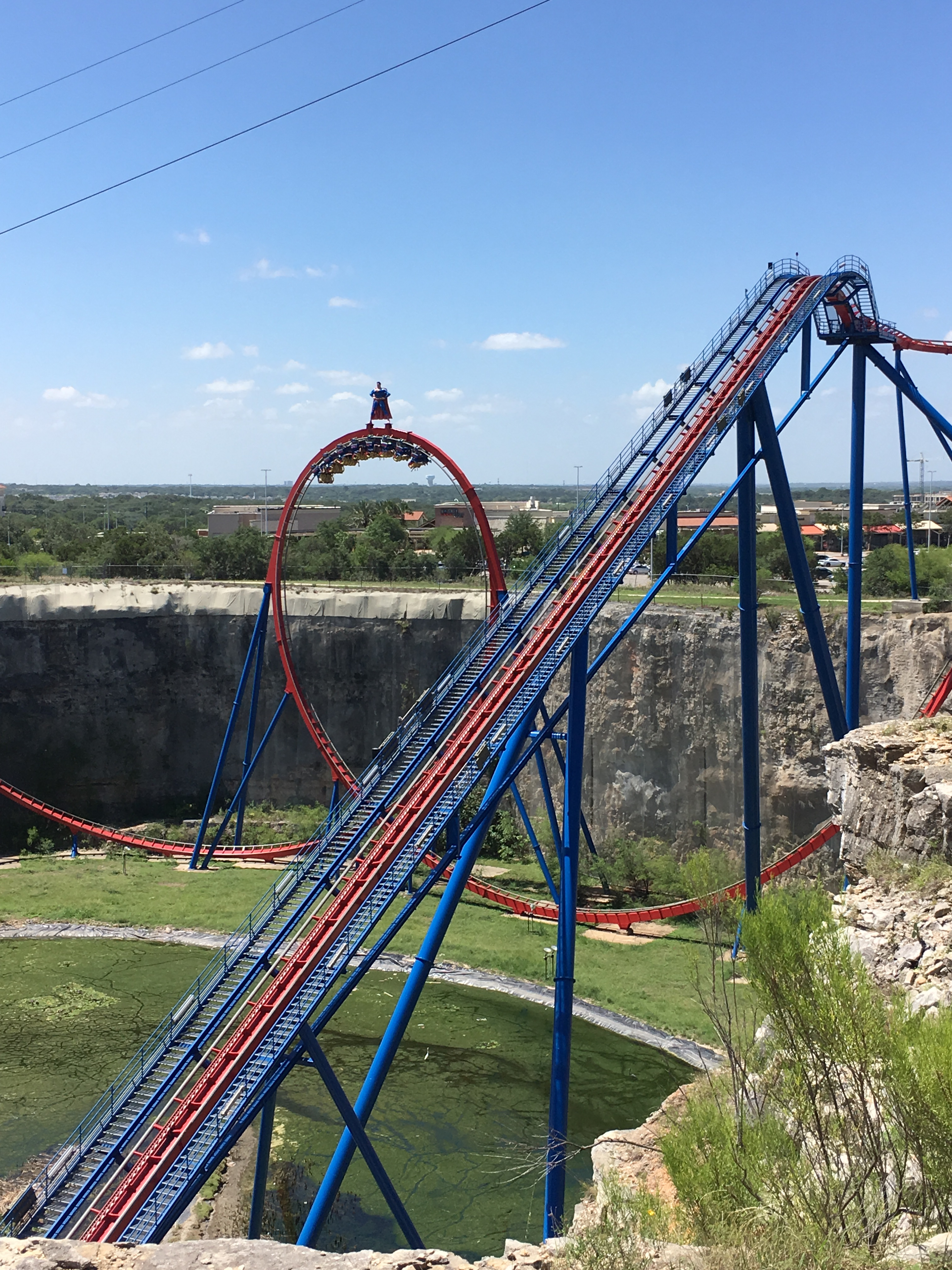

Six Flags Fiesta Texas
- Location: Six Flags Fiesta Texas
- Park section: DC Universe
- Coordinates: 29.595150°N 98.609991°W
- Status: Operating
- Opening date: March 11, 2000
- Cost: $20 million

General statistics
- Type: Steel – Floorless Coaster
- Manufacturer: Bolliger & Mabillard
- Designer: Werner Stengel
- Model: Floorless Coaster - Custom
- Track layout: Terrain
- Lift/launch system: Chain lift hill
- Height: 183 ft (56 m)
- Drop: 168 ft (51 m)
- Length: 4,025 ft (1,227 m)
- Speed: 70 mph (110 km/h)
- Inversions: 6
- Duration: 2:35
- Max vertical angle: 58°
- Capacity: 1600 riders per hour
- G-force: 3.8
- Height restriction: 54 in (137 cm)
- Trains: 3 trains with 8 cars; riders arranged 4 across in a single row for a total of 32 riders per train
- Fast Lane available
- Superman: Krypton Coaster at RCDB

Superman: Krypton Coaster is a steel roller coaster located at Six Flags Fiesta Texas amusement park in San Antonio. Manufactured by Bolliger & Mabillard, the Floorless Coaster model opened to the public in 2000 as one of the first of its kind in the world. The well-received ride held the title for the world's tallest vertical loop (145 feet) from its opening until 2013. Superman: Krypton Coaster stands 168 feet (51 m) tall and reaches a maximum speed of 70 mph (110 km/h).

== History ==
In 1999, Six Flags Great Adventure spent $42 million on new attractions including a prototype Floorless Coaster by Bolliger & Mabillard, Medusa. The immediate popularity of the ride, led to Six Flags Fiesta Texas to announce plans to install a Floorless Coaster in 2000; Superman: Krypton Coaster was announced on November 1, 1999. The announcement of the $20 million roller coaster was a part of a wider multimillion-dollar expansion of Six Flags Fiesta Texas.

At the time of the ride's announcement, construction had already begun on unused land bordered by quarry walls and an irrigation pond. The initial plans for the ride specified it would have seven inversions including a 114-foot-tall (35 m) vertical loop and a 96-foot-tall (29 m) dive loop. Following the ride's announcement, the design was altered to remove the dive loop and increase the size of the vertical loop to 145 feet (44 m). This saw Superman: Krypton Coaster obtain the record for the world's tallest vertical loop when it officially opened to the public on March 11, 2000. It held the title for 13 years until the addition of Full Throttle at Six Flags Magic Mountain in 2013.

On March 6, 2010, Six Flags Fiesta Texas offered exclusive ride time on Superman: Krypton Coaster to help celebrate the ride's 10th anniversary. On June 22, 2013, Superman: Krypton Coaster lost the title of having the world's tallest vertical loop when Six Flags Magic Mountain in Valencia, California opened Full Throttle, which features a 160-foot-tall (49 m) vertical loop, 15 feet (4.6 m) taller than the loop on Superman: Krypton Coaster.

On March 3, 2016, Six Flags announced that the roller coaster would be one of several rides at various Six Flags parks to feature a VR system. Riders have the option of wearing a Samsung Gear VR headset, powered by Oculus to create a 360-degree, 3D experience while riding. It is themed to Superman saving a city from Lex Luthor's Lex Bots who are causing chaos with an anti-gravity ray.

== Characteristics ==
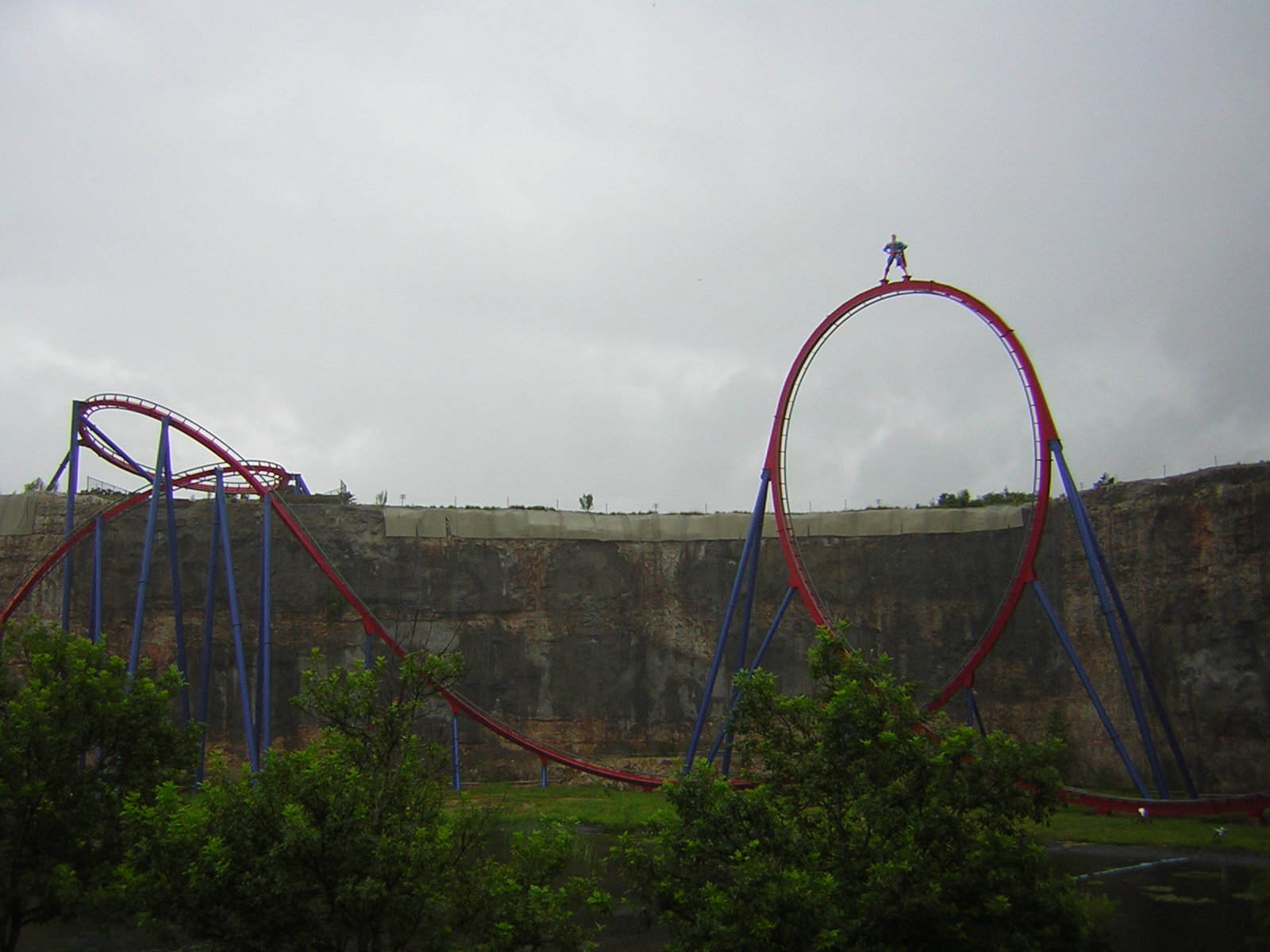
The ride's vertical loop and mid-course helix

=== Statistics ===
The 4,025-foot-long (1,227 m) Superman: Krypton Coaster stands 183 feet (56 m) tall. With a top speed of 70 miles per hour (110 km/h), the ride ties with Iron Rattler as the fastest roller coaster at Six Flags Fiesta Texas. The ride features six inversions including a 145-foot-tall (44 m) vertical loop, a Spriling Camelback (also known as a zero-g roll), a 78-foot-tall (24 m) cobra roll and two Flatspins, similar to a corkscrew.

=== Trains ===
Superman: Krypton Coaster operates with three floorless trains. Each train seats 32 riders in eight rows of four. This gives the ride a theoretical hourly capacity of 1600 riders per hour. The open-air trains feature seats which leave riders' legs dangling above the track. Riders are restrained with over-the-shoulder restraints. As the trains are floorless, the station has a retractable floor for safe boarding.

== Ride experience ==
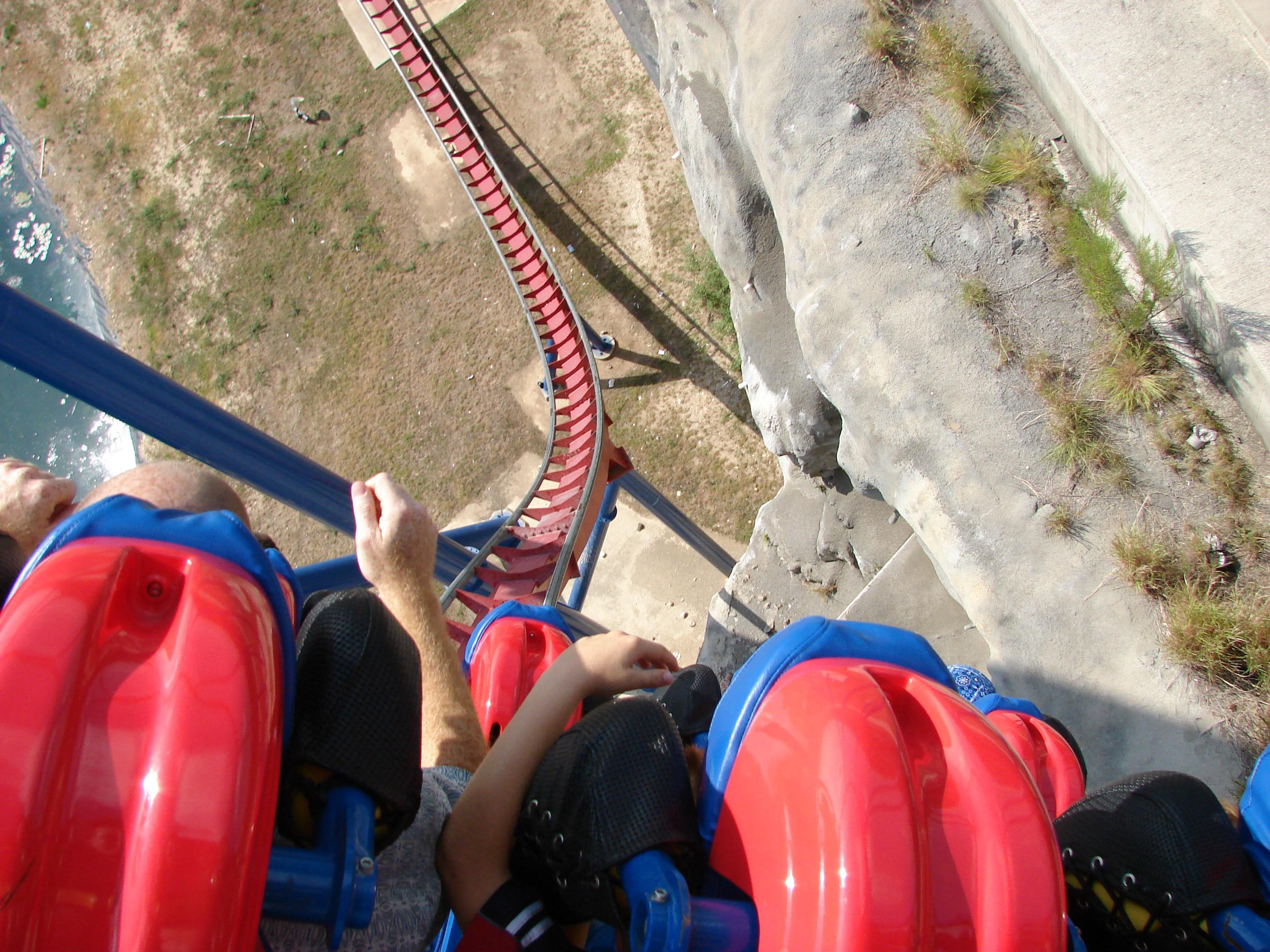
Superman: Krypton Coaster's initial plunge over the quarry wall

After riders have boarded and the station floor is retracted, the train makes a left turn out of the station. This leads directly to the 183-foot-tall (56 m) chain lift hill. Followed by a fairly level 180-degree turn to the right above the quarry wall. This leads into a 168-foot (51 m) drop off the quarry wall directly into the 145-foot-tall (44 m) vertical loop. With the quarry wall on the track's right, the train climbs to the top of the wall and passes through a 360-degree clockwise helix. After dropping from the quarry wall again, the train enters the Sprialing Camelback (zero-g roll), where riders experience a feeling of weightlessness, then through a 78-foot-tall (24 m) cobra roll. Exiting the cobra roll, the train makes a left hand ascent, then veers right as it approaches the quarry wall and enters block brakes. the train dives to the right and enters a set of interlocking Flatspins (corkscrews). After passing through the second Flatspins, the train makes a right hand turn, and rises into the final brake run before returning to the station.

== Reception ==
Prior to launch, general manager of Six Flags Fiesta Texas John Odum stated Superman: Krypton Coaster was "the big-league ride we have really needed". He stated the design of the ride, which interacts with the quarry wall, would make a thrilling ride: "being that close to the wall there is a good sense of speed". In May 2000, two months after Superman: Krypton Coaster opened, it was reported that the park was "off to a flying start" for the season. Six Flags Fiesta Texas officials stated the ride proved popular in its first year of operation.

In Amusement Today's annual Golden Ticket Awards, Superman: Krypton Coaster was ranked in the top 50 steel roller coasters numerous times since its opening. It peaked at position 24 in 2002, before it dropped to 50 in 2008 and rose again to 38 in 2011. Since then, it has not ranked on the Golden Ticket Awards' list of top 50 steel coasters.

Golden Ticket Awards: Top steel Roller Coasters
Year									1998	1999
Ranking									–	–
Year	2000	2001	2002	2003	2004	2005	2006	2007	2008	2009
Ranking	–	36	24	25	27	33	33	36	50	44
Year	2010	2011	2012	2013	2014	2015	2016	2017	2018	2019
Ranking	–	38	–	–	–	–	–	–	–	–
Year	2020	2021	2022	2023	2024	2025	2026			
Ranking	N/A	–	–	–	–	–	–			

Preceded by Riddler's Revenge	World's Tallest Vertical Loop; March 2000 – June 2013	Succeeded by Full Throttle
