= Live for Now =

2017 short film commercial for Pepsi

- Screenshot from the advertisement showing Kendall Jenner giving a police officer a can of Pepsi
- Client: PepsiCo
- Product: Pepsi
- Directed by: Michael Bernard
- Music by: "Lions" by Skip Marley
- Starring: Kendall Jenner

"Live for Now", also known as "Live for Now Moments Anthem", is a 2017 short film commercial for Pepsi by PepsiCo featuring Kendall Jenner and the song "Lions" by Skip Marley. According to a statement from PepsiCo, the ad's purpose was initially to reach millennials and "to project a global message of unity, peace, and understanding." The advertisement was pulled after receiving online backlash, with Pepsi and Jenner being accused of trivializing Black Lives Matter and police brutality.

== Plot ==
The Pepsi commercial features Kendall Jenner and the song "Lions" by Skip Marley. It begins with an Asian cellist on a rooftop. Outside, young people are marching, displaying V signs and carrying signs, including one that says "Join the Conversation". The protesters are smiling and appear to be happy, also carrying signs that say "peace" and "love". Jenner's character is seen modeling at a photoshoot. A photographer in a hijab notices the march and heads outside.

The cellist walks past Jenner's photoshoot and gestures for her to join the march. Jenner removes a blonde wig and hands it to a black woman, wipes off her dark lipstick, and heads toward the march.

Several white police officers are standing in a line formation, watching the march approach them. Jenner appears in a more casual outfit and walks up to the police officers, handing one of the officers a can of Pepsi. The photographer snaps multiple photographs of the interaction. After the police officer drinks from the can, the crowd cheers enthusiastically. The photographer puts aside her camera and hugs someone nearby in celebration.

== Production ==
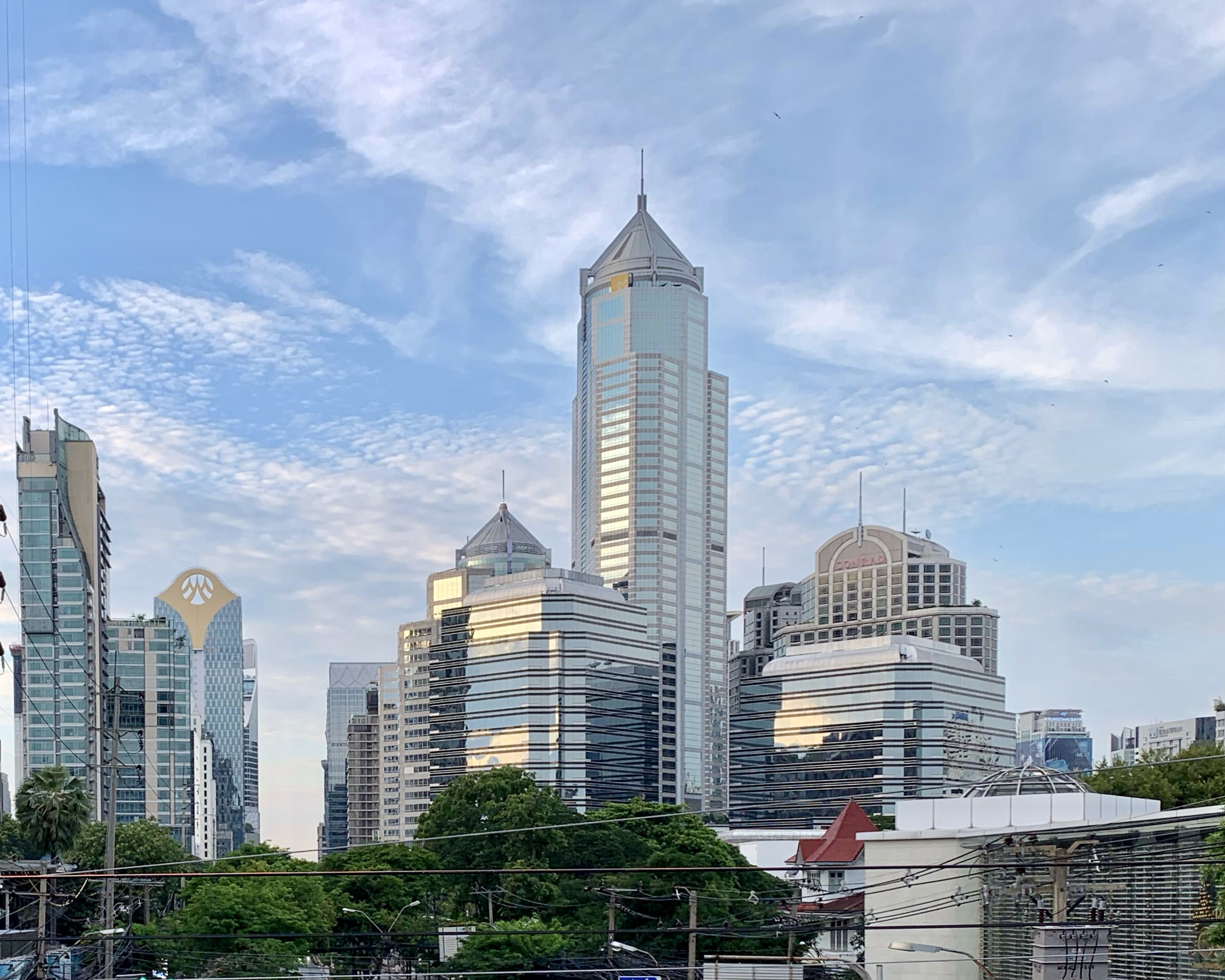
All Seasons Place in Bangkok where parts of the commercial were shot in

The "Live for Now – Moments" commercial in April 2017 was a play off an existing "Live for Now" campaign the company created in 2012. Six people were credited with creating the ad, and The Mirror reported that all were white. The ad was produced by PepsiCo's in-house content creation team, Creators League Studio. Jenner had no involvement in the creative process and no advanced knowledge of the marketing vision. She first knew the story-line when she got the script and moved forward with appearing in the ad.

Due to the fact that Pepsi's in-house creative team came up with the concept, many people expressed that this incident is a prime example of the risks associated with group-think, claiming that in this instance, company culture overlooked potential tone-deafness.

The commercial was shot in Bangkok, Thailand, with identified locations including Omni Tower Sukhumvit Nana where its helicopter pad was featured in the opening shot, and All Seasons Place. According to a local producer not involved in the ad, the decision to shoot in Thailand was likely due to the lower cost of extras. An actor from the ad said that the extras were from Thailand and other countries outside the U.S.

== Reaction ==
The advertisement was pulled by the company one day after its distribution due to criticism. The response to the ad's release has been described as "instant condemnation" of the PepsiCo brand. The company released a statement, saying:

Pepsi was trying to project a global message of unity, peace and understanding. Clearly we missed the mark, and we apologize. We did not intend to make light of any serious issue. We are removing the content and halting any further rollout. We also apologize for putting Kendall Jenner in this position.

The advertisement's creators have been widely criticized on social media and by media outlets for attempting to capitalize on imagery imitating protests in the Black Lives Matter movement, including Taking a Stand in Baton Rouge, the iconic image of a woman, named Iesha Evans, who approached heavily armed police alone and was arrested in a Baton Rouge protest in July 2016. Researchers of branding and marketing have observed the identity politics aspect of the spot depicted by the marching masses, but questioned the credibility of subverting the police towards a "melting pot" model. Bernice King, daughter of civil rights leader Martin Luther King Jr, remarked, "If only Daddy would have known about the power of #Pepsi". Initially, Pepsi stated, "This is a global ad that reflects people from different walks of life coming together in a spirit of harmony, and we think that's an important message to convey". According to marketing expert Mike Jackson, part of the problem was that Pepsi did not have a history of promoting social justice causes. Furthermore, Kendall Jenner does not have a reputation of being a social activist.

Entertainment Weekly called the ad "a tone-deaf attempt to co-opt a movement of political resistance". Many current activists spoke out on Twitter in response to the advertisement, collectively expressing that it depicts an unrealistic situation that is opposite of the real-world protesting experience. Specifically, users said that the ad minimized the seriousness of danger and frustration felt during police-brutality protests.

Saturday Night Live made reference to the commercial in a sketch for the April 8, 2017, episode, where the ad's writer and director, played by Beck Bennett, is being chastised for the ad's content by family and friends on the phone just before filming; however, when Jenner (Cecily Strong) discusses the commercial with her friends on the phone, she astutely (albeit unintentionally) explains the true nature of the commercial's plot.

The full advertisement was parodied in 2022 on the American TV series The Boys, in the fourth episode of the third season. A-Train, as part of his rebranding as a social justice advocate, advertises his line of energy drinks in a near-identical fashion to the Live for Now campaign.

Some of the starring extras are locals of Bangkok and Thailand. Many were reportedly unaware of the magnitude of the protests in the US.

=== Jenner's response ===
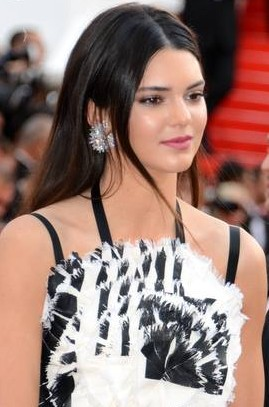
The commercial features Kendall Jenner (pictured in 2014).

According to her family, Kendall Jenner was heavily impacted by the backlash following her appearance in the advertisement. Her older sister, Kim Kardashian, released a statement, saying:

"I see her at home crying, but in the media she looks another way because she's not addressing it. The team and everyone's telling her not to, and I'm just like, 'This is wrong. You need to speak up.' She was like, 'I don't ever want to show that footage of me crying.' She was trying to not make excuses or be dramatic, but that was what she was going through at the time."

Jenner did not make a public statement addressing the situation. Public backlash put Jenner at the forefront of this controversy, as Twitter users claimed that she was a talentless and privileged individual and additionally that she had no experience with racial discrimination or police brutality, making her the wrong choice for the campaign.

Over eight months after the ad's release, Kendall Jenner spoke about the incident on the reality television show, Keeping Up With The Kardashians. She stated that while she initially did not see the issue with the "Live for Now" campaign, following the public's reaction, she was able to see it from a different perspective. Jenner claimed that she never intended to hurt anyone through her involvement and expressed her sorrow for doing so.

Though Pepsi sales hit an all-time low in the years following the ad's release, Jenner's career was not as heavily impacted.

== See also ==
- 2017 in American television
- Mountain Dew goat commercials
