= Journal of Small Business Management =

- Discipline: Business, management
- Language: English
- Edited by: Dr. Ayman El Tarabishy

Publication details
- History: 1963-present
- Publisher: Taylor & Francis on behalf of the International Council for Small Business
- Frequency: Quarterly
- Impact factor: 6.2 (2022)

Standard abbreviations
- ISO 4: J. Small Bus. Manag.

Indexing
- CODEN: JSBMAU
- ISSN: 0047-2778 (print); 1540-627X (web)
- LCCN: 77618049
- OCLC no.: 01800008

Links
- Journal homepage; Online access; Online archive; Journal page on ICSB website

The Journal of Small Business Management is a quarterly peer-reviewed academic journal published by Taylor & Francis on behalf of the International Council for Small Business (ICSB), and circulated in over 60 countries. The journal was published by Wiley-Blackwell until January 2020. The journal was first published in February 1963. It covers all aspects of small business management and entrepreneurship, and was the first journal dedicated to these topics. The editor-in-chief is Dr. Ayman El Tarabishy (George Washington University).

According to the publisher's website, the journal has a 2022 Journal Citation Reports impact factor of 6.2. Journal of Small Business Management was listed as a Financial Times top 40 journal between 2007 and 2010.
