= Full Throttle (roller coaster) =

Roller coaster at Magic Mountain

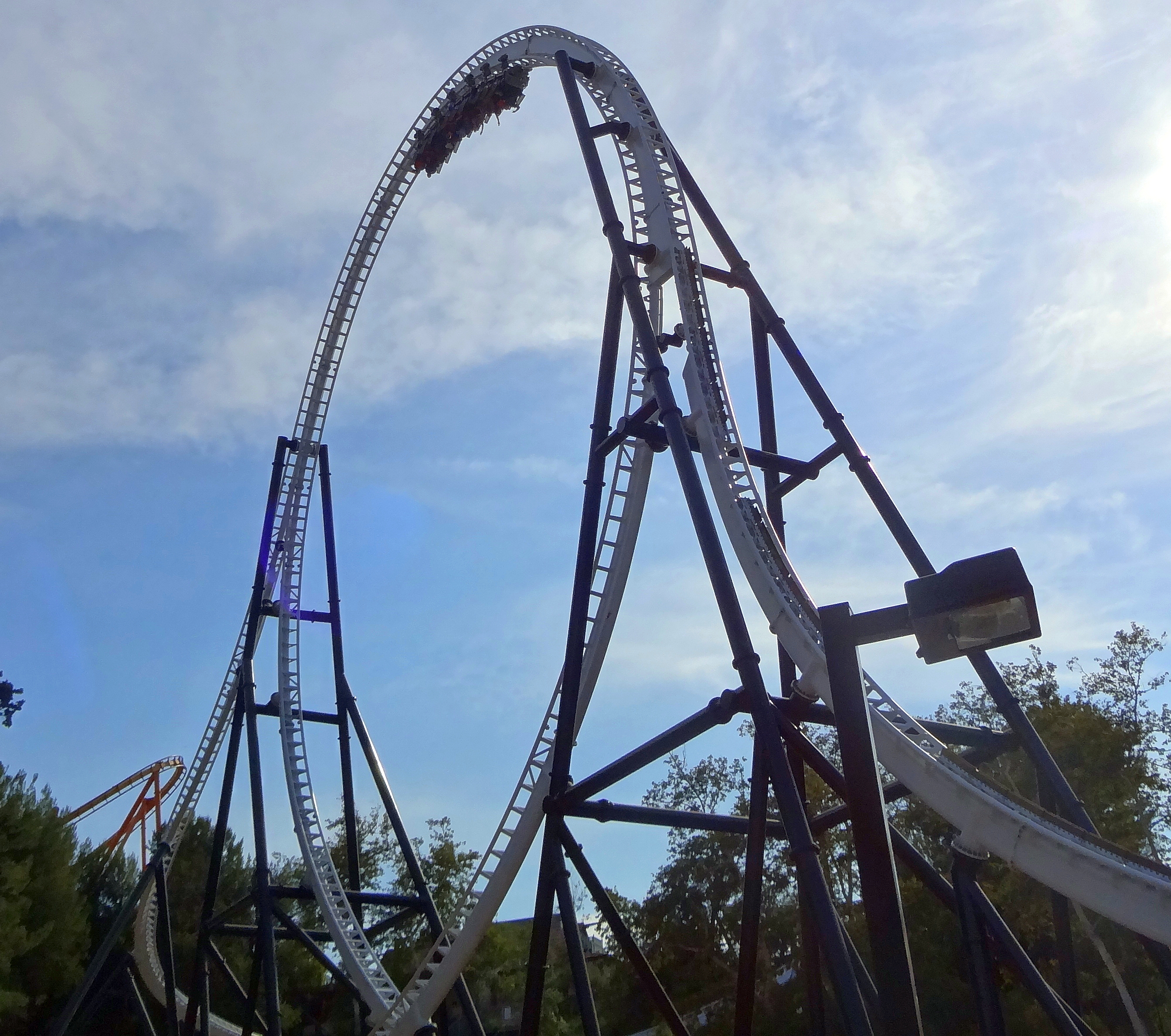
- Full Throttle's features the world's third tallest vertical loop at 160 ft. The train uses the loop twice for the ride.

Six Flags Magic Mountain
- Location: Six Flags Magic Mountain
- Park section: Six Flags Plaza
- Coordinates: 34.423178°N 118.597174°W
- Status: Operating
- Opening date: June 22, 2013
- Cost: US$6 million
- Replaced: Log Jammer

General statistics
- Type: Steel – Launched
- Manufacturer: Premier Rides
- Track layout: Terrain
- Lift/launch system: 3 linear synchronous motor launches
- Height: 164 ft (50 m)
- Length: 2,200 ft (670 m)
- Speed: 70 mph (110 km/h)
- Inversions: 2
- Duration: 1:30
- Capacity: 800 riders per hour
- G-force: 4.0
- Height restriction: 54 in (137 cm)
- Trains: 2 trains with 3 cars. Riders are arranged 2 across in 3 rows for a total of 18 riders per train.
- Fast Lane available
- Must transfer from wheelchair
- Full Throttle at RCDB

Full Throttle is a launched roller coaster located in Six Flags Plaza at Six Flags Magic Mountain in Valencia, California. Designed and manufactured by Premier Rides, the ride opened to the public on June 22, 2013. It featured the world's tallest vertical loop of 160 feet (49 m) when it opened, a record that was surpassed in 2016 by Flash at Lewa Adventure in Xianyang, China. Its “top hat” element is also unique in the way it is situated on top of a vertical loop. It is the only roller coaster to have track on the bottom and top of a vertical loop.

== History ==
In late 2012 Baltimore-based roller coaster manufacturer Premier Rides was announced as the builder of the coaster. Construction of Full Throttle started shortly after the Log Jammer log flume was closed on October 31, 2011. In March 2012, details of a launched roller coaster named Full Throttle were leaked to the Los Angeles Times. On April 4, 2012, Six Flags trademarked the name Full Throttle.

On August 28, 2012, Six Flags Magic Mountain officially announced Full Throttle. Along with Full Throttle there would be a new themed section to host the new coaster.

In mid-November 2012, construction walls went up, blocking off the construction site in Six Flags Plaza. For the new themed section, the What the Fried? restaurant and the Warner Bros. Kids' Club theater were demolished before the construction walls went up. By mid-December, the first pieces of Full Throttle's track had arrived on site. In late February, Full Throttle construction went vertical. On April 12, 2013 construction was completed.

Six Flags Magic Mountain confirmed on Twitter that Full Throttle would open on June 22, 2013. Later that year in November, seat belts were installed on both Full Throttle and Goliath. A permanent covering over the loading station was also added during this time.

== Ride experience ==
The train is launched out of the station from 0 to 70 mph (0 to 113 km/h) using linear synchronous motors. Riders immediately enter the record-breaking 160-foot-tall (49 m) vertical loop, which is followed by a high-banked curve to the right and another to the left as the train approaches the second inversion, a dive loop. This inversion drops down into a tunnel previously used for the park's monorail system, where the train comes to a halt. The train is then launched backwards out of the tunnel and partially up the dive loop. Once it loses its backward momentum, the train returns forward into the tunnel and is launched out of the tunnel and straight into a high-G turn to the left. Riders then go up the “top hat” that is located on top of the loop. Riders drop from the hill and reach the brake run before entering a 180-degree turn to the left back into the station. The duration of the 2,200 foot (670 m) ride is under one minute.

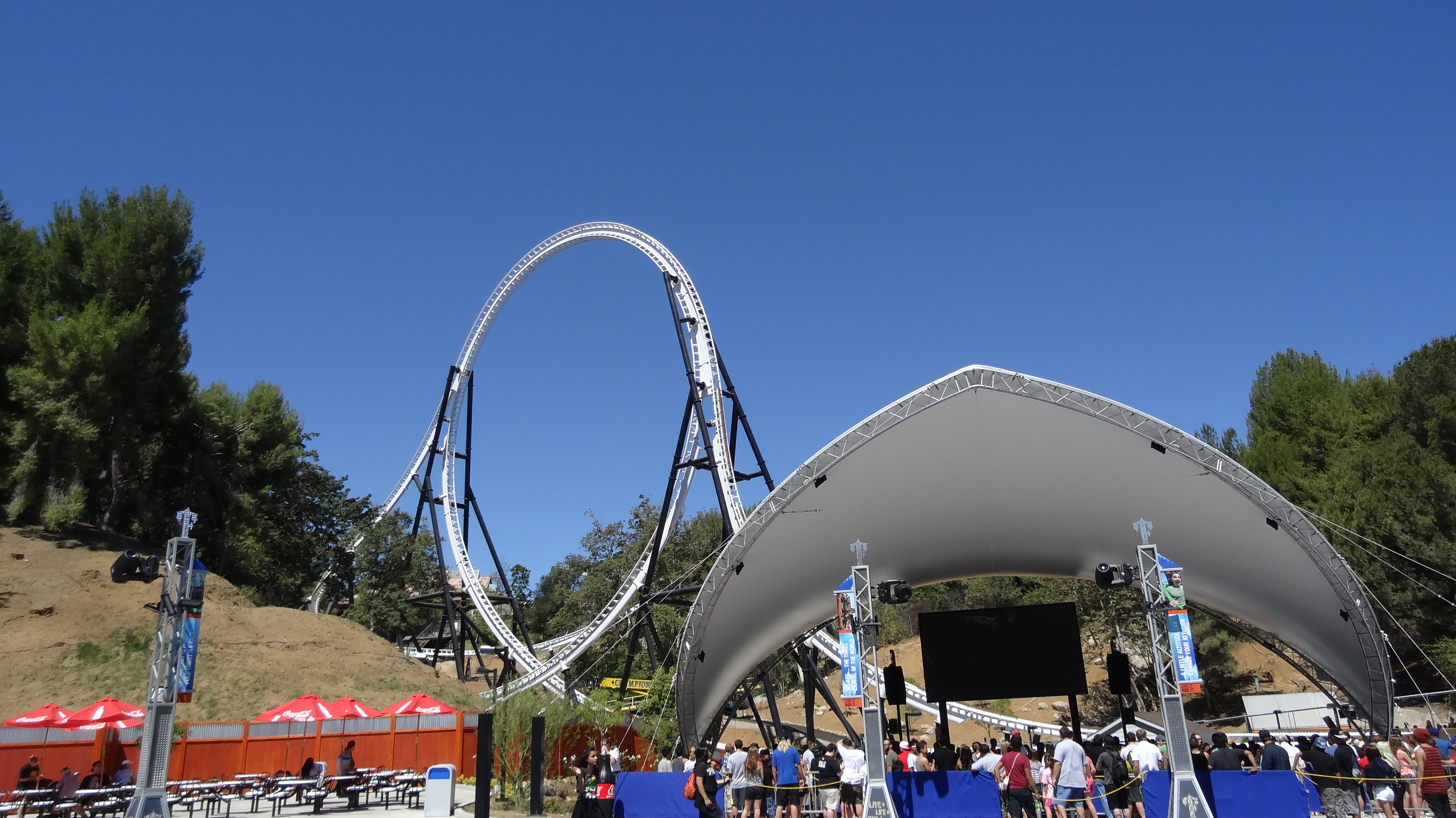
Entrance to Full Throttle with the 160 foot loop

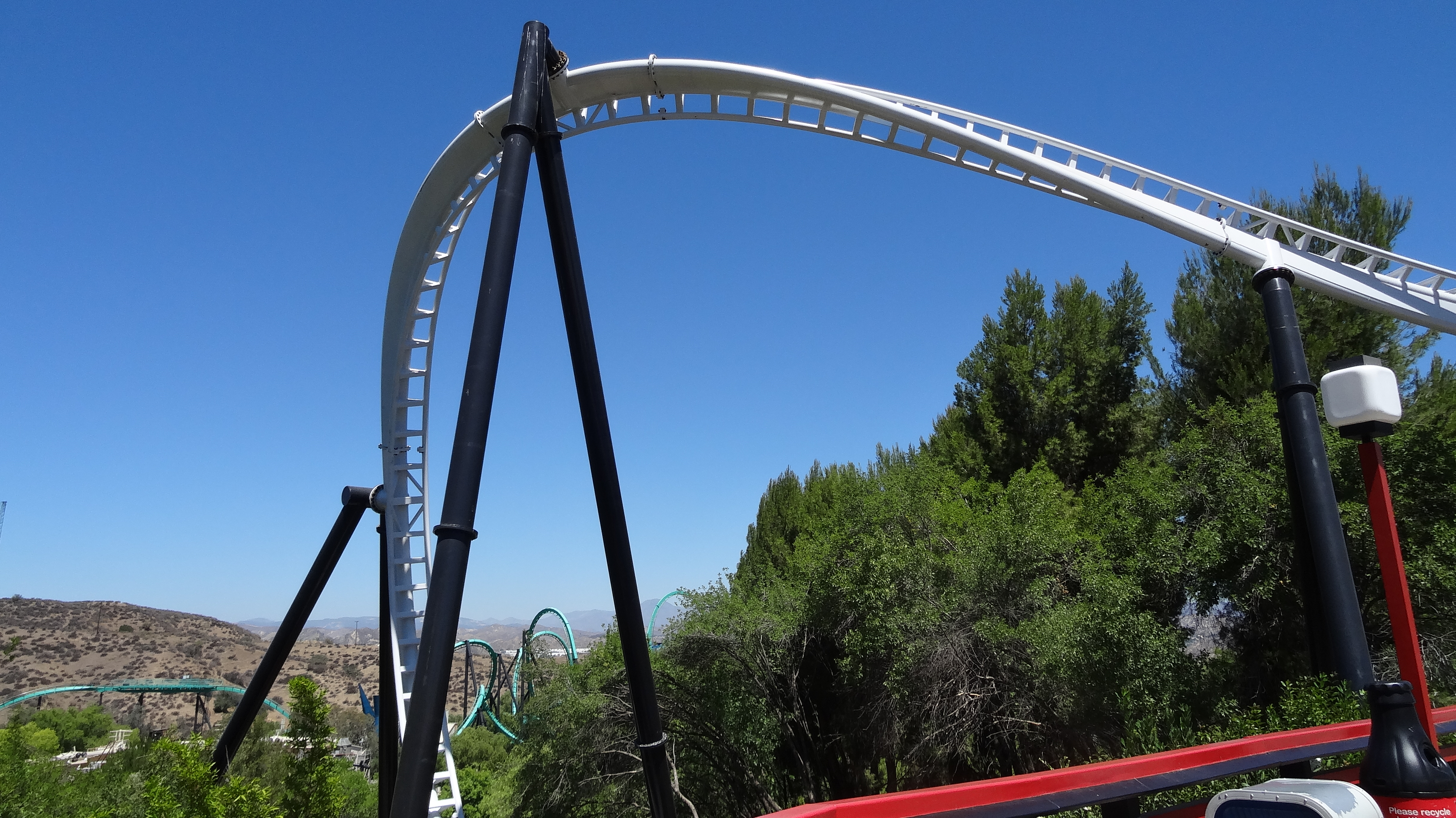
The dive loop before entering the tunnel

=== Trains ===
Full Throttle has 2 trains with 3 cars per train. Riders are arranged 2 across in 3 rows for a total of 18 riders per train. The ride's capacity is 800 riders per hour.

=== Plaza and station ===
Full Throttle's station was once open aired, but shade has since been placed over the station. Its theme is unlike other coasters in the park. In front of the station is a dining area and gift shop in a building with "Full Throttle" badging. There is also a stage where dance parties are often held featuring a DJ, drum player, and "Full Throttle dancers".

== Reception ==
Upon its building, Full Throttle received positive reviews from critics. Brady MacDonald of the Los Angeles Times states, "you ride Full Throttle and there's only one reaction: wow". MacDonald claims the ride starts "silky smooth and whisper quiet" and launches as a "rocket-fast launch". However, MacDonald criticized the placement of the brakes partway down the top hat.

== Records ==
Upon debut, Full Throttle surpassed Superman: Krypton Coaster at Six Flags Fiesta Texas for the tallest vertical loop on a roller coaster. In January 2016 the record was conceded to Mack-manufactured Flash at Lewa Adventure amusement park located in China. However, Full Throttle's loop remains the tallest loop in North America. This record was broken by Tormenta Rampaging Run, which opened July 9, 2026 with a 179 ft tall vertical loop.

The coaster features a “top hat” element, unique in the way it is situated on the top of the vertical loop.

== Awards ==
Golden Ticket Awards: Top steel Roller Coasters
Year									1998	1999
Ranking									–	–
Year	2000	2001	2002	2003	2004	2005	2006	2007	2008	2009
Ranking	–	–	–	–	–	–	–	–	–	–
Year	2010	2011	2012	2013	2014	2015	2016	2017	2018	2019
Ranking	–	–	–	–	39	–	–	50	–	–
Year	2020	2021	2022	2023	2024	2025				
Ranking	N/A	–	–	–	–	–				

Preceded by Superman: Krypton Coaster	World's Tallest Vertical Loop; June 2013 – February 24, 2016	Succeeded by Flying Aces
