= Youth PROMISE Act =

The Youth Prison Reduction through Opportunities, Mentoring, Intervention, Support, and Education Act, or Youth PROMISE Act (H.R.1064) was proposed in the 111th Congress on February 13, 2009, by Democratic Rep. Robert C. Scott (VA-3), referred to the House Committee on the Judiciary. The measure seeks to amend the Juvenile Justice and Delinquency Prevention Act of 1974 with the intent to prevent and intervene against criminal delinquency and youth gang activity through assessing and developing standards and evidence-based practices. The proposed legislation also calls for data-collection from designated geographic areas to assess the needs and extant resources for youth violence prevention and intervention; and authorizes the administrator of the Office of Juvenile Justice and Delinquency Prevention to award grants to local governments and Native American tribes for the purposes of developing youth violence prevention services. The Promise act has also led to a reduction in youth arrest. This will enable the youthful offender, once they become of age, to pass an FBI background check.
