= Smile (Katy Perry album) =

2020 studio album by Katy Perry

- Standard cover

Studio album by Katy Perry
- Released: August 28, 2020
- Recorded: 2018–2020
- Studios: Heavy Duty (Burbank, California); Orange Grove (Hollywood, California); Glendale Boulevard Swamp (Los Angeles, California); MXM (Los Angeles, California); Pulse (Los Angeles, California); Unsub (Los Angeles, California); Westlake (Los Angeles, California); Windmark (Los Angeles, California); Quarantine 805 (Santa Barbara, California); Secret Garden (Santa Barbara, California); A-House (Stockholm, Sweden); House Mouse (Stockholm, Sweden); MXM (Stockholm, Sweden); BLND (Sweden); Studios 301 (Sydney, Australia)
- Genre: Pop
- Length: 36:36
- Label: Capitol
- Producers: Josh Abraham; Johan Carlsson; John DeBold; Dreamlab; Andrew Goldstein; Oscar Görres; Oscar Holter; Ilya; Ian Kirkpatrick; The Monsters & Strangerz; Oligee; Charlie Puth; Pierre-Luc Rioux; John Ryan; Stargate; Zedd

Katy Perry chronology
Witness (2017)	Smile (2020)	143 (2024)

Singles from Smile
- 1. "Daisies" Released: May 15, 2020; 2. "Smile" Released: July 10, 2020

Smile is the sixth studio album by the American singer-songwriter Katy Perry. It was released on August 28, 2020, by Capitol Records, three years after its predecessor Witness (2017). Perry worked with various producers on the album, such as Josh Abraham, Carolina Liar, the Daylights, G Koop, Andrew Goldstein, Oligee, Oscar Görres, Oscar Holter, Ilya, Ian Kirkpatrick, the Monsters & Strangerz, Charlie Puth, Stargate and Zedd. She described Smile as her "journey towards the light, with stories of resilience, hope, and love". Primarily a pop record, Smile is characterized by themes of self-help and empowerment.

Two singles were released from the album: "Daisies", the lead single, was released on May 15, 2020, and peaked at number 40 on the US Billboard Hot 100; it was followed by the title track. Smile also contains Perry's 2019 singles "Never Really Over" and "Harleys in Hawaii" in its standard tracklist, while the Japanese and fan editions of the album further include her other preceding singles, "Small Talk" (2019) and "Never Worn White" (2020). "What Makes a Woman" was also released as a promotional single, alongside remixes of "Resilient" and "Cry About It Later".

Upon release, Smile received mixed reviews from music critics, who praised Perry's earnestness but criticized its familiar lyrics and production, which they found to be redundant in her catalogue. Commercially, Smile reached the top five in Australia, Belgium (Wallonia), Canada, New Zealand, Portugal, Scotland, Spain, the United States, and the United Kingdom. The album has been certified Platinum in Canada and Norway. Although Smile did not have a tour, due to complications surrounding the COVID-19 pandemic, songs were performed on both her concert residency, Play, and the Lifetimes Tour for 143. The album was also promoted with The Smile Video Series, where music videos were made for select tracks from the album.

== Background and conception ==
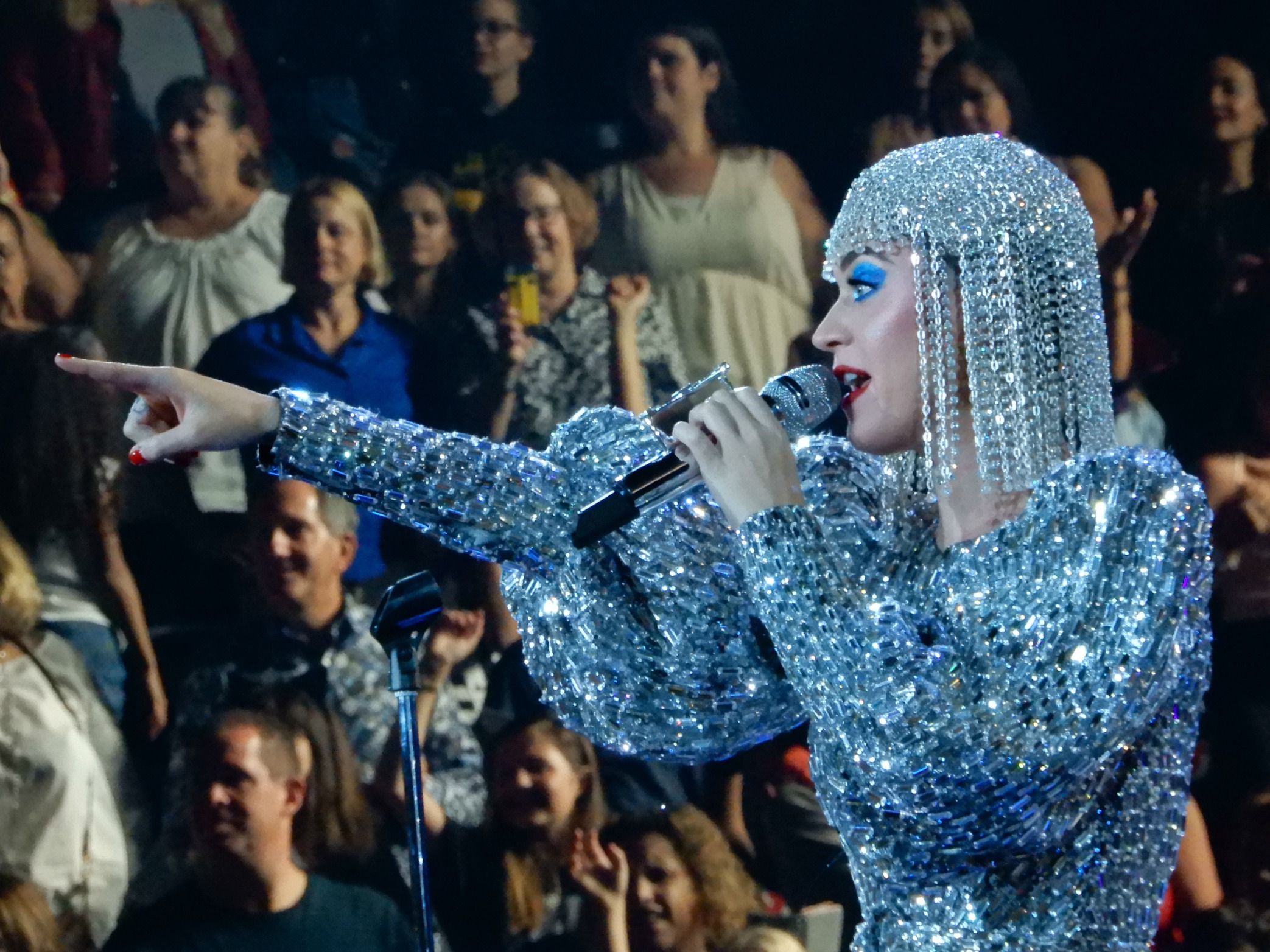
Many of Smile's songs were written and recorded during Witness: The Tour.

Katy Perry stated she was struggling with situational depression in 2017, following the underperformance of her fifth studio album Witness, public criticism of her, and breakup with then-boyfriend Orlando Bloom; she conceived Smile during this period. In March 2018, Ian Kirkpatrick announced he had worked with Perry on new music. In an interview with The Fader, he stated: "We did a couple of days and she is amazing." He further stated that working with Perry was "someone I've wanted to work with my whole life, and she was literally the most normal, no-ego person." In 2019, she released the singles "Never Really Over", "Small Talk" and "Harleys in Hawaii".

In March 2020, Perry revealed her pregnancy with Bloom, via the music video for her single "Never Worn White". The pregnancy influenced Smile as well. Perry also announced her intentions of releasing "a lot" of new music during the year's summer. In May, she announced "Daisies" as the lead single of her new album. The same month, Amazon Alexa announced the album's release date as August 14, 2020. In a June 2020 interview with Billboard, Perry discussed a new song, titled "Teary Eyes". She later confirmed the following month that "Never Really Over" would be on the album. The same month, the album's title was confirmed as Smile, after one of the songs on the album.

=== Theme and artwork ===
Perry explained that Smile is about "finding the light at the end of the tunnel", and taking back your smile, and that the album comes from a place where she fell in after her career and relationship with Orlando Bloom hit a low point back in 2017. She discussed struggles with depression and suicidal thoughts, and stated that gratitude is what saved her life. Perry also defined the album as her "journey towards the light, with stories of resilience, hope, and love". The album's artwork features Perry as "a glum clown with a red nose and a blue and white checkered suit above the title, Smile". The fan edition comes with a lenticular cover.

== Release and promotion ==
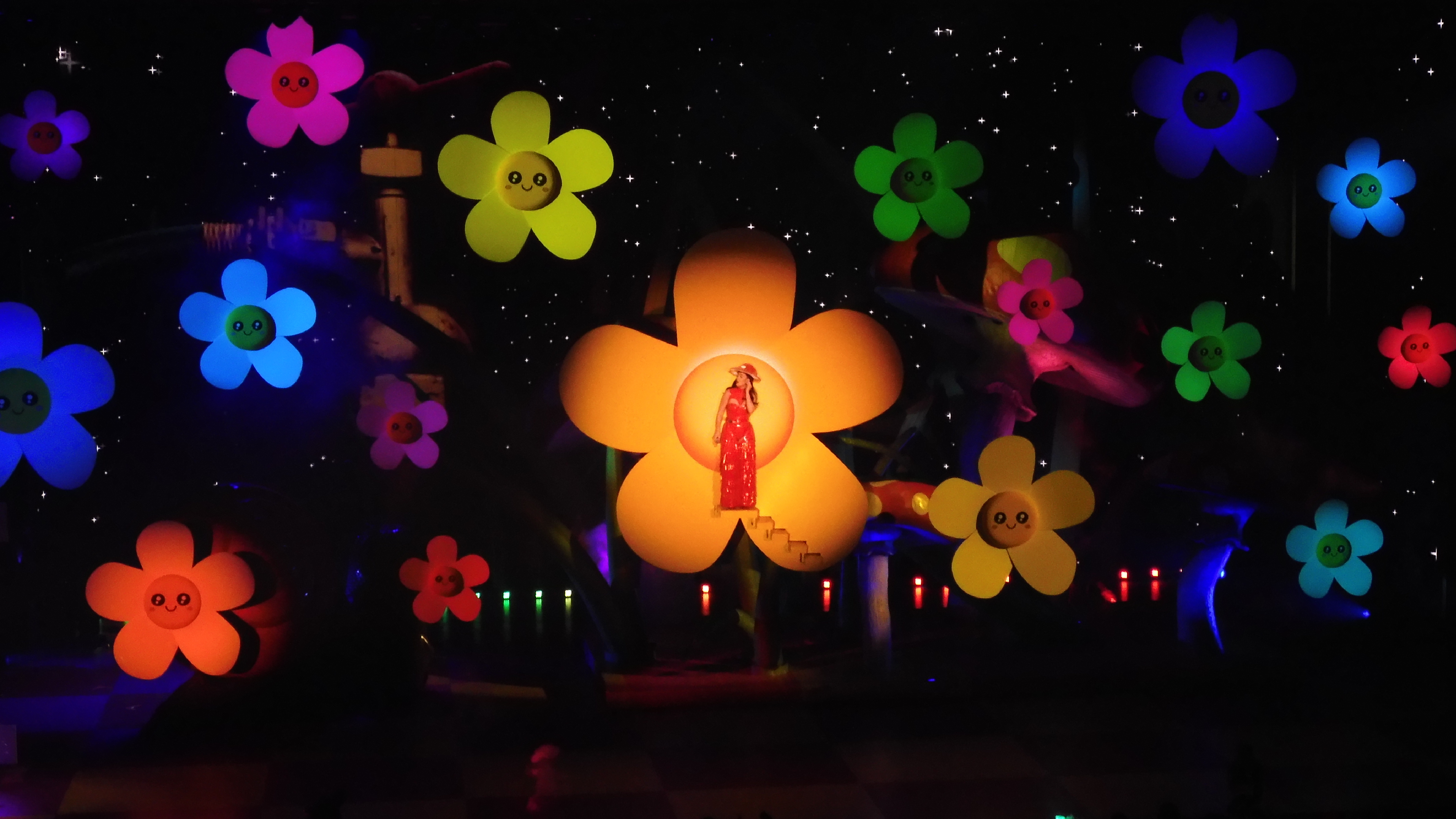
Perry performing "Daisies" during her residency Play

The singer unveiled the cover artwork of Smile via a Twitter game that involved her fans/followers tweeting about the album to "pop virtual balloons in order to uncover" the album cover. On July 27, 2020, she announced that the album release date had been pushed back two weeks due to "unavoidable production delays". In August 2020, she announced a limited edition collection of vinyl picture discs and alternative CD packaging for the album. Five alternative covers/vinyl picture discs were available for pre-order for a period of 5 days. Smile was also released as a bone white vinyl, a picture disc, a cassette, and a limited deluxe edition CD with a lenticular cover, titled the "Fan edition."

Smile was released on August 28, 2020. A series of animated music videos titled The Smile Video Series was released, which featured animated music videos for seven songs from Smile. Each video showcased a different style of animation, with one being released each day between August 26 and September 1, 2020. On November 9, 2020, Perry performed "Never Really Over" and "Not the End of the World" as a part of her setlist for the TMall Double 11 Gala. She performed "Only Love" with Darius Rucker at the American Music Awards of 2020 on November 22, 2020. It marked her first televised performance after giving birth to her first child, Daisy Dove Bloom. A remix of the track "Cry About It Later", featuring Luísa Sonza and Bruno Martini, was released on April 24, 2021, alongside a lyric video. She also included the solo version of song in her setlist at the Lazada Super Party. Many songs from the album were performed at Perry's 2021–2023 Las Vegas residency, Play. Perry performed "Tucked" and "Teary Eyes" for first time at Rock in Rio on September 20, 2024.

=== Singles ===
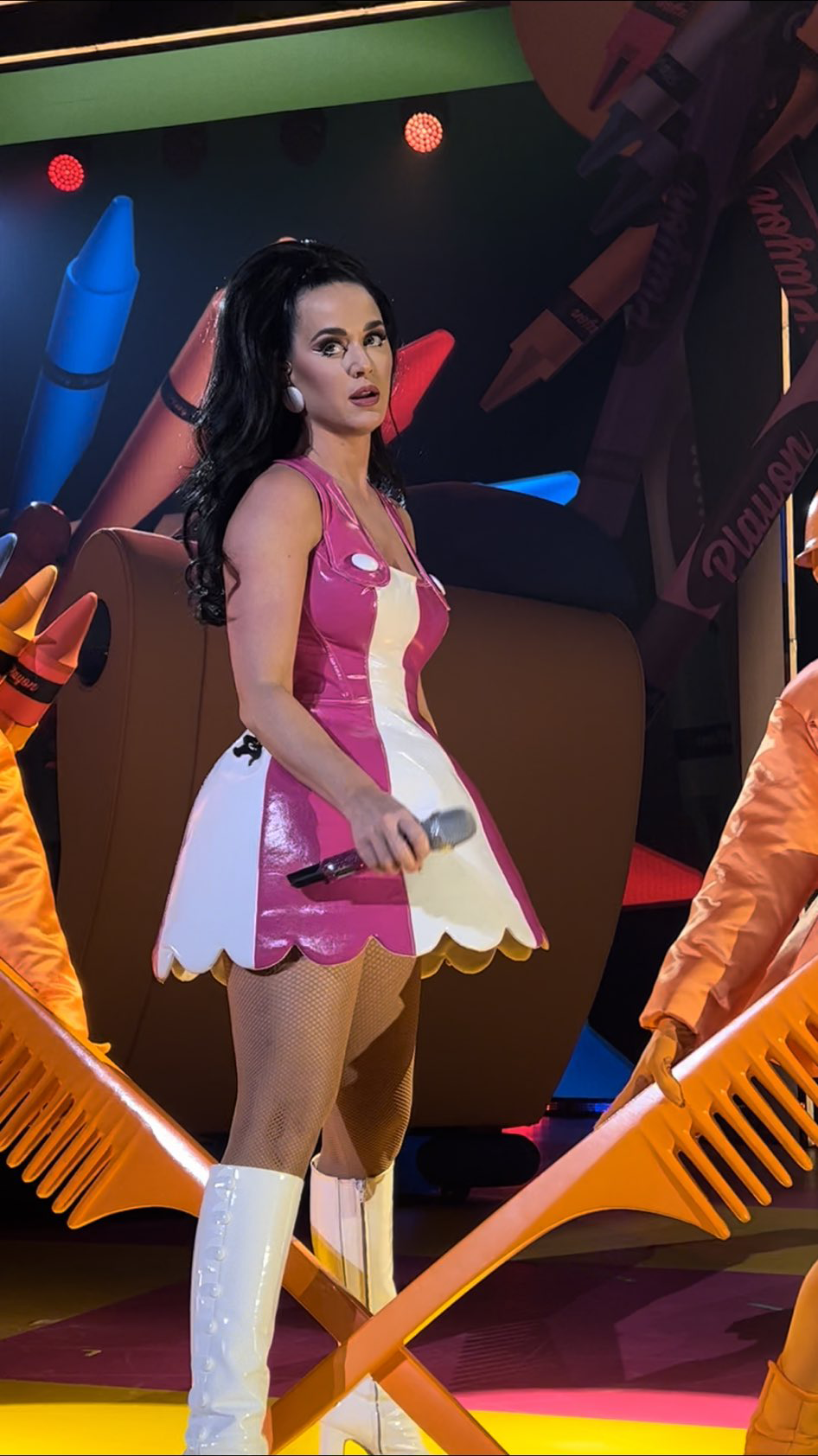
Perry performing "Not the End of the World" during her residency Play

Throughout 2019 and 2020, Perry released four solo songs, originally marketed as standalone singles. "Never Really Over", released on May 31, 2019, was announced to be on Smile by Perry in June 2020. "Harleys in Hawaii" was revealed to be on the standard track list upon the release of the album pre-order. "Small Talk" and "Never Worn White" did not make the standard track list, but ended up as bonus tracks on the "Fan" and Japanese editions of the album.

"Daisies" was released on May 15, 2020, as the album's lead single. It debuted at number 40 on the US Billboard Hot 100. "Smile", the title track, was released as the second single on July 10, 2020, along with the album pre-order. Perry then released "What Makes a Woman" as a promotional single ahead of the album, on August 20, 2020. She released an acoustic version exclusive to her Vevo page on the same day, and revealed that the track is dedicated to her daughter.

"Cry About It Later" was released as a promotional single for the record on August 28, 2020. In April 2021, Perry released a remix of this song with Brazilian DJ, Bruno Martini, who remixed the song and featured vocals from Brazilian singer Luísa Sonza. On November 17, 2020, a remix of "Resilient" featuring Tiësto and Aitana was released as the album's second promotional single. A music video was released for the remix on the same day, and is a part of the Open to Better campaign by Coca-Cola.

== Critical reception ==
Professional ratings
Aggregate scores
Source	Rating
AnyDecentMusic?	5.3/10
Metacritic	58/100
Review scores
Source	Rating
AllMusic	3/5 stars
The A.V. Club	B−
Clash	2/10
The Daily Telegraph	3/5 stars
Entertainment Weekly	B−
The Independent	3/5 stars
The Irish Times	3/5 stars
NME	2/5 stars
Pitchfork	5.7/10
The Sydney Morning Herald	2/5 stars

Smile received mixed reviews from critics, who deemed it a "relatively solid album", but criticized its familiar sound and "cliched" lyrics. At Metacritic, which assigns a normalized rating out of 100 to reviews from publications, Smile received a weighted average score of 58, based on 18 reviews, indicating "mixed or average reviews". AnyDecentMusic? gave the album 5.3 out of 10, based on their assessment of the critical consensus.

Lindsay Zolandz of The New York Times thought that Smile tries to add brightness to the dark, with a lightness that was absent in its predecessor, Witness (2017). Mark Kennedy of Chicago Tribune deemed the album a course-correction that sets Perry back into pure pop, and labeled most of the album "bit of a bummer" due its apologetic tone. The i newspaper's Joe Muggs complimented the restrained production and Perry's maturation as a pop star, but dismissed the lyrical content as "bit too much self-help book redemption". Writing for The Daily Telegraph, Kate Solomon noted that Smile feels very "so earnest that it strays into cringe-worthy territory", but displays the strongest traits of Perry's music: "fizzy bops" and huge hooks.

USA Today writer Patrick Ryan opined that Smile exudes newfound joy, with some of the most carefree songs of the singer's career. However, he criticized the self-empowerment lyrics as clichéd, adding that Perry gives listeners a déjà vu rather than seeking a new musical direction. Leah Greenblatt of Entertainment Weekly described the album's sound as too familiar, unaltered from Perry's older discography. Craig Jenkins of Vulture found Smile to be lyrically weak, but overall an improvement over Witness, and named the singles as its best tracks. Alexa Camp from Slant Magazine wrote that Perry avoids experimentation by opting to stay "in her lane". Kish Lal of The Sydney Morning Herald branded Smile as falling flat despite the honesty in subjects dealt. Louise Bruton of The Irish Times asserted that the album possesses perfect melodies, but criticized the lyrics as "subpar".

In unfavorable reviews, Pitchfork writer Dani Blum dubbed Smile as cliché-ridden pop with confusing platitudes, that is also inapt for the COVID-19 pandemic. The A.V. Club's Alex McLevy opined that Perry is "struggling to be taken seriously", as Smile holds back her ability to evolve, instead of the intended showcase of the singer's "real" side. Stereogum's Chris DeVille wrote the record was dull and unadventurous, and did not believe the lyricism was memorable, while Helen Brown of The Independent called the album forgettable, and found the singer resorting to basics. Hannah Mylrea of NME wrote that the album comprises lackluster imitations and fillers, devoid of the catchy hooks and couplets of Perry's older records. Writing for Clash, Joe Rivers felt Smile lacked substance, and called the production outdated.

== Commercial performance ==
Smile debuted at number five on the US Billboard 200 chart, marking Perry's fifth top-10 album and her first album since One of the Boys (2008) to not reach number one. It opened with 50,000 album-equivalent units, of which 35,000 were pure sales, 14,000 were streaming-equivalent units (translating to 21 million on-demand streams) and 2,000 track-equivalent units. Smile fell 49 spots to number 54 in its second week, and placed at number 104 in the third week. According to Luminate, Smile has sold 67,000 pure copies and accumulated 402,000 album units in the United States as of March 2021. In July 2024, the album was certified Gold by the Recording Industry Association of America (RIAA) for selling 500,000 album-equivalent units.

Smile opened at number five on the UK Album Charts for the week ending September 10, 2020, with 8,579 units sold. The album also entered at number nine on the Irish Albums Chart, marking Perry's fifth consecutive top-10 album in Ireland. Elsewhere, Smile reached the top five in Australia, Belgium (Wallonia), Canada, New Zealand, Portugal, Scotland, and Spain. The album has been certified Platinum in Canada and Norway. As of September 2024, Smile has garnered over four billion cumulative streams from various digital platforms.

== Track listing ==
Standard edition
No.	Title	Writer(s)	Producer(s)	Length
1.	"Never Really Over"	Katy Perry; Anton Zaslavski; Daniel James; Leah Haywood; Hayley Warner; Gino Barletta; Dagny Norvoll Sandvik; Jason Gill; Michelle Buzz	Zedd; Dreamlab	3:43
2.	"Cry About It Later"	Perry; Oscar Holter; Noonie Bao; Sasha Sloan	Holter; Peter Karlsson^{[b]}	3:10
3.	"Teary Eyes"	Perry; Jacob Kasher Hindlin; Michael Pollack; Andrew Goldstein; Madison Love	Goldstein^{[a]}; Oscar Görres	3:02
4.	"Daisies"	Perry; Jonathan Bellion; Hindlin; Pollack; Jordan K. Johnson; Stefan Johnson	The Monsters & Strangerz^{[a]}; Gian Stone^{[b]}	2:54
5.	"Resilient"	Perry; Tor Erik Hermansen; Mikkel Storleer Eriksen; Ferras Alqaisi	Stargate	3:07
6.	"Not the End of the World"	Perry; Hindlin; Pollack; Goldstein; Love	Goldstein^{[a]}; Görres	2:58
7.	"Smile"	Perry; Josh Abraham; Oliver Goldstein; Brittany "Starrah" Hazzard; Alqaisi; Benny Golson; Kier Gist; Anthony Criss; Vincent Brown	Abraham; Oligee; G Koop^{[c]}	2:46
8.	"Champagne Problems"	Perry; Johan Carlsson; John Ryan; Hindlin; Ian Kirkpatrick	Carlsson; Ryan; Karlsson^{[b]}	3:16
9.	"Tucked"	Perry; Carlsson; Ryan; Hindlin; Alqaisi	Carlsson; Ryan; Karlsson^{[b]}	3:07
10.	"Harleys in Hawaii"	Perry; Charlie Puth; Carlsson; Hindlin	Carlsson; Puth; Karlsson^{[b]}	3:05
11.	"Only Love"	Perry; Andrew Jackson; Sophie "Frances" Cooke	John DeBold^{[a]}; Svend Lerche^{[b]}	3:18
12.	"What Makes a Woman"	Perry; Carlsson; Ryan; Hindlin; Sarah Hudson	Carlsson^{[a]}; Elvira Anderfjärd^{[d]}; Karlsson^{[b]}	2:11
Total length:				36:36

Target edition
No.	Title	Writer(s)	Producer(s)	Length
13.	"Message from Katy"			3:31
14.	"High on Your Supply"	Perry; Ilya Salmanzadeh; Alqaisi; Savan Kotecha	Ilya^{[a]}; Karlsson^{[b]}	4:00
Total length:				44:07

Fan edition
No.	Title	Writer(s)	Producer(s)	Length
13.	"Small Talk"	Perry; Carlsson; Puth; Hindlin	Carlsson; Puth; Karlsson^{[b]}	2:41
14.	"Never Worn White"	Perry; Carlsson; Ryan; Hindlin	Carlsson; Karlsson^{[b]}	3:45
15.	"Daisies" (acoustic)	Perry; Bellion; Hindlin; Pollack; J. Johnson; S. Johnson	The Monsters & Strangerz^{[a]}; Stone^{[b]}	3:05
16.	"Daisies" (Oliver Heldens remix)	Perry; Bellion; Hindlin; Pollack; J. Johnson; S. Johnson	The Monsters & Strangerz^{[a]}; Stone^{[b]}; Oliver Heldens^{[e]}	3:35
Total length:				49:42

=== Notes ===
- ^{^[a]} signifies a main and vocal producer
- ^{^[b]} signifies a vocal producer
- ^{^[c]} signifies an additional producer
- ^{^[d]} signifies a co-producer
- ^{^[e]} signifies a producer for the remixed version
- Many LP pressings of the album include an alternative version of "Smile" featuring Diddy, with a duration of 3:00, with additional writers Sean Combs and Cordae Dunston, that appears in place of the solo version.
- Japanese CD edition includes all tracks from Target and Fan edition.

=== Sample credits ===
- "Never Really Over" contains interpolations from "Love You Like That", written by Dagny Sandvik, Jason Gill, Michelle Buzz.
- "Not the End of the World" contains elements from "Na Na Hey Hey Kiss Him Goodbye", written by Paul Leka, Gary DeCarlo, Dale Frashuer.
- "Smile" contains samples from "Jamboree", written by Benny Golson, Kier Gist, Anthony Criss, Vincent Brown.

== Personnel ==
Credits were adapted from the album liner notes.

=== Performance ===
- Katy Perry – vocals (all tracks), background vocals (2)
- Leah Haywood – background vocals (1)
- Hayley Warner – background vocals (1)
- Gino Barletta – background vocals (1)
- Sasha Alex Sloan – background vocals (2)
- Noonie Bao – background vocals (2)
- Andrew Goldstein – background vocals (3)
- Jacob Kasher Hindlin – background vocals (3)
- Michael Pollack – background vocals (3, 6)
- Madison Love – background vocals (3, 6)
- Jon Bellion – background vocals (4)
- Kamaria Anita Ousley – background vocals (7)
- Charlie Puth – background vocals (10, 15)
- Johan Carlsson – background vocals (10)
- Sophie Frances Cooke – background vocals (11)
- Ilya Salmanzadeh – background vocals (14)
- Savan Kotecha – background vocals (14)
- Sachi DiSerafino – gang vocals (11)
- Lila Drew – gang vocals (11)
- Karissa Reynafarje – gang vocals (11)
- John DeBold – gang vocals (11)
- Elvira Anderfjärd – background vocals (12)

=== Musicians ===
- Oscar Holter – drums, bass, keyboards (2)
- Rickard Göransson – guitars (2)
- Andrew Goldstein – guitars, drums, bass, percussion (3); keyboards (3, 6)
- Oscar Görres – drums, bass, percussion (3); keyboards (3, 6)
- Michael Pollack – synthesizers (3), guitars (4), piano (6)
- Pierre Luc Rioux – guitars (4, 17)
- Mikkel S. Eriksen – all instruments (5)
- Tor Hermansen – all instruments (5)
- Lincoln Adler – saxophone (7)
- Dave Richards – trumpet (7)
- David Bukovinszky – cello (8, 16)
- Johan Carlsson – keyboards (8, 9), strings arrangement (8), guitars (10, 15), Fender Rhodes (10), acoustic guitar, shaker, electric guitar (12); synthesizers (12, 15), talking, drum programming (15); piano (16)
- Mattias Bylund – string synthesizer (8), horns arrangement, synthesizer horns (9); strings, strings arrangement (16)
- Nils–Petter Ankarblom – string synthesizer, strings arrangement (8); horns arrangement (9)
- Mattias Johansson – violin (8, 16)
- Tomas Jonsson – tenor saxophone, baritone saxophone (9)
- Peter Noos Johansson – trombone, tuba (9)
- Magnus Johansson – trumpets (9)
- Janne Bjerger – trumpets (9)
- Wojtek Goral – alto saxophone (9)
- Charlie Puth – synthesizers (10, 15)
- Brad Oberhofer – Rhodes, organ, piano (11)
- John DeBold – guitar, synthesizers, arrangement, vocal chops (11)
- Elvira Anderfjärd – electric guitar, organ, bass, drums, (12)
- John Ryan – electric guitar (12)
- Ilya – arrangement, keyboards, bass, drums, percussion (14)
- Ferras – keyboards (14)

=== Technical ===
- Dave Kutch – mastering
- Oliver Heldens – mastering (18)
- Zedd – mixing (1)
- Serban Ghenea – mixing (2–6, 8–12, 14, 16, 17)
- Manny Marroquin – mixing (7)
- Phil Tan – mixing (15)
- Ryan Shanahan – engineering, additional mixing (1)
- Brian Cruz – assistant engineering (1)
- Sam Holland – engineering (2, 8–10, 12, 14–16)
- Cory Bice – engineering (2, 8–10, 12, 14, 16)
- Jeremy Lertola – engineering (2, 8–10, 12, 14, 16), assistant recording engineering (15)
- John Hanes – mix engineering (2–6, 8–12, 14, 16, 17)
- Rachael Findlen – engineering (3, 4, 6, 8, 10, 15, 17)
- Andrew Goldstein – vocals recording (3, 6)
- The Monsters & Strangerz – vocals recording (4)
- Mikkel S. Eriksen – engineering (5)
- Thomas Warren – engineering (5)
- Louie Gomez – engineering (7)
- Blake Harden – engineering (7)
- Clint “CJMIXEDIT” Badal – engineering (7)
- Darth "Denver" Moon – engineering (7)
- Chris Galland – mix engineering (7)
- Robin Florent – assistant engineering (7)
- Scott Desmarais – assistant engineering (7)
- Mattias Bylund – strings recording and editing (8), horns recording and editing (9)
- John DeBold – engineering (11)
- Bill Zimmerman – engineering (15)
- Peter Karlsson – vocal editing (15)
- Zedd – programming (1)
- Daniel James – programming (1)
- Leah Haywood – programming (1)
- Oscar Holter – programming (2)
- Andre Goldstein programming (3, 6)
- Oscar Görres – programming (3, 6)
- Mikkel S. Eriksen – programming (5)
- Tor Hermansen – programming (5)
- Johan Carlsson – programming (8–10, 12, 16), drum programming (15)
- Charlie Puth – programming (10), drum programming (15)
- John DeBold – drum programming, synthesizer programming, string programming (11)
- Elvira Anderfjärd – programming (12)
- Ilya – programming (14)
- Rami – programming (16)

=== Artwork ===
- Nicole Frantz – art direction
- Christine Hahn – photography
- Nick Steinhardt – design

== Charts ==
=== Weekly charts ===
Weekly chart performance for Smile
Chart (2020)	Peak position
Argentine Albums (CAPIF)	6
Australian Albums (ARIA)	2
Austrian Albums (Ö3 Austria)	8
Belgian Albums (Ultratop Flanders)	7
Belgian Albums (Ultratop Wallonia)	5
Canadian Albums (Billboard)	5
Croatian International Albums (HDU)	18
Czech Albums (ČNS IFPI)	35
Dutch Albums (Album Top 100)	13
Finnish Albums (Suomen virallinen lista)	18
French Albums (SNEP)	17
German Albums (Offizielle Top 100)	14
Greek Albums (IFPI)	47
Hungarian Albums (MAHASZ)	23
Irish Albums (Official Charts)	9
Italian Albums (FIMI)	10
Japan Hot Albums (Billboard Japan)	32
Japanese Albums (Oricon)	39
New Zealand Albums (RMNZ)	4
Norwegian Albums (VG-lista)	25
Polish Albums (ZPAV)	24
Portuguese Albums (AFP)	3
Scottish Albums (Official Charts)	3
Slovak Albums (ČNS IFPI)	28
South Korean Albums (Gaon)	98
Spanish Albums (Promusicae)	5
Swedish Albums (Sverigetopplistan)	58
Swiss Albums (Schweizer Hitparade)	8
UK Albums (Official Charts)	5
Uruguayan Albums (CUD)	10
US Billboard 200	5

=== Year-end charts ===
Year-end chart performance for Smile
Chart (2020)	Position
US Top Current Album Sales (Billboard)	86

== Certifications ==
Certifications for Smile
Region	Certification	Certified units/sales
Canada (Music Canada)	Platinum	80,000^{‡}
Finland	Gold	10,000
New Zealand (RMNZ)	Gold	7,500^{‡}
Norway (IFPI Norway)	Platinum	20,000^{‡}
Poland (ZPAV)	Gold	10,000^{‡}
United States (RIAA)	Gold	500,000^{‡}
^{‡} Sales+streaming figures based on certification alone.

== Release history ==
Release dates and formats for Smile
Region	Date	Format	Edition	Label	Ref.
Various	August 28, 2020	Cassette; CD; digital download; streaming; vinyl	Standard	Capitol	
Various	August 28, 2020	CD	Fan	Capitol	
Japan	August 28, 2020	CD	Japanese	Universal Music Japan	
United States	August 28, 2020	CD; vinyl	Target	Capitol	
