= Cry About It Later =

2020 song by Katy Perry

Song by Katy Perry

from the album Smile
- Released: August 28, 2020
- Recorded: 2018 (Note: Album version)
- Studio: House Mouse Studios (Stockholm, Sweden); MXM Studios (Stockholm, Sweden); MXM Studios (Los Angeles, CA); Secret Garden Studios (Montecito, CA)
- Genre: Pop
- Length: 3:09 (album version)
- Label: Capitol
- Songwriters: Katy Perry; Oscar Holter; Noonie Bao; Sasha Sloan
- Producer: Oscar Holter

Animated video
- "Cry About It Later" (The Smile Video Series) on YouTube

"Cry About It Later" is a song by American singer Katy Perry from her sixth studio album, Smile (2020). It is a mid-tempo break-up pop song written by Perry, Noonie Bao, Sasha Sloan, and the track's producer Oscar Holter. The song gatherned positive reviews from music commntary, with Holter's production being praised. However some critics pointed out how the next album track, "Teary Eyes", is identical in subject matter to "Cry About It Later" – postponement of sorrow in favor of short-term pleasure.

An accompanying animated video was published alongside Smile's release, on August 28, 2020. It features Perry playing a role of a witch who struggles to find love in men until she meets a woman at the end of the video. It was directed by Sykosan and animated by Future Power Station. Brazilian DJ Bruno Martini remixed the song, which also featured vocals from Brazilian singer Luísa Sonza. This version was released on April 23, 2021, accompanied by a Jay Sprogell-directed lyric video.

== Background and composition ==
"Cry About It Later" it's a sleeper in the way on the record. I've actually had that song for two and a half years and decided it was perfect for this record. It's really an unabashed kind of party song in some way it's a little bit like "you gotta get under someone to get over someone." And if you look at the track listing right, I did it in kind of a way where it tells a little bit of a story - it's not identical to my story. [Album] starts with "Never Really Over" and then you go to "Cry About It Later." It's like you know it's letting go of old love and then going to the club and then it continues on this emotional journey of [some sort of] rebirth and then ending with this strength of what makes a woman, so there's actually a little bit of a story line in the track listing of course.

— Perry, during an interview for Idolator.

"Cry About It Later" was written by Perry, Noonie Bao, Sasha Sloan, and song's producer Oscar Holter. The song was completed in early 2018 and it talks about accepting break-up and partying afterwards. It is a mid-tempo pop song written in D minor key. The song starts with the chorus backed-up by a minimalist beat, followed by a drop and Perry's first verse.

== Release and promotion ==
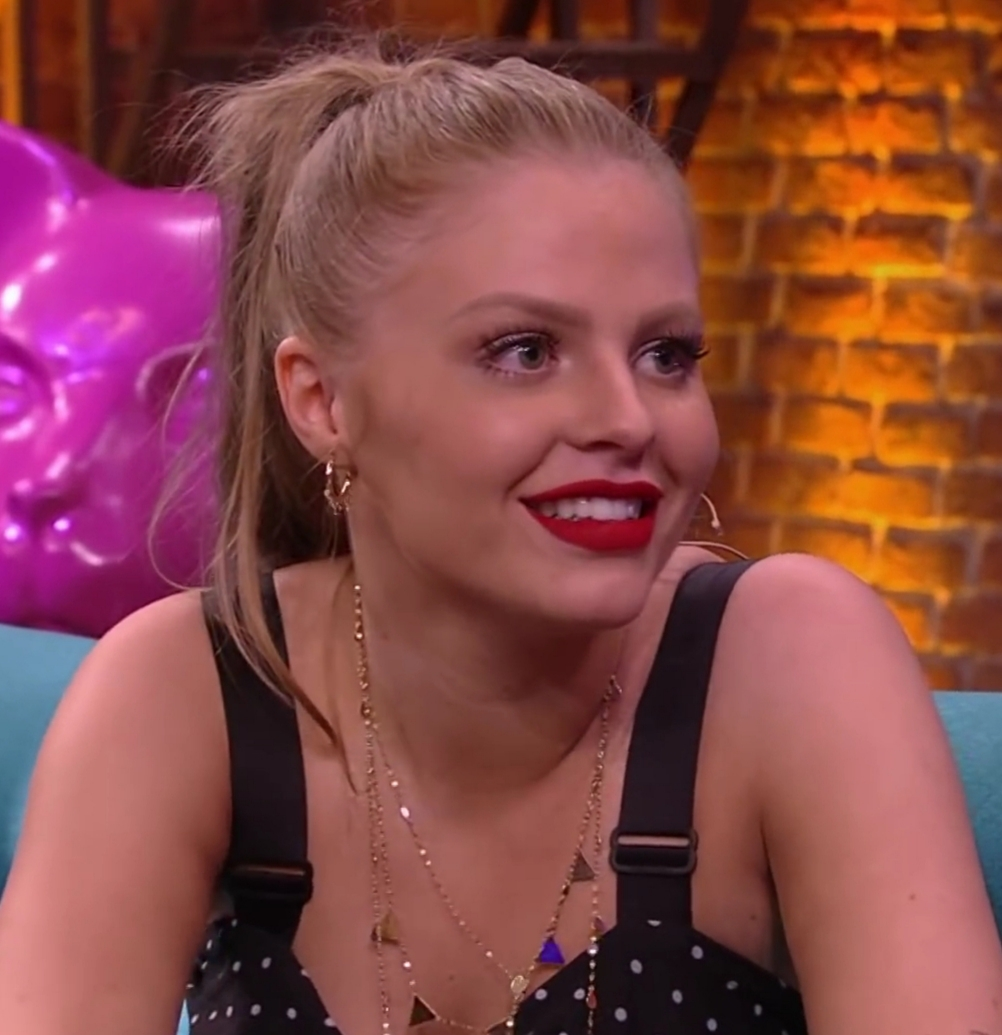
Luísa Sonza (pictured) is a featured vocalist in Bruno Martini remix of the song.

"Cry About It Later" was previewed by Perry during Smile Sunday Zoom live stream on August 9, 2020. It was released the same month, as a second track off Perry's sixth studio album, Smile. The track saw limited airplay tracktion in Australia and Russia. The song was later chosen to be the lead track on the singer's second compilation EP Scorpio SZN, which was issued October 26, 2020. The song was also included in her setlist at the Lazada Super Party in March 2021.

As part of The Smile Video Series, "Cry About It Later" received a visual on August 28, 2020. It has been animated by Future Power Station and directed by Sykosan. It shows a story of a woman who struggles to find a lover. She tries to make up with males, but in the end of the visual she falls in love with a female. Althea Legaspi of Rolling Stone saw it as a "new whimsical spin to the Cinderella story" writing "rather than being the damsel in distress, she embraces female empowerment." Billboard's Heran Mamo sees also a Dracula reference in the visual, with their conclusion on the video being "singer flips the script by shedding the damsel in distress trope to become the female heroine whose love interests follow no heteronormative happy endings."

=== Luísa Sonza and Bruno Martini remix ===
"Cry About It Later"

Promotional single by Katy Perry featuring Luísa Sonza and Bruno Martini
- Released: April 23, 2021
- Recorded: 2018–2021
- Genre: Pop
- Length: 2:39 (remix version)
- Label: Capitol
- Songwriters: Katy Perry; Oscar Holter; Noonie Bao; Sasha Sloan
- Producer: Oscar Holter

Lyric video (Note: Remix version)
- "Cry About It Later" on YouTube

On April 20, 2021, a potential collaboration between Perry and Luísa Sonza was hinted by the latter on Twitter, where she quoted the former's "I Kissed a Girl" title line. The remix of "Cry About It Later" was officially announced two days later featuring addition production from Bruno Martini and was set to be released on April 23, 2021. A lyric video for the remix was uploaded to Perry's YouTube channel on the same day and was directed by Jay Sprogell.

Sonza sings in English in this song's rendition, since both her and Martini came to the conclusion that they "chose to keep it in English," since "it is the language that the world speaks." It is second remix of the song of Perry's fifth studio album Smile featuring a Latin singer, following "Resilient," and it is second collaboration between Sonza and Martini. Talking about the remix, Bruno Martini said "It is hardly a remix. It sounds like another song, it has a completely different footprint than the original. It's really heavy, I'm excited to play it live soon."

== Critical reception ==
Emily Mackay of The Guardian called "Cry About It Later" "cool and sultry," however later she added that with "Teary Eyes" both songs feel "forgettable and anonymous." The New York Times's Lindsay Zoladz paired "Cry About It Later" with "Teary Eyes" and wrote about them that "there are also two consecutive songs about the well-worn pop tableau of crying on the dance floor," also calling latter song better offering than the first one. Among many other songs, Craig Jenkins from Vulture criticised the track since it "sell motivational boilerplate, waving away passing clouds but never describing what the storm felt like."

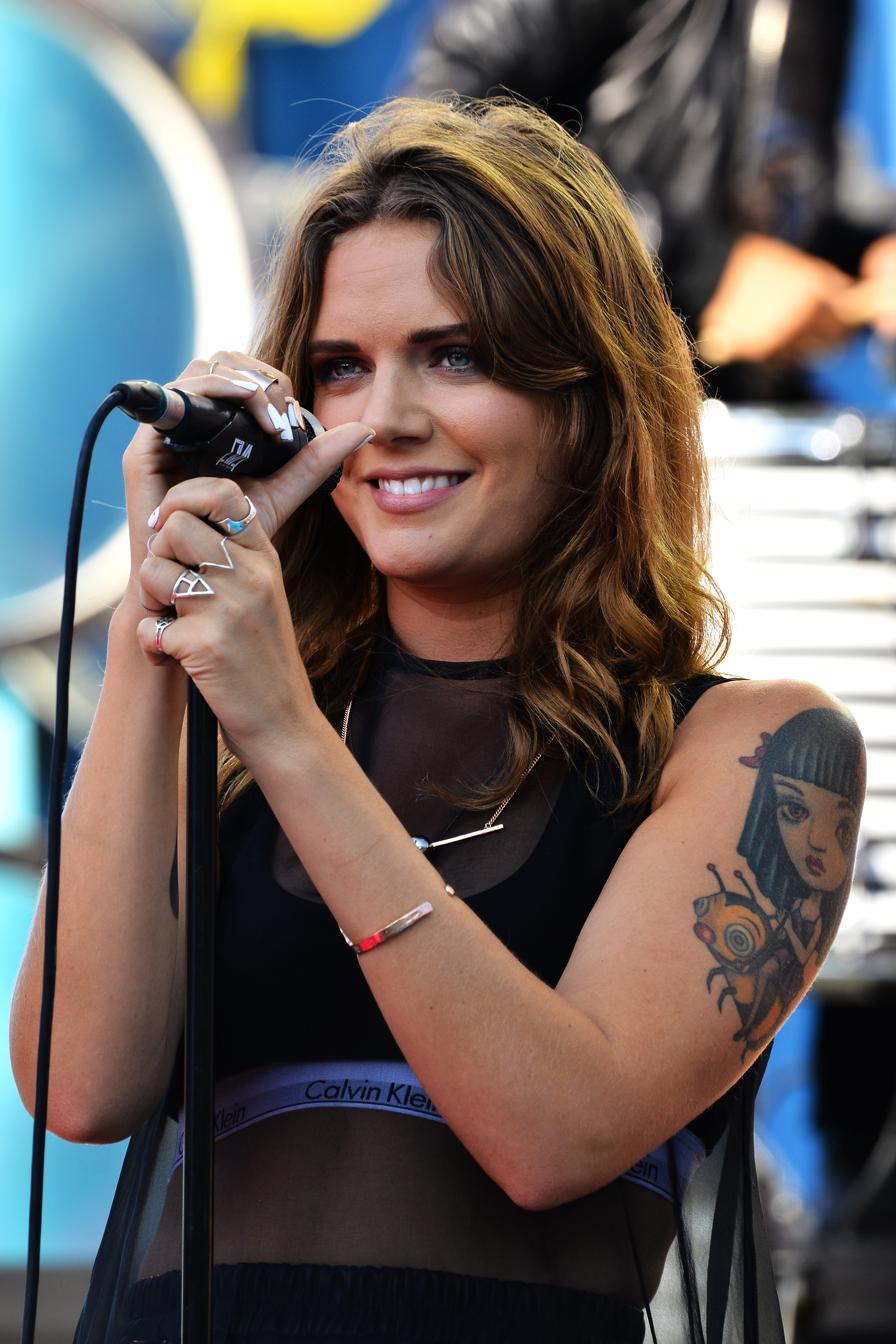
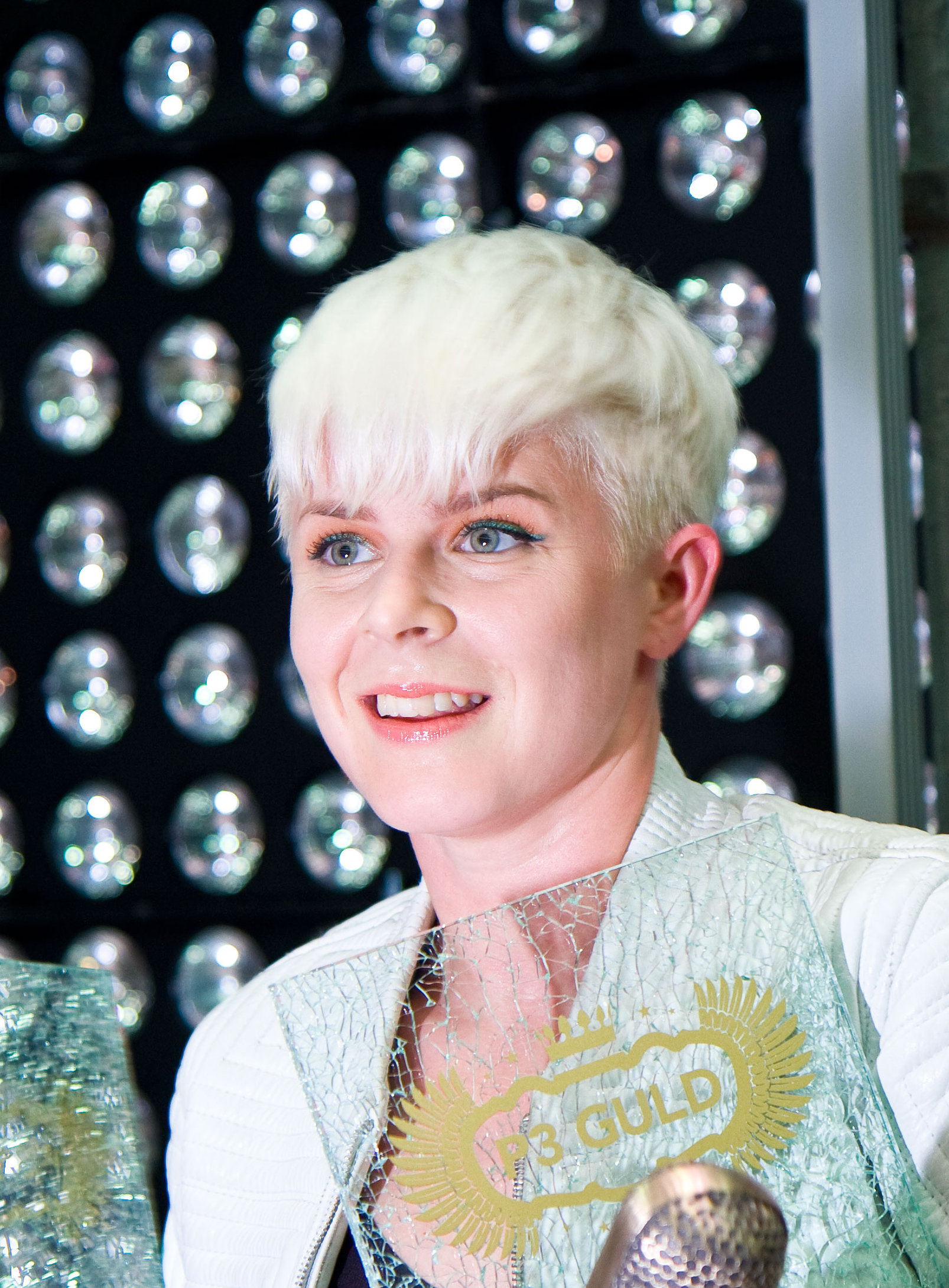
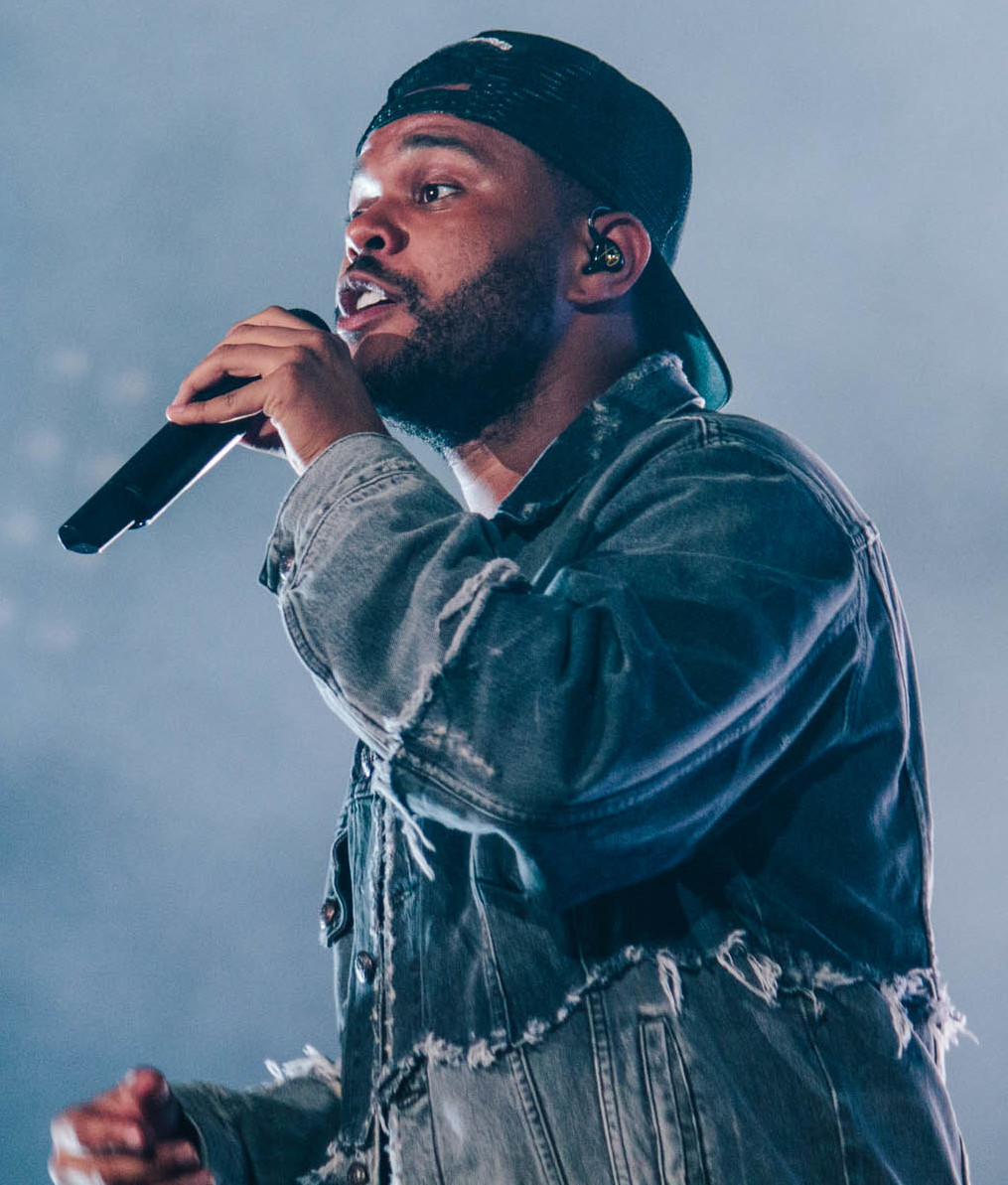
"Cry About It Later" was compared by some critics to work of singers Tove Lo (left), Robyn (center) and The Weeknd (right).

Nick Malone from PopMatters magazine compared the song to work of Tove Lo and Robyn saying it is "surprisingly dark, claustrophobic thriller about dancing one’s troubles away — but its distance from an essential Katy-Perry-ness gives it an odd fit." The Irish Times's Louise Bruton called it "the grown-up version of 2011's partially problematic "Last Friday Night (T.G.I.F.)"," which "instead of having so much fun that she blacks out, she channels the coldness of boozing to forget." Chris Deville from Stereogum said that the track "bobs and thumps like a scrawnier Imagine Dragons." Commenting on Oscar Holter's production, Alexa Camp of Slant Magazine said "the same rollicking freneticism he and Max Martin brought to the Weeknd's "Blinding Lights"."

Writing for Insider Callie Ahlgrim stated that they like the song, later adding "the song does try a little too hard to be anthemic, but I don't see myself pressing "next" if it were to come on shuffle at a party," when Courtney Larocca called the track "derivative" since "the isolation of Perry's voice, followed by a beat drop at the start of the song is a trick as old as EDM." She also added that "Cry About It Later" "doesn't elicit any sort of emotional response," explaining that "a true crying-in-the-club anthem revels in its devastation without being overtly explicit about it; the weight of the lyrics are meant to cause a pulsing ache in your chest as the production swells to a climax."

Andrea Dresdale from ABC News Radio talking about release of the song within Scorpio SZN EP said that "it's not spooky, but it is about partying all night, with angel wings and a devil's grin." Helen Brown of The Independent called the song "echoey meanderballad." Idolator's Mike Wass called the song "slinky bop," while calling Oscar Holter's synths "'80-s evoking." He also included "Cry About It Later" in his list of songs that should have been singles from 2020.

== Track listing ==
Digital download / streaming

1. "Cry About It Later" (feat. Luísa Sonza and Bruno Martini) [Luísa Sonza and Bruno Martini remix] – 2:39

== Credits and personnel ==
Credits adapted from Tidal.

- Katy Perry – vocals, backing vocals, songwriting
- Luísa Sonza – vocals, featured artist
- Bruno Martini – remixer, featured artist, programming, studio personnel
- Oscar Holter – songwriting, production, bass guitar, drums, keyboards, programming
- Noonie Bao – backing vocals, songwriting
- Sasha Sloan – backing vocals, songwriting
- Peter Karlsson – vocal production
- Rickard Goransson – guitar
- Cory Bice – engineering, studio personnel
- Jeremy Lertola – engineering, studio personnel
- Sam Holland – engineering, studio personnel
- John Hanes – mixing engineering, studio personnel
- Serban Ghenea – mixing, studio personnel
- Dave Kutch – mastering, studio personnel
- Chris Anokute – A&R
- Lauren Glucksman – A&R

== Charts ==
Weekly chart performance for "Cry About It Later"
Chart (2020)	Peak position
Hot Canadian Digital Song Sales (Billboard)	34
France (SNEP Sales Chart)	125
New Zealand Hot Singles (RMNZ)	8
Venezuela Anglo (Record Report)	34
UK Singles Downloads (OCC)	95

Weekly chart performance for "Cry About It Later (Luísa Sonza and Bruno Martini remix)"
Chart (2021)	Peak position
New Zealand Hot Singles (RMNZ)	40

== Certifications ==
Certifications for "Cry About It Later"
Region	Certification	Certified units/sales
Brazil (Pro-Música Brasil)	2× Platinum	80,000^{‡}
^{‡} Sales+streaming figures based on certification alone.

== Release history ==
Release dates and formats for "Cry About It Later (Luísa Sonza and Bruno Martini remix)"
Region	Date	Format	Label	Ref.
Various	April 23, 2021	Digital download; streaming	Capitol	
