= Not the End of the World (song) =

2020 song by Katy Perry

Song by Katy Perry

from the album Smile
- Studio: Unsub Studios (Los Angeles, California); Orange Grove Studio (Hollywood, California); House Mouse Studios (Stockholm, Sweden)
- Genre: Techno-pop; trap-pop
- Length: 2:58
- Label: Capitol
- Songwriters: Katy Perry; Jacob Kasher Hindlin; Michael Pollack; Andrew Goldstein; Madison Love
- Producers: Andrew Goldstein; Oscar Görres

Music video
- "Not the End of the World" on YouTube

"Not the End of the World" (Note: Alternatively known as "It's Not the End of the World".) is a song by American singer Katy Perry from her sixth studio album Smile (2020). It was written by the singer, Jacob Kasher Hindlin, Michael Pollack, Andrew Goldstein, and Madison Love, and was produced by Goldstein and Oscar Görres. Built off the interpolation of a melody from Steam's 1969 song "Na Na Hey Hey Kiss Him Goodbye", it is a techno-pop and trap-pop track with an underlying disco and techno beat. A self-empowerment cut, with the lyrics about positivity and Perry's indifference to her critics. Compared to her 2013 single "Dark Horse", the song left music commentary divided. Some of them depreciated the song's message in the context of the COVID-19 pandemic.

The music video features a group of blue-skinned aliens who worship Perry and want to kidnap her, but mistakenly abduct American actress Zooey Deschanel due to her resemblance to the singer. She is not recognized, and in order to save the planet, she plays along, pretending to be Perry by putting on her outfits and performing at the end. The song soundtracked Perry's post encouraging people to vote during the 2020 United States elections. "Not the End of the World" was performed during the T Mall Double 11 Gala and the concert residency Play (2021–2023).

== Background and release ==
When Katy Perry's fifth studio album, Witness, was released in 2017, it was met with a lukewarm reception. Due to that, the singer developed situational depression. Her experience with the condition influenced her next record, with "Not the End of the World" being an attempt to address her depression. After announcing in July 2020 how her then-upcoming album would be called Smile, she started the "Smile Sundays" livestream series leading up to its release. During the broadcasts, she unveiled various album tracks, including "Not the End of the World". The album was released on August 28, with "Not the End of the World" being its sixth track. A few days ahead of the great conjunction of 2020, Perry surprise-released her fifth compilation extended play Cosmic Energy on December 18, with "Not the End of the World" serving as its opening track. Three days later, the music video for the song was released.

== Development and composition ==
"Not the End of the World"
The 17-second sample of "Not the End of the World" following the end of staccato verse, when the interpolation of "Na Na Hey Hey Kiss Him Goodbye" can be heard. Perry decided to use elements of it after writing lyrics first.

"Not the End of the World" was written by Perry, Michael Pollack, Madison Love, Jacob Kasher Hindlin, and Andrew Goldstein. Production has been held by Oscar Görres and Goldstein, who also provided the track's instrumentation with keyboards and programming. The song's recording took place in Los Angeles-based Unsub Studios and Orange Grove Studio, with an additional session in House Mouse Studios in Stockholm, Sweden.

During the writing of "Not the End of the World", Perry matched its lyrics with a hook of pop rock band Steam's "Na Na Hey Hey Kiss Him Goodbye" (1969). The song is built over a disco and techno beats with a trap-influenced production. Compared to Perry's previous efforts Prism (2013) and Witness, especially to the former's third single "Dark Horse", it is a minor-key techno-pop and trap-pop song. The track features "anthemic" and "soaring" chorus followed by a drop and verses performed in staccato. Perry begins the track proclaiming "It's not the end of the world", and "pseudo-rap[s]" about positivity, detachment from criticism, staying strong, and not losing hope in the verses.

== Critical reception ==
"Not the End of the World" received mixed reviews from music critics. Idolator's Mike Wass called "Not the End of the World" a "Smile highlight" with an "addictive" use of melody from "Na Na Hey Hey Kiss Him Goodbye". Aynslee Darmon from Entertainment Tonight Canada said that the song is "perfect track to end 2020". Adriana Darcy of Young Hollywood praised how the song's "strong techno beats perfectly" complements its lyrics. In another positive review, MusicOMH's Chloe Johnson pairs it with the album's title track, she says that it is "easy to ignore the re-done theme", hence "euphoria chasing, action movie vibe" of the track is "deliciously attractive". Following the release of the Cosmic Energy EP, "Not the End of the World" was called one of her "most enlightening" songs in an article published by Pinkvilla, alongside "E.T." (2010) and "Wide Awake" (2012).

The lyrics were dubbed as "relat[able]" by Mike DeWald of Riff Magazine and "some of the most memorable on Smile" by Billboard's Jason Lipshutz. The News International reported that the fans endorsed the song's message during the COVID-19 pandemic. However, Joe Muggs from i newspaper made an argument that the track's "enjoy the ride" narrative is "out of place". Insider's Courteney Larocca commented: "I understand this song was probably made pre-pandemic, but that still doesn't excuse the decision to release it." Writing for PopMatters, Nick Malone described the lyrics as "too saccharine to hold any pathos", when he called whole "Not the End of the World" an "overly ambitious sister" of "Dark Horse".

Lindsay Zoladz of The New York Times called the song a "try-hard anthem", with The Guardian's Emily Mackay opining that it "feels forgettable and anonymous". Writing for Vulture, Craig Jenkins commented that "Not the End of the World" is one of many songs from Smile which "sell motivational boilerplate, waving away passing clouds but never describing what the storm felt like". Leah Greenblatt from Entertainment Weekly paired the song with its preceding album track "Resilient", saying that they "offer turn-that-frown-upside-down bromides for the mildly depressed". The Independent's Helen Brown called "Not the End of the World" one of "low points" of an album, while USA Today's Patrick Ryan labelled it as its "filler" which is full of "empowerment clichés".

Hannah Mylrea from NME criticized the song for being a "radio fodder, adopting trendy production techniques to gloss over a lack of substance". On a similar note, Callie Ahlgrim of Insider wrote that the song is "supremely tone-deaf", "more formulaic than fun and more radio-thirsty than compelling", and that the interpolation of "Na Na Hey Hey Kiss Him Goodbye" is "confusing". Alexa Camp of Slant Magazine stated that the track's "success" only comes from its similarities to "Dark Horse" and interpolation in its hook. In his ranking of Smile tracks, Lipshutz placed the song at the last, twelfth place, arguing that its production and usage of melody from "Na Na Hey Hey Kiss Him Goodbye" does not fit the record.

== Music video ==
=== Background and release ===
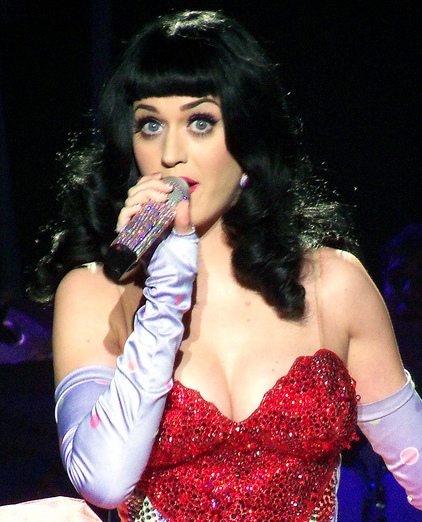
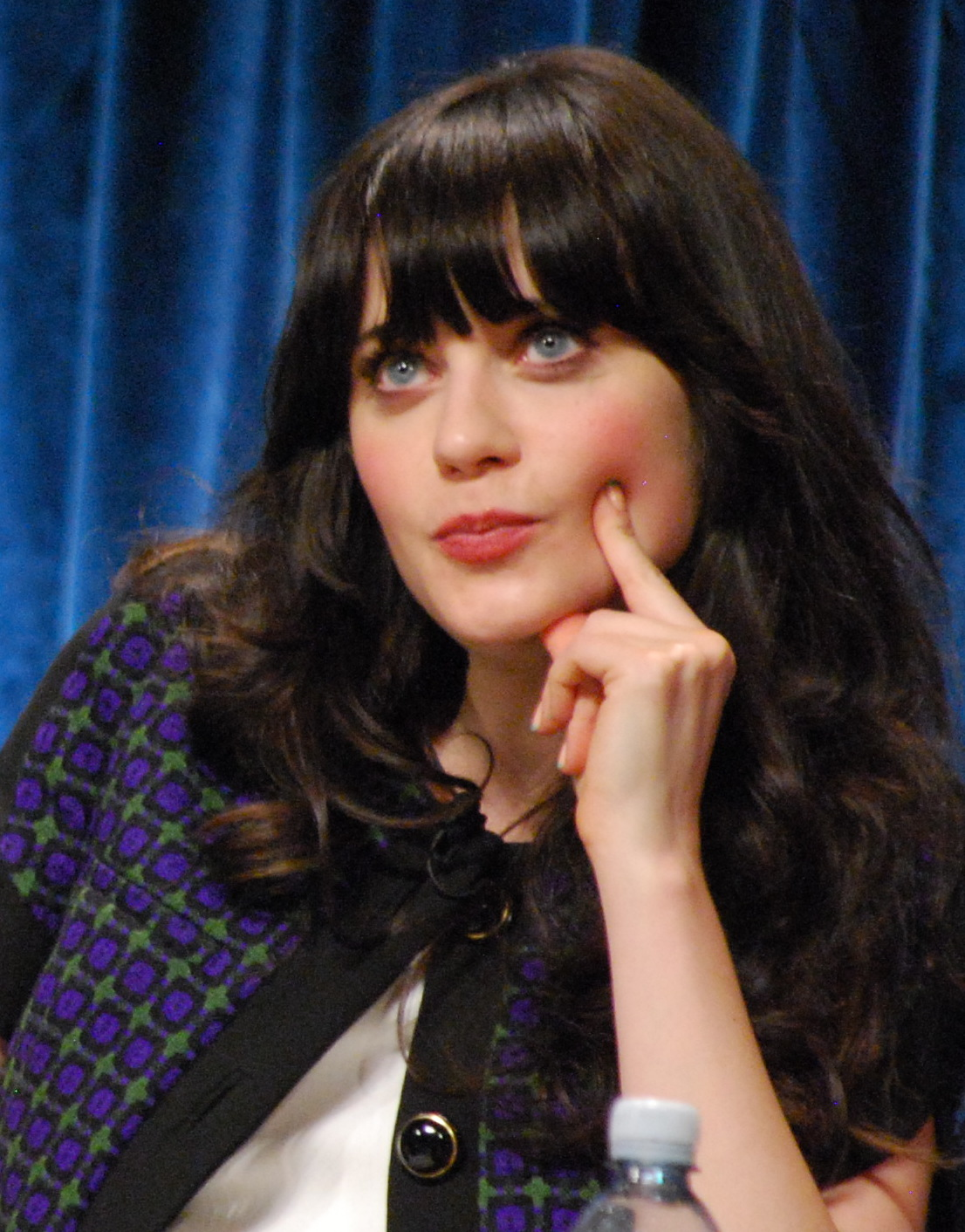
The physical similarities between Katy Perry (left) and Zooey Deschanel (right) served as a basis for the "Not the End of the World" music video.

Following the release of Smile, Perry recalled the demand for a "Not the End of the World" video from her fans. However, due to the recent birth of her daughter, the singer was unable to take part in any shooting. During her maternity leave, she envisioned a visual starring her doppelgänger, American actress and singer Zooey Deschanel. The music video was directed by duo Similar but Different and filmed in October 2020. Perry announced it a day before its release by sharing a two-second snippet of the video. The clip debuted on her official YouTube channel on December 21. The following day, fellow American singer-songwriter Taylor Swift called the clip "genius".

To further promote the video's release, Perry went live on Instagram, where she was joined by Deschanel. She talked with Deschanel about how she took advantage of their similar appearances after moving to Los Angeles in 2002. She recalled: "When I came to LA, I was pretty much a nobody, and you were like just getting so huge at that time, it was like Zooey Deschanel ran the world at that particular moment. Your star was really being born. You have always been everything to me, but in that moment, I was so complimented to look like you. But I have to admit something to you on a Live: When I first got to L.A., I went to the club a lot. And I wanted to get into the club, and I had no money, and I had no clout, I had nothing, and sometimes I would pose as you to get into the club." During the end of the live, Bob Roth of David Lynch Foundation joined it to discuss transcendental meditation and mental health.

=== Synopsis ===
In the video, the Earth is set to be destroyed. The clip begins with a scene in which Deschanel reads a newspaper while Perry passes by with baby pram in an Unsub Records cap. Blue-skinned aliens, who are obsessed with the singer, want to abduct her to save her from the planet's destruction. Deschanel is mistakenly taken by aliens, who think that she is Perry, even though she is unsuccessfully trying to explain to them that she is not. She is teleported to their flying vessel, where she is introduced to the alien's captain. Later on, she is getting dressed in Perry's outfits from her earlier eras, including costumes from Teenage Dream era. Additionally, outfits taken from "California Gurls" (2010) and "Roar" (2013) music videos, as well as the Smile photoshoot can be seen in the background. Deschanel later asks the two aliens who abducted her to help her save the Earth. This is accomplished at the end of the video by unplugging the Earth's internet. The video ends with Deschanel wearing a blonde wig, lip syncing the last chorus of the song for a crowd of aliens.

== Live performances and usage in media ==
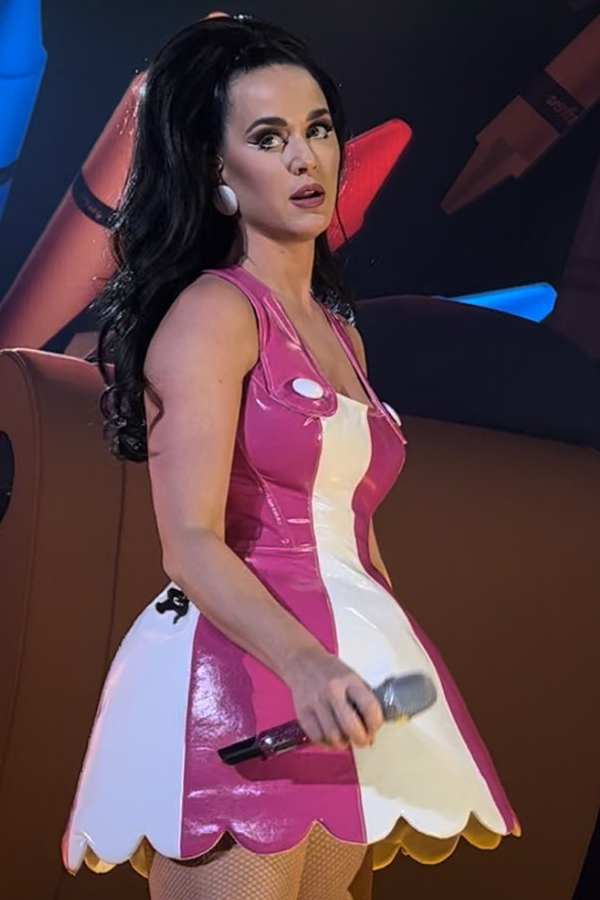
Perry performing "Not the End of the World" during her Play concert residency in December 2021

"Not the End of the World" was performed for the first time by Perry during the Chinese online shopping festival T Mall Double 11 Gala in November 2020, alongside "Never Really Over" and "Roar". Wass praised the gig, saying she "serv[ed] vocals and elaborate green-screen effects", adding that the singer is not receiving "enough" recognition for her "cutting-edge quarantine performances". Next year, she embarked on her first concert residency at Resorts World Las Vegas entitled Play (2021–23), and on the night before the first show she announced its set list, including "Not the End of the World". It was placed as the concluding track of the first act called Henry the Horror.

Coinciding with the 2020 MTV Video Music Awards ceremony on August 30, Perry shared a mirror selfie with her posing in a breast pumping bra and disposable postpartum underwear with "Not the End of the World" playing in the background. In November, she used the song in an Instagram post encouraging people to vote in the 2020 United States elections.

== Credits and personnel ==
These credits are adapted from the liner notes of Smile.

Recording locations

- Recorded at Unsub Studios (Los Angeles), Orange Grove Studio (Hollywood), and House Mouse Studios (Stockholm, Sweden)
- Mixed at MixStar Studios (Virginia Beach)
- Mastered at The Mastering Palace (New York)

Personnel

- Katy Perry – vocals, songwriting
- Andrew Goldstein – backing vocals, songwriting, production, vocal production, guitar, keyboard, programming, vocal engineering, studio personnel
- Oscar Görres – production, keyboards, programming
- Madison Love – backing vocals, songwriting
- Michael Pollack – backing vocals, songwriting, piano
- Jacob Kasher Hindlin – songwriting
- John Hanes – mixing engineering, studio personnel
- Serban Ghenea – mixing, studio personnel
- Dave Kutch – mastering, studio personnel
- Rachael Findlen – studio personnel
- Ashley Newton – A&R
- Chris Anokute – A&R
- Lauren Glucksman – A&R

== Certifications ==
Region	Certification	Certified units/sales
Brazil (Pro-Música Brasil)	Gold	20,000^{‡}
^{‡} Sales+streaming figures based on certification alone.
