= Only Love (Katy Perry song) =

2020 song by Katy Perry

Song by Katy Perry

from the album Smile
- Released: August 28, 2020
- Studio: Glendale Boulevard Swamp Studios (Los Angeles, CA); Heavy Duty Studios (Los Angeles, CA); Quarantine 805 (Santa Barbara, CA)
- Genre: Pop; gospel
- Length: 3:18
- Label: Capitol
- Songwriters: Katy Perry; Andrew Jackson; Sophie "Frances" Cooke
- Producer: John DeBold

Live video
- "Only Love" on YouTube

"Only Love" is a song by American singer-songwriter Katy Perry recorded for her sixth studio album Smile (2020). She co-wrote the track with Andrew Jackson and Sophie "Frances" Cooke, while John DeBold produced it with vocal production from Svend Lerche. The lyrics of the song focus on Perry reconciling with her parents. Upon the release of Smile, the song was positively received by music critics, and it would later be performed by Perry with Darius Rucker at the American Music Awards of 2020.

"This song "Only Love" that's on the record coming out talks about what happens if life were to hand us a curveball. How would you look at the things that are important? Will you re-prioritize? Would you reframe?".

—Katy Perry for NPR.

== Reception ==
Emily Mackay from The Guardian noted the song's "gospel-gilded 80s lustre" and commented how it lifts the energy of the album. Lindsay Zoladz from The New York Times described the song as "Amy Grant-style gospel pop", called its keyboard chords "openhearted". Callie Ahlgrim from Business Insider outlined that the song's "tender lyrics crystallize into something worth hearing" as "Perry navigates that chasm with grace and humility", while Courteney Larocca stated how "earnest appreciation for measuring life in love stays throughout the song".

== Live performances ==
On November 22, 2020, Perry performed "Only Love" for the first time live with Darius Rucker at the American Music Awards of 2020 at Microsoft Theater in Los Angeles, California. In the stripped back performance, they sang the verses back to back, with Rucker playing the guitar. She had a blonde bob and dressed casually in a denim jacket and jeans for the performance. Before it took place, Perry announced on Instagram sharing a childhood picture that the performance will be dedicated to her father, and wished that the performance will "spread a message of love and unity" to her fans. The performance was her first after giving birth the previous August. NBC dubbed it "an emotional rendition" of "the heartfelt song".
