= Never Worn White =

2020 single by Katy Perry

Single by Katy Perry
- Released: March 5, 2020
- Studio: MXM Studios (Los Angeles, CA); BLND Studios (Stockholm, Sweden)
- Genre: Pop
- Length: 3:45
- Label: Capitol
- Songwriters: Katy Perry; Johan Carlsson; John Ryan; Jacob Kasher Hindlin
- Producer: Johan Carlsson

Katy Perry singles chronology
"Harleys in Hawaii" (2019)	"Never Worn White" (2020)	"Daisies" (2020)

Music video
- "Never Worn White" on YouTube

"Never Worn White" is a song by the American singer-songwriter Katy Perry. It was released by Capitol Records as a standalone single on March 5, 2020. The song was released alongside a music video, in which Perry announced her pregnancy. "Never Worn White" was later included as a bonus track on the Japanese and fan editions of Perry's sixth studio album, Smile (2020).

== Composition ==
"Never Worn White" is a "powerhouse" piano-led ballad, with "graceful" production and a "heartfelt" chorus.

== Music video ==
The official music video for "Never Worn White" premiered alongside the song. It shows Perry alternately shown wearing a white dress and an elaborate dress of flowers as she sings the song. At the end of the video, Perry is shown cradling her abdomen, announcing her pregnancy.

== Commercial performance ==
"Never Worn White" entered charts in European countries, reaching number 97 in the United Kingdom and number 39 in Hungary. On the New Zealand Hot Singles Chart, "Never Worn White" debuted at number 12. The song did not chart on the Billboard Hot 100, but landed at number 12 on the Bubbling Under Hot 100.

== Credits and personnel ==
Credits adapted from Tidal.

- Katy Perry – vocals, songwriting
- Johan Carlsson – production, songwriting, programming, piano
- Jacob Kasher Hindlin – songwriting
- John Ryan – songwriting
- Peter Karlsson – vocal production
- Rami – programming
- David Bukovinszky – cello
- Mattias Bylund – string arrangement, strings
- Mattias Johansson – violin
- Cory Bice – engineering
- Jeremy Lertola – engineering
- Sam Holland – engineering
- Şerban Ghenea – mixing
- Dave Kutch – master engineering
- John Hanes – mix engineering

== Charts ==
Weekly chart performance for "Never Worn White"
Chart (2020)	Peak position
Australia (ARIA)	79
Belgium (Ultratip Bubbling Under Flanders)	25
Canada Hot 100 (Billboard)	95
Croatia (HRT)	78
France (SNEP Sales Chart)	109
Hungary (Single Top 40)	39
Ireland (IRMA)	85
Netherlands (Dutch Tipparade 40)	18
New Zealand Hot Singles (RMNZ)	12
Scottish Singles Sales (Official Charts)	46
UK Singles (Official Charts)	97
US Bubbling Under Hot 100 (Billboard)	12

== Certifications ==
Certifications for "Never Worn White"
Region	Certification	Certified units/sales
Brazil (Pro-Música Brasil)	Gold	20,000^{‡}
^{‡} Sales+streaming figures based on certification alone.

== Release history ==
Release formats for "Never Worn White"
Region	Date	Format(s)	Label	Ref.
Various	March 5, 2020	Digital download; streaming	Capitol	
Australia	March 6, 2020	Radio airplay	Capitol	
Italy	March 6, 2020	Radio airplay	Universal	
