= Alok (DJ) =

Brazilian DJ, record producer (born 1991)

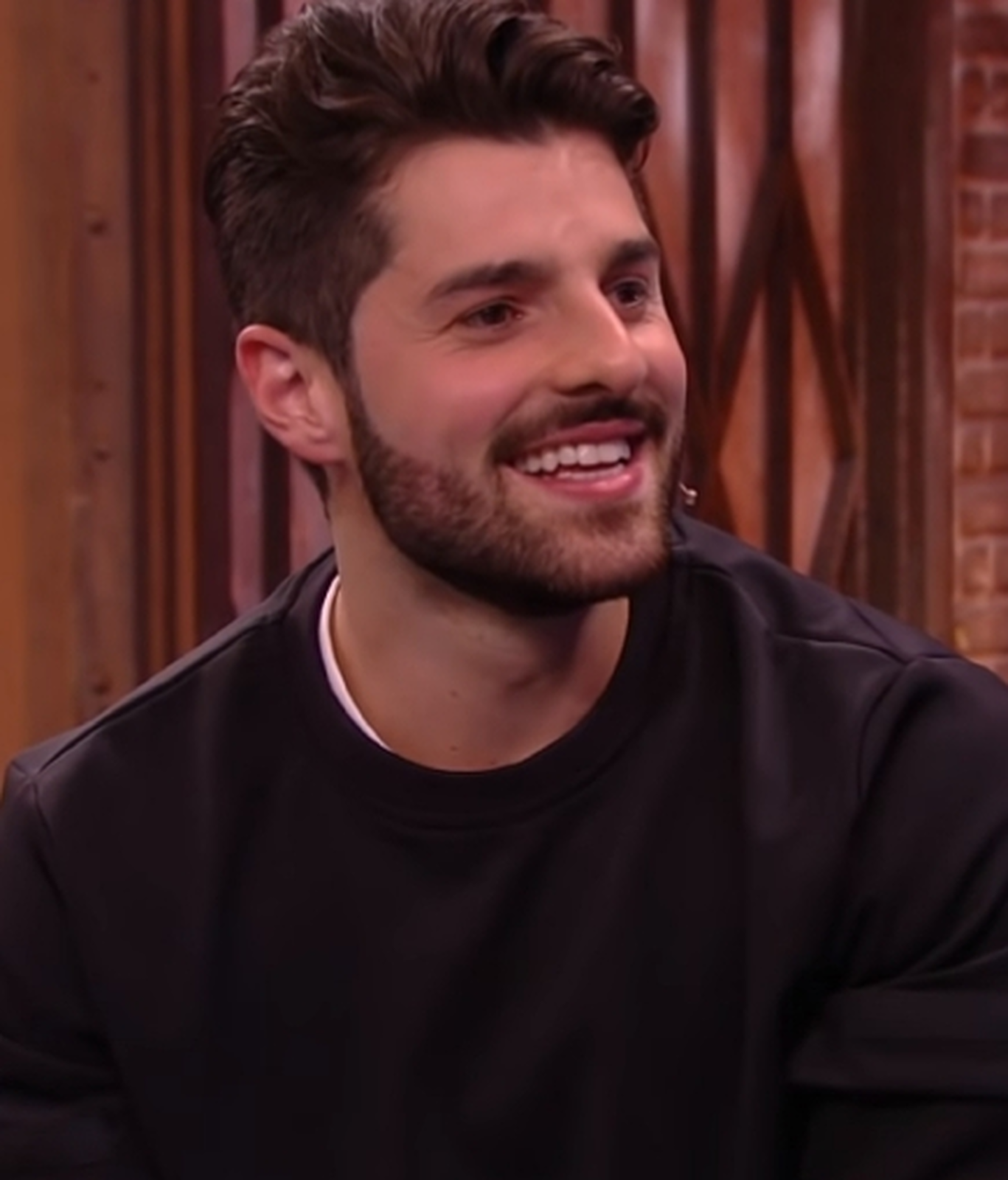
- Alok in 2020
- Born: Alok Achkar Peres Petrillo; 26 August 1991 (age 35); Goiânia, Goiás, Brazil
- Occupations: Musician; DJ; record producer
- Spouse: Romana Novais (m. 2019)
- Children: 2
- Musical career
- Genres: House; EDM; deep house; future house; Brazilian bass
- Instruments: Guitar; keyboards
- Years active: 2004–present
- Labels: Spinnin'; UP Club; Controversia; Warner Music
- Website: aloklive.com.br

Alok Achkar Peres Petrillo (Brazilian Portuguese pronunciation: [aˈlɔki]; born 26 August 1991), known mononymously as Alok, is a Brazilian musician, DJ, and record producer who is best known for his 2016 single "Hear Me Now". Since 2021, Alok was ranked the 4th best DJ in the world by DJ Mag for 4 consecutive years. In 2025, he achieved his highest placement to date, being named the third-best DJ in the world by the same publication.

Alok has become one of the most prominent icons in the Brazilian electronic scene, with honors and awards, such as "Best DJ in Brazil" by House Mag in 2014 and 2015, and being the only Brazilian in the top 25 in the world the following year by DJ Mag magazine. In 2017, he was elected by Forbes Brasil as one of the most influential people under the age of 30 in the country.

== Biography ==
Petrillo was born in Goiânia, Brazil, the son of DJs Swarup and Ekanta, who are also pioneers of psytrance in the country and creators of the Universo Paralello, electronic music festival in Bahia.

His name came after his parents travelled to India, where they met with spiritual guru Osho, who indicated that their child should be called Alok, which in the Sanskrit language means "light".

== Career ==
Alok began his career at the age of 12 along with his fraternal twin brother Bhaskar Petrillo. At age 19 he pursued a solo career, becoming one of the most prominent icons in the Brazilian electronic scene, with honors and awards, such as "Best DJ in Brazil" awarded by House Mag for two consecutive times (in the years 2014 and 2015) and the only Brazilian in the top 25 world DJ ranking by DJ Magazine in 2016.

At age 10 he began to learn to play, along with Bhaskar. In 2004, Petrillo and his brother visited the rehearsal studio of their father Swarup's band. According to Ekanta, his sons were interested in how the remixes were made. DJs Zumbi and Pedrão, family friends, taught the brothers to mix songs. Each one learned a specialty, one on the keyboard and the other on the guitar. Shortly thereafter, Dick Trevor installed the Logic Pro music editing program on Swarup's computer, bringing the brothers closer to producing music.

Petrillo and his brother attended the performances that their parents did at psytrance paries and soon created their first project, Logica.

Petrillo is also the founder of UP Club Records, a record label specializing in discovering new inborn talent in electronic music.

In November 2019, Alok Petrillo became a character of Garena Free Fire under his name Alok and Song released Vale Vale with Zafrir. in August 2021, according to in-game info from Garena Free Fire Alok is the most used character in game. Petrillo along with Dimitri Vegas & Like Mike & KSHMR released "Reunion" on Controversia & Smash The House for Free Fire's 4th anniversary.

== Record label ==
On 3 July 2019, Alok released a song called "The Wall" along with American DJ Sevenn as the first release from his record label Controversia, a label he created in partnership with Spinnin Records to release Brazilian bass music.

== Awards ==
Year	Award	Category	Work	Result
2016	International Dance Music Awards	Best Break-Through DJ	Himself	Nominated
2017	Meus Prêmios Nick	Hit of the Year in Brazil	Hear Me Now	Nominated
2017	Meus Prêmios Nick	Trendy Cat (Male)	Himself	Nominated
2017	Prêmio Jovem Brasileiro	Best show	Himself	Nominated
2017	MTV Europe Music Awards	Best Brazilian Act	Himself	Nominated
2017	MTV Millennial Awards	Best Dj	Himself	Nominated
2018	Prêmio Jovem Brasileiro	Hit of the year	Paga de Solteiro Feliz– Simone & Simaria	Nominated
2018	Meus Prêmios Nick	Trendy Cat (Male)	Himself	Won
2018	MTV Europe Music Awards	Best Brazilian Act	Himself	Nominated
2018	MTV Millennial Awards Brasil	Musical Artist	Himself	Nominated
2019	MTV Millennial Awards Brasil	Musical Artist	Himself	Nominated
2019	Prêmio Jovem Brasileiro	Best DJ	Himself	Won
2019	International Dance Music Awards	Best Male Artist (Pop/Electronic)	Himself	Nominated
2020	International Dance Music Awards	Best Remix	Piece of Your Heart	Won
2020	MTV Millennial Awards Brasil	DJ lanso a braba	Himself	Nominated
2020	MTV Millennial Awards Brasil	Live das Lives	Himself	Nominated

=== DJ Magazine Top 100 DJs ===
Year	Position	Notes	Ref.
2015	44	New Entry	
2016	25	Up 19	
2017	19	Up 6	
2018	13	Up 6	
2019	11	Up 2	
2020	5	Up 6	
2021	4	Up 1	
2022	4	No Change	
2023	4	No Change	
2024	4	No Change	
2025	3	Up 1	
