= Daisies (Katy Perry song) =

2020 single by Katy Perry

Single by Katy Perry

from the album Smile
- Written: 2020
- Released: May 15, 2020
- Recorded: 2020
- Studio: Unsub Studios (Los Angeles, California)
- Genre: Pop; electropop
- Length: 2:54
- Label: Capitol
- Songwriters: Katy Perry; Jonathan Bellion; Jacob Kasher Hindlin; Michael Pollack; Jordan K. Johnson; Stefan Johnson
- Producer: The Monsters & Strangerz

Katy Perry singles chronology
"Never Worn White" (2020)	"Daisies" (2020)	"Smile" (2020)

Music video
- "Daisies" on YouTube

"Daisies" is a song by the American singer-songwriter Katy Perry. It was released on May 15, 2020, by Capitol Records as the lead single from her sixth studio album, Smile (2020). The song was serviced to US adult contemporary and pop radio formats on May 18 and June 9, 2020, respectively. She co-wrote the track with Jon Bellion, Jacob Kasher Hindlin, Michael Pollack, and its producers Jordan K. Johnson and Stefan Johnson of the Monsters & Strangerz. It was written and recorded in 2020, and was recorded at Unsub Studios, based in Los Angeles, California.

Upon its release, "Daisies" was positively received by music critics. Commercially, it reached the top ten in Scotland and the Netherlands, the top 20 in Croatia and Hungary, and the top 30 in Ireland. The song also received multi-Platinum certification in Brazil, as well as Platinum certifications in Australia and Canada. It was promoted with a music video, alongside numerous remixes, including a special remix for the "Can't Cancel Pride" benefit concert, which was released alongside its own music video.

== Composition ==
"Daisies" is a pop and electropop song with acoustic guitars that runs for 2 minutes and 53 seconds. The track "celebrates the strength of the human spirit as it overcomes adversity". Perry said it took on a new meaning of revitalizing lost dreams discovered through the challenges of quarantine during the COVID-19 pandemic. During a Facebook live stream, the singer shared details about the song, saying, "It's a song for all of the dreams that you guys have been dreaming about, and all the things you want to achieve". When "Daisies" premiered, she also revealed on social media that the song was written "a couple of months ago as a call to remain true to the course you've set for yourself, regardless of what others may think". Its lyrics include "They told me I was out there / tried to knock me down / took those sticks and stones / showed 'em I can build a house / They told me I was crazy / But I'll never let 'em change me / 'til they cover me in daisies."

== Release ==
On May 7, 2020, Perry announced through social media that her upcoming sixth album's first single, entitled "Daisies", would be released on May 15, 2020. Its cover art was also posted that day, featuring Perry smiling in a field of yellow daisies. The following day, in a promotional campaign for "Daisies", coinciding with Mother's Day, a digital flower shop called "Katy's Daisies" which offers 12 free multicolored bouquet options to "tell someone you care, you love them, you miss them, or simply thank them for believing in you" was opened. A remix from MK followed on May 29, 2020.

== Critical reception ==
Alexa Camp of Slant Magazine described "Daisies" as an "atmospheric ballad". Brittany Spanos of Rolling Stone described the song as a "booming, empowering [...] bright track". Jem Aswad of Variety called the song a "Firework"-style slow burner that shows off how far she's come as a singer". Vulture contributor Chris Murphy also praised the song, calling it a "pretty good" acoustic-guitar-driven pop song. Jessica Castillo, editor of Teen Vogue, praised the song's themes of self-esteem and inspiration, concluding that "Daisies" is "a perfect reminder to stay your path and pay no mind to people who doubt you". Kate Solomon of The Guardian wrote that "this song is basically "Unconditionally" and "Tsunami" and every other power ballad [Perry]'s ever done".

== Commercial performance ==
"Daisies" debuted at number 40 on the US Billboard Hot 100, giving Perry her 25th top 40 song in the country. It also reached number three on the US Digital Song Sales chart. On the Adult Top 40 chart, "Daisies" became Perry's 16th top-ten single, charting at 9, becoming her highest-charting entry on the chart since "Chained to the Rhythm" (2017). By having 16 songs reaching the top ten, Perry became the fifth artist with the most top-ten songs on the chart and has been certified Gold by the Recording Industry Association of America for equivalent sales of 500,000 units in the United States.

Elsewhere, the song peaked at number 37 on the UK Official Charts Company, and on number six on the UK Singles Downloads Chart. The song has reached number 33 on the Canadian Hot 100 chart. It peaked at number 4 on the Spanish Sales Chart, Perry's highest-charting single since appearing on Calvin Harris's 2017 single "Feels" with Pharrell Williams and Big Sean. It reached higher peaks on other charts, including number 4 on Scotland, number 2 on the Ultratip Belgium chart, 12 in Croatia and 3 on New Zealand Hot Singles.

== Promotion ==
=== Live performances ===
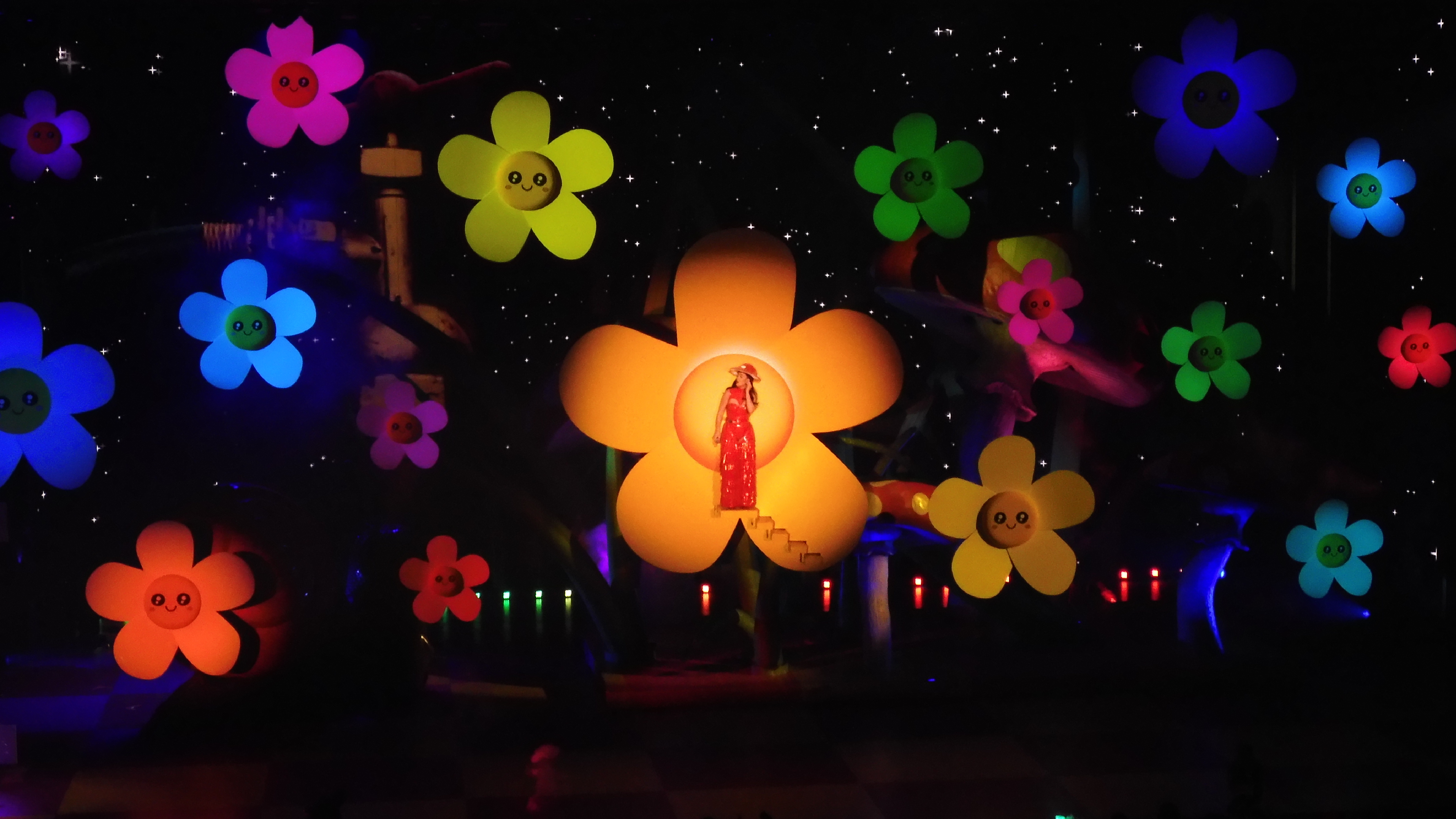
Perry performing "Daises" during her residency Play

On May 15, 2020, Perry performed a stripped-down take of "Daisies" and participated in a Q&A with fans on Amazon Music's weekly Friday Live performance series. She also performed the song on Houseparty's "In the House" event on the same day.

The first televised performance of the song occurred during the eighteenth season finale of American Idol on May 17, 2020; the performance utilized mixed reality technology, using a soundstage in Los Angeles equipped with LED screens and augmented reality graphics to allow Perry to see and interact with a digital environment in real-time (rather than using chromakey). On May 22, 2020, Perry performed live on Good Morning America, kicking off Good Morning America's 2020 Concert Series. She also sang "Daisies" along with "Firework" on YouTube's Dear Class of 2020 event. Perry also performed a deep house remix virtually for the "Can't Cancel Pride" benefit concert on June 26, 2020.

=== Music videos ===
A music video, directed by Liza Voloshin and shot on super 8 film, was released along with the single on May 15, 2020. She later revealed that the music video was not what was originally planned, but due to the COVID-19 pandemic, the initial shoot set to happen on March 13, 2020, was cancelled.

In support of LGBT Pride, Perry released an alternative video titled "Daisies (Can't Cancel Pride)" on June 26, 2020. The video uses the deep house remix of "Daisies" by Oliver Heldens and is a recording of Perry performing the song virtually at the Can't Cancel Pride benefit concert. This remix also interpolates lines from her back catalogue of songs including: "I Kissed a Girl", "Peacock", "Walking on Air" and "Swish Swish".

== Awards and nominations ==
Year	Organization	Award	Result	Ref.
2020	UMI Yearlies	Song of the Year	Won	

== Track listing ==
Digital download and streaming

1. "Daisies" – 2:53

Digital download and streaming (MK remix)

1. "Daisies" (MK remix) – 3:34

Digital download and streaming (Oliver Heldens remix)

1. "Daisies" (Oliver Heldens remix) – 3:35

Digital download and streaming (acoustic)

1. "Daisies" (acoustic) – 3:05

7-inch vinyl

- Side A – "Daisies" – 2:53
- Side B – "Daisies" (instrumental) – 2:53

== Credits and personnel ==
- Katy Perry – lead vocals, songwriter
- Jonathon Bellion – songwriter, associated performer, background vocals
- Rachel Findlen – engineer
- John Hanes – mixing engineer
- Jacob Kasher Hindlin – songwriter
- Jordan K. Johnson – songwriter
- Stefan Johnson – songwriter
- Dave Kutch – mastering engineer
- Michael Pollack – songwriter, associated performer, guitar
- Pierre-Luc Rioux – associated performer, guitar
- Gian Stone – vocal producer
- The Monsters & Strangerz – producers, associated performers, vocal engineers, vocal producers

Credits adapted from album liner notes.

== Charts ==
=== Weekly charts ===
Weekly chart performance for "Daisies"
Chart (2020)	Peak position
Australia (ARIA)	37
Austria (Ö3 Austria Top 40)	64
Belgium (Ultratip Bubbling Under Flanders)	2
Belgium (Ultratip Bubbling Under Wallonia)	33
Canada Hot 100 (Billboard)	37
Canada AC (Billboard)	28
Canada CHR/Top 40 (Billboard)	48
Canada Hot AC (Billboard)	24
Czech Republic Singles Digital (ČNS IFPI)	68
Croatia (HRT)	12
Euro Digital Song Sales (Billboard)	6
France (SNEP Sales Chart)	17
Greece (IFPI)	49
Hungary (Rádiós Top 40)	19
Hungary (Single Top 40)	23
Ireland (IRMA)	27
Italy (FIMI)	70
Japan Hot Overseas (Billboard)	12
Lithuania (AGATA)	46
Netherlands (Dutch Tipparade)	10
Netherlands (Single Tip)	7
New Zealand Hot Singles (RMNZ)	3
Scottish Singles Sales (Official Charts)	4
Slovakia Singles Digital (ČNS IFPI)	74
Spain Digital Song Sales (Billboard)	4
Sweden Heatseeker (Sverigetopplistan)	10
Switzerland (Schweizer Hitparade)	57
UK Singles (Official Charts)	37
US Billboard Hot 100	40
US Adult Contemporary (Billboard)	11
US Adult Pop Airplay (Billboard)	9
US Dance Airplay (Billboard)	20
US Pop Airplay (Billboard)	27
US Rolling Stone Top 100	28
Venezuela Anglo (Record Report)	16

=== Year-end charts ===
2020 year-end chart performance for "Daisies"
Chart (2020)	Position
US Adult Contemporary (Billboard)	35
US Adult Top 40 (Billboard)	31

2021 year-end chart performance for "Daisies"
Chart (2021)	Position
Hungary (Rádiós Top 40)	90

== Certifications ==
Certifications for "Daisies"
Region	Certification	Certified units/sales
Australia (ARIA)	Platinum	70,000^{‡}
Brazil (Pro-Música Brasil)	2× Platinum	80,000^{‡}
Canada (Music Canada)	Platinum	80,000^{‡}
New Zealand (RMNZ)	Gold	15,000^{‡}
United Kingdom (BPI)	Silver	200,000^{‡}
United States (RIAA)	Gold	500,000^{‡}
^{‡} Sales+streaming figures based on certification alone.

== Release history ==
Release dates and formats for "Daisies"
Region	Date	Format(s)	Version(s)	Label(s)	Ref.
Various	May 15, 2020	Digital download; streaming	Original	Capitol	
Canada	May 15, 2020	Adult contemporary radio; contemporary hit radio; hot adult contemporary radio	Original	Capitol	
Italy	May 15, 2020	Radio airplay	Original	Universal	
United States	May 18, 2020	Adult contemporary radio; hot adult contemporary radio; modern adult contemporary radio	Original	Capitol	
Various	May 29, 2020	Digital download; streaming	MK remix	Capitol	
United States	June 9, 2020	Contemporary hit radio	Original	Capitol	
Various	June 22, 2020	Digital download; streaming	Oliver Heldens remix	Capitol	
Various	July 1, 2020	Digital download; streaming	Acoustic	Capitol	
Various	September 18, 2020	7-inch vinyl	Original; instrumental	Capitol; Universal	
