= Harleys in Hawaii =

2019 single by Katy Perry

Single by Katy Perry
- Released: October 16, 2019
- Studio: Unsub Studios (Los Angeles, California); MXM Studios (Los Angeles, California) & (Stockholm, Sweden)
- Genre: Pop; trap; R&B; tropical; reggae
- Length: 3:06
- Label: Capitol
- Songwriters: Katy Perry; Charlie Puth; Johan Carlsson; Jacob Kasher Hindlin
- Producers: Carlsson; Puth

Katy Perry singles chronology
"Small Talk" (2019)	"Harleys in Hawaii" (2019)	"Never Worn White" (2020)

Music video
- "Harleys in Hawaii" on YouTube

"Harleys in Hawaii" is a song by the American singer-songwriter Katy Perry. It was released as a standalone single on October 16, 2019, by Capitol Records, along with its music video. It later became the tenth track of Perry's sixth studio album, Smile (2020). The song was written by Perry, Jacob Kasher Hindlin and its producers Charlie Puth and Johan Carlsson.

== Development and release ==
The song's cover art, revealed in October 2019, was called "retro" on Fox News. She said the inspiration for the song was a trip to Hawaii with fiancé Orlando Bloom.

Perry shot a music video for the song in Hawaii in July 2019. The video was produced by Catalan video producer Canada and directed by Pau Lopez, Gerardo del Hierro, and Tomas Pena under the name Manson and was released along with the song on October 16, 2019.

== Composition ==
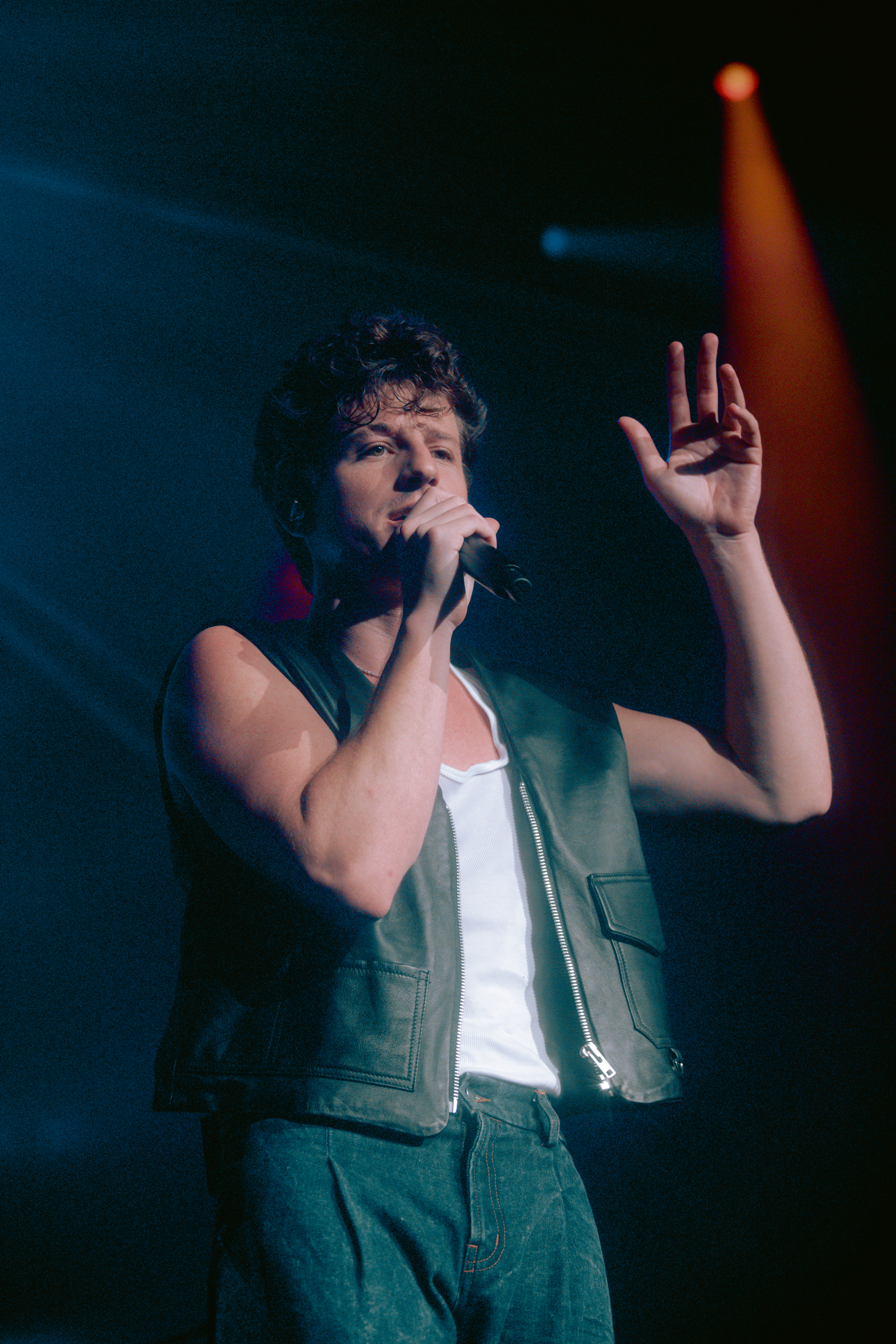
Charlie Puth (pictured) co-wrote and co-produced "Harleys In Hawaii" with Perry

"Harleys in Hawaii" is a tropical, pop, trap, reggae and R&B song, which describes Perry's emotions as she rides Harley-Davidson motorcycles in Hawaii with her lover. It has a moderately fast tempo of 140 beats per minute and follows a common time signature of 4/4. It is played in the key of B♭ minor and follows a chord progression of B♭m-E♭m-Fm. The song is three minutes and five seconds long.

== Critical reception ==
Dani Blum from Pitchfork believed that Perry remains a "master at executing proven chart-topping formulas". She praised Perry's vocals and deemed the track a "standard, breezy pop: a gently writhing beat". Louise Bruton from The Irish Times described the song as "hazy and oddly brilliant". "Harleys in Hawaii" was deemed as a highlight on Smile by Stephen Thomas Erlewine of AllMusic. John Dolan of Rolling Stone described "Harleys In Hawaii" as a "cute island R&B escapade".

== Chart performance ==
"Harleys in Hawaii" reached number one in the New Zealand Hot Singles chart, 67 in Scotland, and 71 in Canada. Within the United States, the song charted at number ten on the Bubbling Under Hot 100, and has been certified gold by the Recording Industry Association of America for equivalent sales of 500,000 units in the United States.

In the United Kingdom, the song debuted at number 45 on the Official Singles Chart in October 2019. It saw resurgence in sales and streams in September 2021, where its chart sales rose 426% month-on-month. A part of this can be attributed to the song going viral on TikTok. The track was streamed 215,000 times within the nation, a large increase from the 25,000 average weekly streams it was getting earlier in the year prior to going viral. In September 2023, two years after it initially went viral on TikTok, the song resurged in popularity once again with a viral powder-room performance of the song, as part of her series "Potty Jams", in which she belted out her songs in a bathroom. The song received a weekly streaming boost, nearly twice as much as before, at 1.14 million streams within the United States in the week ending September 28. The viral performance had also received millions of TikTok streams.

== Impact ==
Mark Gardiner from The New York Times noted the song's marketing value for the Harley-Davidson company. He said that "Harleys in Hawaii" has been viewed extensively by a demographic that "the motorcycle maker has had a hard time reaching." According to Business Insider, the publicity is estimated to be worth over $40 million for Harley-Davidson.

== Accolades ==
Year	Organization	Award	Result	Ref(s)
2020	MTV Video Music Awards	Best Cinematography	Nominated	
2021	Webby Awards	Best Music Video	Won	

== Track listing ==
- Digital download and streaming
1. "Harleys in Hawaii" – 3:06
- Digital download and streaming (Win and Woo Remix)
1. "Harleys in Hawaii" (Win and Woo Remix) – 3:26
- Digital download and streaming (Kandy Remix)
1. "Harleys in Hawaii" (Kandy Remix) – 2:45

== Credits and personnel ==
Credits adapted from Tidal.

- Katy Perry – vocals, songwriter
- Charlie Puth – producer, songwriter, backing vocals, drum programming, synthesizer
- Johan Carlsson – songwriter, producer, backing vocals, drum programming, synthesizer, guitar, rhodes
- Jacob Kasher Hindlin – songwriter
- Peter Karlsson – vocal editor, vocal producer
- Jeremy Lertola – engineer, assistant recording engineer
- Cory Bice – engineer
- Rachael Findlen – engineer
- Sam Holland – engineer
- Serban Ghenea – mixing
- John Hanes – mix engineer
- Dave Kutch – mastering engineer

== Charts ==
Weekly chart performance for "Harleys in Hawaii"
Chart (2019–2024)	Peak position
Australia (ARIA)	36
Belgium (Ultratip Bubbling Under Flanders)	37
Belgium (Ultratip Bubbling Under Wallonia)	33
Canada Hot 100 (Billboard)	71
Croatia (HRT)	45
Czech Republic Singles Digital (ČNS IFPI)	69
Estonia Airplay (TopHit)	81
France (SNEP Sales Chart)	85
Greece International (IFPI Greece)	26
Hungary (Single Top 40)	37
India (IMI)	11
Ireland (IRMA)	42
Italy Airplay (EarOne)	57
Lithuania (AGATA)	23
Netherlands (Dutch Tipparade 40)	20
Netherlands (Single Tip)	13
New Zealand Hot Singles (RMNZ)	1
Philippines (Philippine Hot 100)	67
Romania (Airplay 100)	61
Scottish Singles Sales (Official Charts)	67
Slovakia Singles Digital (ČNS IFPI)	43
Sweden Heatseeker (Sverigetopplistan)	7
Switzerland (Schweizer Hitparade)	72
UK Singles (Official Charts)	45
US Bubbling Under Hot 100 (Billboard)	10
Venezuela Anglo (Record Report)	45

== Certifications ==
Certifications and sales for "Harleys in Hawaii"
Region	Certification	Certified units/sales
Australia (ARIA)	Platinum	70,000^{‡}
Brazil (Pro-Música Brasil)	Diamond	160,000^{‡}
Canada (Music Canada)	Platinum	80,000^{‡}
Finland	Gold	2,000
France (SNEP)	Gold	100,000^{‡}
Mexico (AMPROFON)	Gold	30,000^{‡}
New Zealand (RMNZ)	Platinum	30,000^{‡}
Norway (IFPI Norway)	Gold	30,000^{‡}
Poland (ZPAV)	Platinum	50,000^{‡}
United Kingdom (BPI)	Silver	200,000^{‡}
United States (RIAA)	Gold	500,000^{‡}
Streaming
Greece (IFPI Greece)	Platinum	2,000,000^{†}
^{‡} Sales+streaming figures based on certification alone.^{†} Streaming-only figures based on certification alone.

== Release history ==
Release dates and formats for "Harleys in Hawaii"
Region	Date	Format(s)	Version	Label	Ref.
Various	October 16, 2019	Digital download; streaming	Original	Capitol	
Australia	October 18, 2019	Radio airplay	Original	Capitol	
Italy	October 31, 2019	Radio airplay	Original	Universal	
Various	November 13, 2019	Digital download; streaming	Kandy remix	Capitol	
Various	November 13, 2019	Digital download; streaming	Win and Woo remix	Capitol	
