= Play (residency) =

2021-2023 concert residency by Katy Perry

- Residency by Katy Perry
- Location: Winchester, Nevada, U.S.
- Venue: Resorts World Theatre
- Start date: December 29, 2021
- End date: November 4, 2023
- Legs: 10
- No. of shows: 80
- Box office: $46.4 million

Katy Perry concert chronology
- Witness: The Tour (2017–2018); Play (2021–2023); The Lifetimes Tour (2025)

Play was the first concert residency hosted by American singer Katy Perry. The first eight concerts were announced in May 2021, which ran at Resorts World Theatre from December 29, 2021, to January 15, 2022. Eight more shows were added later that month in response to popular demand, extending the residency to March 2022. Ticket sales became widely available to purchase on May 24 after a pre-sale for those with Citibank cards. Perry announced in January 2022 that she had added 16 more shows for May through August. On June 1, 2022, she announced that a further eight shows were added for October due to increasing demand.

Perry opened Play to a sold-out crowd at Resorts World Theatre, with the furthest seat being only 150 feet away from the stage. In February 2022, the first set of boxscores were reported by Billboard. She earned $6.98 million from the eight reported dates and drew a total of 32,000 attendees in the timeframe. From these earnings, she reached the top spot on the Artist Power Index (APX) chart by Pollstar. On April 10, 2023, Perry announced that the final show of the residency would take place on November 4, 2023. According to Billboard, the residency grossed $46.4 million, becoming the 8th highest grossing female residency in the history of Las Vegas and 18th overall.

== Background ==
The show draws influence from Honey, I Shrunk the Kids, Pee-wee's Playhouse, and Pee-wee's Big Adventure. Perry also stated, "It's just gonna be a feast for both the ears and the eyes and it is like the most laughter I've had in a rehearsal setting ever in my life. My co-creators and collaborators and the dancers and the band, everybody's just like, 'This is the kookiest idea.'"

== Production ==
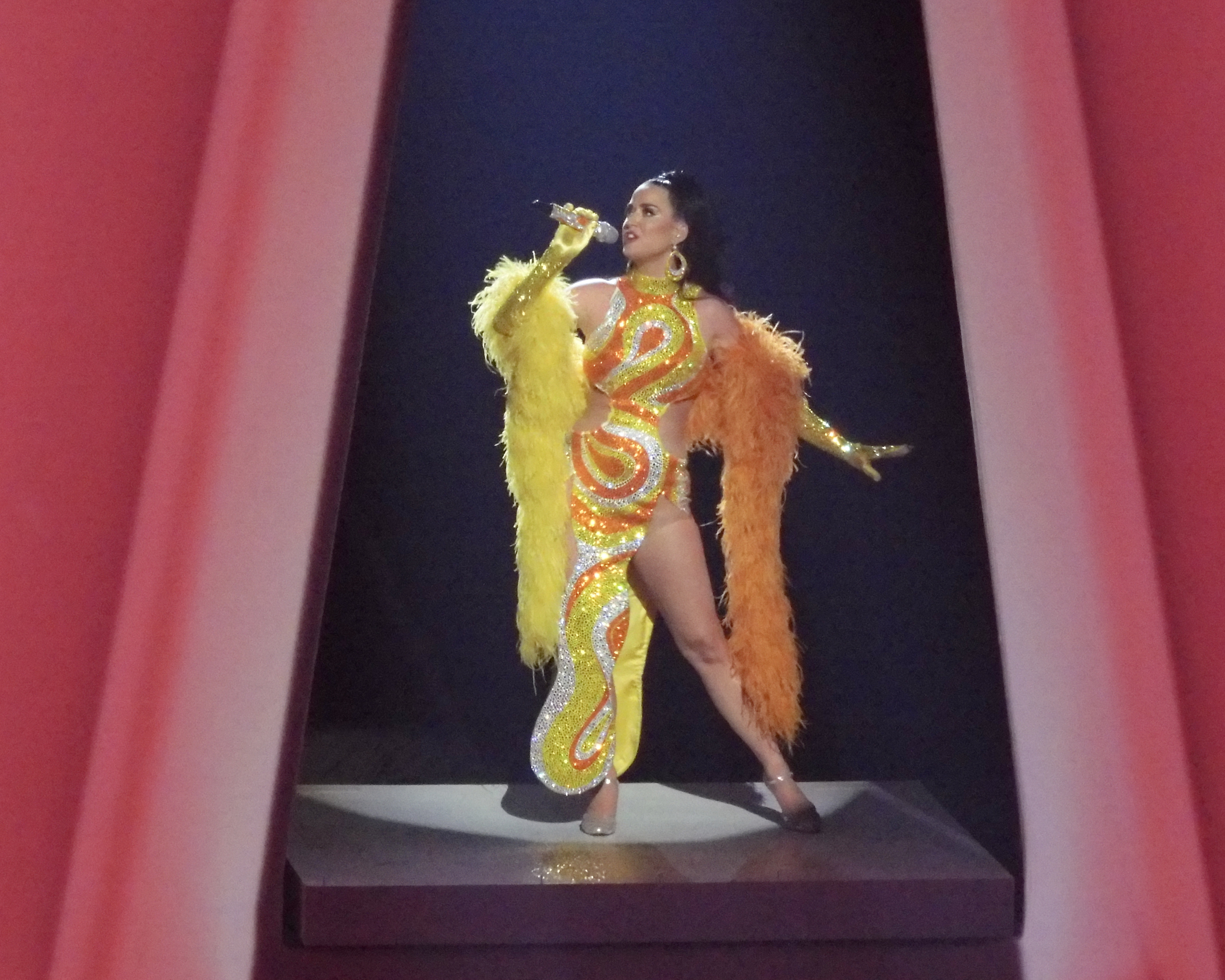
Perry performing "Teenage Dream"

Several parts of the show have been described by media outlets such as Vogue as "camp", such as Perry descending from the ceiling and being placed on a gigantic bed, interacting with a giant toilet and a giant face mask while performing, and a huge red rocking horse. Christian Allaire of Vogue called her the "Queen of Camp" for her approach to the show, saying: "Perry's playful, tongue-in-cheek approach to dressing really makes the show for us. More than a decade into her impressive career, she's clearly still a reigning queen of camp."

== Critical response ==
Play received universal critical acclaim. Mark Gray from Rolling Stone said that "the production was larger than life" for the residency's opening night, further adding: "the show is quintessential Perry, who indulged the emotional, the over-the-top, the whimsical, the psychedelic, and even the cheesy over the course of 95 minutes". Melinda Sheckells of Billboard also gave the first show a positive review, stating that Perry "left another unforgettable mark on the Strip in front of a sold-out, all-ages crowd of 5,000 loudly purring KatyCats", further adding: "'Perry Playland' transports the audience into another dimension of rainbow fluff, heart-shaped confetti and larger-than-life anthropomorphic household objects—it's part fantasy, part hallucination and thoroughly high-camp Perry." Yahoo! contributor Joyann Jeffrey felt Perry "perfectly wrapped up 2021 in a nutshell when she toasted a giant face mask onstage, and sang on top of some giant toilet paper rolls, which sat beside a huge bathtub and toilet" with Play and wrote the outfits used were "equally as amazing".

== Set list ==
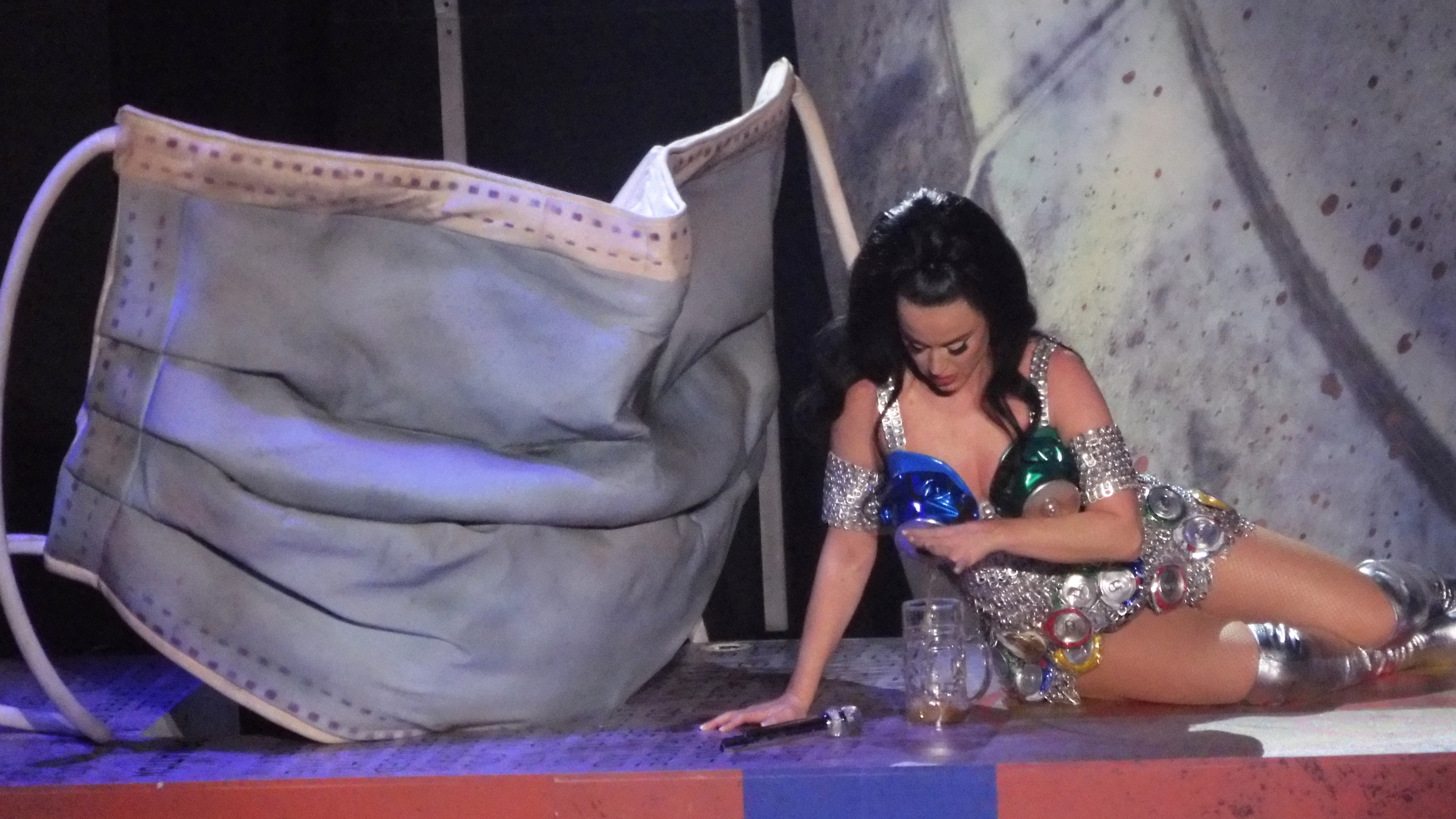
Perry during a show

Perry revealed the set list on December 28, 2021, a day before the first show was scheduled to start.

1. "E.T."
2. "Chained to the Rhythm"
3. "Dark Horse"
4. "Not the End of the World"
5. "California Gurls"
6. "Hot n Cold" / "Last Friday Night (T.G.I.F.)"
7. "Waking Up in Vegas"
8. "Bon Appétit"
9. "Daisies"
10. "I Kissed a Girl"
11. "Lost" / "Part of Me" / "Wide Awake"
12. "Never Really Over"
13. "Swish Swish"
14. "When I'm Gone" / "Walking on Air"
15. "Teenage Dream"
16. "Smile"
17. "Roar"
18. "The Greatest Love of All" / "Firework"

== Shows ==
List of dates, city, country, venue, attendance and revenue earned
Date	City	Country	Venue	Attendance	Revenue
December 29, 2021	Winchester	United States	Resorts World Theatre	309,016	$46,470,396
December 31, 2021	Winchester	United States	Resorts World Theatre	309,016	$46,470,396
January 1, 2022	Winchester	United States	Resorts World Theatre	309,016	$46,470,396
January 7, 2022	Winchester	United States	Resorts World Theatre	309,016	$46,470,396
January 8, 2022	Winchester	United States	Resorts World Theatre	309,016	$46,470,396
January 12, 2022	Winchester	United States	Resorts World Theatre	309,016	$46,470,396
January 14, 2022	Winchester	United States	Resorts World Theatre	309,016	$46,470,396
January 15, 2022	Winchester	United States	Resorts World Theatre	309,016	$46,470,396
March 2, 2022	Winchester	United States	Resorts World Theatre	309,016	$46,470,396
March 4, 2022	Winchester	United States	Resorts World Theatre	309,016	$46,470,396
March 5, 2022	Winchester	United States	Resorts World Theatre	309,016	$46,470,396
March 11, 2022	Winchester	United States	Resorts World Theatre	309,016	$46,470,396
March 12, 2022	Winchester	United States	Resorts World Theatre	309,016	$46,470,396
March 16, 2022	Winchester	United States	Resorts World Theatre	309,016	$46,470,396
March 18, 2022	Winchester	United States	Resorts World Theatre	309,016	$46,470,396
March 19, 2022	Winchester	United States	Resorts World Theatre	309,016	$46,470,396
May 27, 2022	Winchester	United States	Resorts World Theatre	309,016	$46,470,396
May 28, 2022	Winchester	United States	Resorts World Theatre	309,016	$46,470,396
May 29, 2022	Winchester	United States	Resorts World Theatre	309,016	$46,470,396
June 3, 2022	Winchester	United States	Resorts World Theatre	309,016	$46,470,396
June 4, 2022	Winchester	United States	Resorts World Theatre	309,016	$46,470,396
June 8, 2022	Winchester	United States	Resorts World Theatre	309,016	$46,470,396
June 10, 2022	Winchester	United States	Resorts World Theatre	309,016	$46,470,396
June 11, 2022	Winchester	United States	Resorts World Theatre	309,016	$46,470,396
July 29, 2022	Winchester	United States	Resorts World Theatre	309,016	$46,470,396
July 30, 2022	Winchester	United States	Resorts World Theatre	309,016	$46,470,396
August 3, 2022	Winchester	United States	Resorts World Theatre	309,016	$46,470,396
August 5, 2022	Winchester	United States	Resorts World Theatre	309,016	$46,470,396
August 6, 2022	Winchester	United States	Resorts World Theatre	309,016	$46,470,396
August 10, 2022	Winchester	United States	Resorts World Theatre	309,016	$46,470,396
August 12, 2022	Winchester	United States	Resorts World Theatre	309,016	$46,470,396
August 13, 2022	Winchester	United States	Resorts World Theatre	309,016	$46,470,396
October 5, 2022	Winchester	United States	Resorts World Theatre	309,016	$46,470,396
October 7, 2022	Winchester	United States	Resorts World Theatre	309,016	$46,470,396
October 8, 2022	Winchester	United States	Resorts World Theatre	309,016	$46,470,396
October 14, 2022	Winchester	United States	Resorts World Theatre	309,016	$46,470,396
October 15, 2022	Winchester	United States	Resorts World Theatre	309,016	$46,470,396
October 19, 2022	Winchester	United States	Resorts World Theatre	309,016	$46,470,396
October 21, 2022	Winchester	United States	Resorts World Theatre	309,016	$46,470,396
October 22, 2022	Winchester	United States	Resorts World Theatre	309,016	$46,470,396
February 15, 2023	Winchester	United States	Resorts World Theatre	309,016	$46,470,396
February 17, 2023	Winchester	United States	Resorts World Theatre	309,016	$46,470,396
February 18, 2023	Winchester	United States	Resorts World Theatre	309,016	$46,470,396
February 22, 2023	Winchester	United States	Resorts World Theatre	309,016	$46,470,396
February 24, 2023	Winchester	United States	Resorts World Theatre	309,016	$46,470,396
February 25, 2023	Winchester	United States	Resorts World Theatre	309,016	$46,470,396
March 3, 2023	Winchester	United States	Resorts World Theatre	309,016	$46,470,396
March 4, 2023	Winchester	United States	Resorts World Theatre	309,016	$46,470,396
April 5, 2023	Winchester	United States	Resorts World Theatre	309,016	$46,470,396
April 7, 2023	Winchester	United States	Resorts World Theatre	309,016	$46,470,396
April 8, 2023	Winchester	United States	Resorts World Theatre	309,016	$46,470,396
April 12, 2023	Winchester	United States	Resorts World Theatre	309,016	$46,470,396
April 14, 2023	Winchester	United States	Resorts World Theatre	309,016	$46,470,396
April 15, 2023	Winchester	United States	Resorts World Theatre	309,016	$46,470,396
May 12, 2023	Winchester	United States	Resorts World Theatre	309,016	$46,470,396
May 13, 2023	Winchester	United States	Resorts World Theatre	309,016	$46,470,396
May 17, 2023	Winchester	United States	Resorts World Theatre	309,016	$46,470,396
May 19, 2023	Winchester	United States	Resorts World Theatre	309,016	$46,470,396
May 20, 2023	Winchester	United States	Resorts World Theatre	309,016	$46,470,396
May 24, 2023	Winchester	United States	Resorts World Theatre	309,016	$46,470,396
May 27, 2023	Winchester	United States	Resorts World Theatre	309,016	$46,470,396
May 28, 2023	Winchester	United States	Resorts World Theatre	309,016	$46,470,396
July 28, 2023	Winchester	United States	Resorts World Theatre	309,016	$46,470,396
July 29, 2023	Winchester	United States	Resorts World Theatre	309,016	$46,470,396
August 2, 2023	Winchester	United States	Resorts World Theatre	309,016	$46,470,396
August 4, 2023	Winchester	United States	Resorts World Theatre	309,016	$46,470,396
August 5, 2023	Winchester	United States	Resorts World Theatre	309,016	$46,470,396
August 9, 2023	Winchester	United States	Resorts World Theatre	309,016	$46,470,396
August 11, 2023	Winchester	United States	Resorts World Theatre	309,016	$46,470,396
August 12, 2023	Winchester	United States	Resorts World Theatre	309,016	$46,470,396
October 4, 2023	Winchester	United States	Resorts World Theatre	309,016	$46,470,396
October 6, 2023	Winchester	United States	Resorts World Theatre	309,016	$46,470,396
October 7, 2023	Winchester	United States	Resorts World Theatre	309,016	$46,470,396
October 11, 2023	Winchester	United States	Resorts World Theatre	309,016	$46,470,396
October 13, 2023	Winchester	United States	Resorts World Theatre	309,016	$46,470,396
October 14, 2023	Winchester	United States	Resorts World Theatre	309,016	$46,470,396
October 31, 2023	Winchester	United States	Resorts World Theatre	309,016	$46,470,396
November 1, 2023	Winchester	United States	Resorts World Theatre	309,016	$46,470,396
November 3, 2023	Winchester	United States	Resorts World Theatre	309,016	$46,470,396
November 4, 2023	Winchester	United States	Resorts World Theatre	309,016	$46,470,396
