= Smile (Katy Perry song) =

2020 single by Katy Perry

- Cover for the Giorgio Moroder remix. A similar cover was released for the Joel Corry remix.

Single by Katy Perry

from the album Smile
- Released: July 10, 2020
- Studio: Pulse and Windmark (Los Angeles, California)
- Genre: Nu-disco
- Length: 2:47
- Label: Capitol
- Songwriters: Katy Perry; Josh Abraham; Oliver Goldstein; Brittany "Starrah" Hazzard; Ferras Alqaisi; Benny Golson; Kier Gist; Anthony Criss; Vincent Brown
- Producers: Abraham; Oligee

Katy Perry singles chronology
"Daisies" (2020)	"Smile" (2020)	"Electric" (2021)

Music video
- "Smile" on YouTube

"Smile" is a song by the American singer-songwriter Katy Perry for her sixth studio album of the same name (2020). It was released on July 10, 2020, by Capitol Records as the second single from the album, along with the album's pre-order. Musically, it is a nu-disco song which samples Naughty by Nature's 1999 song "Jamboree". On the song, Perry talks about expressing her gratitude for changes in her life. Music critics complimented the song's message and upbeat production, but deemed it lyrically simplistic and critiqued its redundant sound. A version featuring American rapper Diddy is featured on some vinyl versions of the album, while remixes of the song by Giorgio Moroder and Joel Corry have also been released to promote the song. "Smile" was performed during the SiriusXM Hits 1 and the concert residency Play (2021–2023).

== Background and composition ==
The song was officially released on July 10, 2020, along with the album's pre-order, with Perry saying she hoped "it can be a few minutes of energizing hopefulness for you as it is for meee". "Smile" is a nu-disco song which runs for 2 minutes and 47 seconds. It samples Naughty by Nature's 1999 song "Jamboree". The song starts off with an "upbeat hook" and a "dance-driven groove" that leads to the chorus containing lyrics expressing her gratitude for changes in her life: "Yeah, I'm thankful / Scratch that, baby, I'm grateful / Gotta say it's really been a while / But now I got back that smile". On the lyrics, Perry also "extols the virtue of perseverance" after suffering setbacks where every day feels like Groundhog Day as well as "going through motions felt so fake".

The song was inspired by Perry's own experiences and was described by Uproxx as an "ode to remembering life's joys". Speaking about the release of the song, she said "I wrote this song when I was coming through one of the darkest periods of my life. When I listen to it now, it's a great reminder that I made it through. It's three minutes of energizing hopefulness". On some vinyl versions of the album, American rapper Diddy is featured on "Smile". "Smile" was also promoted with remixes by Italian DJ Giorgio Moroder and British DJ Joel Corry.

== Critical reception ==
The song received mixed reviews. Vulture's Zoe Haylock called the song "empowering", comparing it to Perry's 2013 single "Roar". Jason Lipshutz from Billboard, also compared "Smile" to Perry's previous songs "Walking on Air" and "Birthday", both taken from Perry's fourth album, Prism (2013), calling "Smile" the "same sort of dizzy glitter-pop" Perry embraced on Prism. In writing for Consequence of Sound, Wren Graves noted the song's positive message, stating that "lyrics [are] overbrimming with warmth and gratitude. The song evokes the light at the end of the tunnel". Insider's Callie Ahlgrim labelled the song one of the worst of 2020, calling it "unbearably corny" and comparing it to the children's song "Baby Shark".

== Chart performance ==
"Smile" debuted at number ten on the New Zealand Hot Singles Chart, 22 in Scotland and 73 in the United Kingdom. It also debuted at number twenty-one on the US Bubbling Under Hot 100 and has been certified gold by the Recording Industry Association of America for equivalent sales of 500,000 units in the United States.

== Music videos ==
=== Performance video ===
Perry released a performance video for "Smile" on July 14, 2020. In the video, she is dressed as a clown, in her "most fashionable clown attire, wearing an orange, polka-dotted blazer and matching blue jumper with whimsical tuxedo detailing across the front" and performs against a backdrop with a "number of giant clown hands, seated atop a comically oversized clown shoe and more".

=== Music video ===
The official "Smile" music video was released on August 13, 2020, in an exclusive window on Facebook Watch, before premiering on other platforms the next day. It features a video game theme, with Perry switching between real-life cosplay and animated video game characters. It was directed by Mathew Miguel Cullen, with storyboarding by Cullen and Josh Chesler.

== Track listing and formats ==
Digital download and streaming

1. "Smile" – 2:47

Digital download and streaming – Giorgio Moroder remix

1. "Smile" (Giorgio Moroder remix) – 3:07

Digital download and streaming – Joel Corry remix

1. "Smile" (Joel Corry remix) – 3:02

Digital download and streaming – Joel Corry extended remix

1. "Smile" (Joel Corry extended remix) – 4:17

Digital download and streaming – M-22 remix

1. "Smile" (M-22 remix) – 3:00

Digital download and streaming – Marshall Jefferson remix

1. "Smile" (Marshall Jefferson remix) – 2:38

Digital download and streaming – Tough Love remix

1. "Smile" (Tough Love remix) – 2:47

== Credits and personnel ==
=== Song credits ===
Credits adapted from Tidal.

- Katy Perry – lead vocals, songwriter
- Josh Abraham – producer, songwriter
- Oligee – producer, songwriter
- G Koop – producer, additional producer
- Anthony Criss – songwriter, credit song "Jamboree"
- Kier Gist – songwriter, credit song "Jamboree"
- Vincent Brown – songwriter, credit song "Jamboree"
- Benny Golson – songwriter, credit song "Jamboree" and "I'm Always Dancin' to the Music"
- Brittany "Starrah" Hazzard – songwriter
- Ferras Alqaisi – songwriter
- Blake Harden – engineer
- Clint "CJMIXEDIT" Badal – engineer
- Darth "Denver" Moon – engineer
- Louie Gomez – engineer
- Manny Marroquin – mixer
- Chris Galland – mixing engineer
- Dave Kutch – mastering engineer
- Dave Richards – associated performer, trumpet
- Kamaria Anita Ousley – associated performer, background vocalist
- Lincoln Adler – associated performer, saxophone

=== Music video credits ===
Adapted from YouTube.

- Brandon Bonfiglio - executive producer
- Josh Chesler - story
- Jeff Cronenweth - director of photography
- Mathew Miguel Cullen - director, story
- David Goldstein - 1st associate director
- Andrew Lerios - producer
- Ivan Ovalle - post production supervisor
- Luga Podesta - executive producer
- Alex Randall - production supervisor
- John Richoux - production designer

== Charts ==
=== Weekly charts ===
Weekly chart performance
Chart (2020–2024)	Peak position
Argentina Hot 100 (Billboard)	77
Australia (ARIA)	117
Belgium (Ultratip Bubbling Under Flanders)	12
Belgium (Ultratip Bubbling Under Wallonia)	29
Canada CHR/Top 40 (Billboard)	47
Canada Digital Song Sales (Billboard)	23
CIS Airplay (TopHit)	30
Croatia International Airplay (Top lista)	15
Czech Republic Airplay (ČNS IFPI)	10
El Salvador (Monitor Latino)	17
Finland Airplay (Radiosoittolista)	49
France (SNEP Sales Chart)	69
Iceland (Tónlistinn)	39
Ireland (IRMA)	99
Italy Airplay (EarOne)	36
Japan Hot 100 (Billboard)	77
Moldova Airplay (TopHit)	99
Netherlands (Dutch Tipparade 40)	23
New Zealand Hot Singles (RMNZ)	10
Poland Airplay (ZPAV)	57
Russia Airplay (TopHit)	26
Scottish Singles Sales (Official Charts)	22
Slovakia Airplay (ČNS IFPI)	32
UK Singles (Official Charts)	73
US Bubbling Under Hot 100 (Billboard)	21
US Adult Contemporary (Billboard)	25
US Digital Song Sales (Billboard)	28
Venezuela (Record Report)	56

=== Monthly charts ===
Monthly chart performance
Chart (2020)	Peak position
Paraguay (SGP)	53
Russia Airplay (TopHit)	39

== Certifications ==
Certifications and sales
Region	Certification	Certified units/sales
Australia (ARIA)	Platinum	70,000^{‡}
Brazil (Pro-Música Brasil)	Platinum	60,000^{‡}
Canada (Music Canada)	Gold	40,000^{‡}
Norway (IFPI Norway)	Gold	30,000^{‡}
United States (RIAA)	Gold	500,000^{‡}
^{‡} Sales+streaming figures based on certification alone.

== Release history ==
Release dates and formats
Region	Date	Format(s)	Version	Label	Ref.
Various	July 10, 2020	Digital download; streaming	Original	Capitol	
Italy	July 24, 2020	Radio airplay	Original	Universal	
Various	August 25, 2020	Digital download; streaming	Giorgio Moroder remix	Capitol	
Various	September 2, 2020	Digital download; streaming	Joel Corry remix	Capitol	
Various	September 2, 2020	Digital download; streaming	Joel Corry extended remix	Capitol	
Various	September 18, 2020	Digital download; streaming	M-22 remix	Capitol	
Various	September 18, 2020	Digital download; streaming	Marshall Jefferson remix	Capitol	
Various	September 18, 2020	Digital download; streaming	Tough Love remix	Capitol	
