= The Daylights =

Former American alternative rock band (formed 2004)

- Origin: Los Angeles, California
- Genres: Alternative rock
- Years active: 2004–2013
- Labels: 87th Floor Records
- Members: Ran Jackson; Ricky Jackson; Svend Lerche
- Past members: Adam Farley
- Website: thedaylights.com

The Daylights were an alternative rock band from Los Angeles, California that formed in 2004. The trio was fronted by brothers Ran Jackson and Ricky Jackson, with Svend Lerche on Drums. Best known for their song, "I Hope This Gets To You" that was released in December 2010 as a virtual "love letter" on YouTube, it was based on a concept they conceived with their roommate for his long distance girlfriend. Within the first 72 hours, the video was viewed over 1.5 million times.

Their self titled album, The Daylights, was released in 2010, on the band's own label, 87th Floor Records. The album spent 5 weeks on the Billboard Heatseekers Chart. "Rogue Machine" and "I Hope This Gets To You" both reached Top 50 at Hot AC radio, and The Daylights were the only unsigned band in the Top 100. "I Hope This Gets To You" went to No. 4 on Sirius XM.

The Daylights had three headlining tours in support of their self-titled album, including the "No Reverse Tour" fall 2011. Other tours include long runs with Katy Perry, OneRepublic, NeedtoBreathe, Civil Twilight and The Parlotones.

Their song "Outsider" was featured in The Sims 2 as a Simlish cover.

== Band members ==
- Ran Jackson – Lead guitar, Vocals
- Ricky Jackson – Bass guitar, Vocals
- Svend Lerche – Drums

The band has made musical appearances in TV shows like Castle, Drop Dead Diva, One Tree Hill, Vampire Diaries, Pretty Little Liars, Teen Wolf, Rookie Blue, MTV shows, Laguna Beach, Smallville, and the theme song for the Major League Baseball Network. They've also had music in the Oscar Nominated movie, Rabbit Hole, I love you, Phillip Morris, Sorority Row, and Grandma's Boy.

== Former members ==
- Adam Farley – Drums

== Discography ==
- Shift and Blur (2004)
- Sans Radio EP (2008)
- The Daylights (2010)
- Modern Fossils EP (2012)
