= Hear Me Now (Alok and Bruno Martini song) =

Single by Alok and Bruno Martini featuring Zeeba
- Released: 21 October 2016
- Recorded: 2016
- Genre: Brazilian bass; indie pop; house
- Length: 3:12
- Label: Spinnin'
- Songwriters: Alok; Bruno Martini; Zeeba
- Producers: Alok; Bruno Martini

Alok singles chronology
"All I Want" (2016)	"Hear Me Now" (2016)	"Sirene" (2016)

Music video
- "Hear Me Now" on YouTube

"Hear Me Now" is a song recorded by Brazilian DJs Alok and Bruno Martini featuring the Brazilian-American recording artist Zeeba. The song was released on 21 October 2016 via Spinnin' Records.

== Composition ==
Noiseprn described the genre of the song as 'Brazilian bass'.

== Music video ==
An official music video for the song was released on YouTube by Alok and Spinnin' Records directed and written by Caio Amantini and Rapha Pampiona depict a grown man visiting his parents home where he and his father reliving their memories together but this turned out to be a dream that he slept during the Taxi drive on the way to his parents home. He rushed to his father to give him a hug. The latter having over 673 million views as of January 2026.

== Track listing ==
Digital download

1. "Hear Me Now" – 3:12
2. "Hear Me Now" (Club Edit) – 5:34

== Charts ==
=== Weekly charts ===
Chart (2016–18)	Peak position
Austria (Ö3 Austria Top 40)	40
Belgium (Ultratip Bubbling Under Flanders)	20
Belgium (Ultratip Bubbling Under Wallonia)	27
Brazil Hot 100 (Billboard)	54
Brazil Pop Airplay (Billboard Brasil)	6
Czech Republic Airplay (ČNS IFPI)	7
Czech Republic Singles Digital (ČNS IFPI)	28
Denmark (Tracklisten)	40
Finland (Suomen virallinen lista)	14
France (SNEP)	50
Germany (GfK)	50
Hungary (Rádiós Top 40)	26
Italy (FIMI)	14
Mexico Airplay (Billboard)	1
Netherlands (Dutch Top 40)	34
Netherlands (Single Top 100)	57
Norway (VG-lista)	8
Portugal (AFP)	19
Russia Airplay (TopHit)	2
Slovakia Airplay (ČNS IFPI)	10
Slovakia Singles Digital (ČNS IFPI)	41
Sweden (Sverigetopplistan)	11
Switzerland (Schweizer Hitparade)	41
Ukraine Airplay (Tophit)	1
US Hot Dance/Electronic Songs (Billboard)	20

=== Year-end charts ===
Chart (2017)	Position
Brazil (Pro-Música Brasil)	2
France (SNEP)	139
Hungary (Rádiós Top 40)	84
Italy (FIMI)	37
Latvia Airplay (LaIPA)	16
Netherlands Dance (MegaCharts)	32
Sweden (Sverigetopplistan)	94
Switzerland (Schweizer Hitparade)	78
US Hot Dance/Electronic Songs (Billboard)	69

== Certifications ==
Region	Certification	Certified units/sales
Brazil (Pro-Música Brasil)	3× Platinum	300,000^{‡}
Denmark (IFPI Danmark)	Gold	45,000^{‡}
France (SNEP)	Platinum	133,333^{‡}
Germany (BVMI)	Gold	200,000^{‡}
Italy (FIMI)	3× Platinum	150,000^{‡}
New Zealand (RMNZ)	Gold	15,000^{‡}
Poland (ZPAV)	Gold	25,000^{‡}
Portugal (AFP)	Gold	5,000^{‡}
Spain (Promusicae)	Gold	30,000^{‡}
^{‡} Sales+streaming figures based on certification alone.
