= List of songs recorded by Katy Perry =

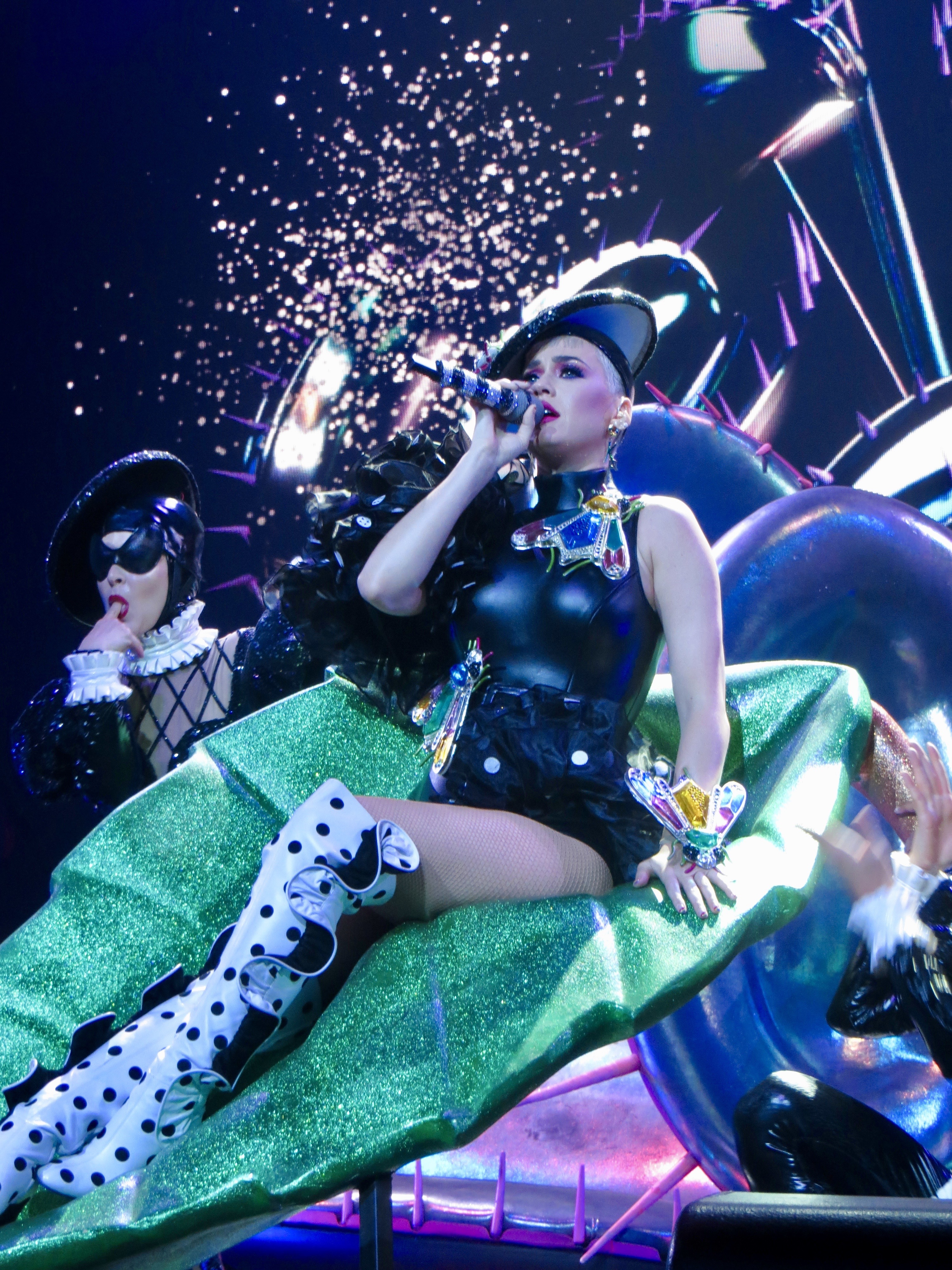
Katy Perry performing in 2017

The American singer Katy Perry has recorded songs for seven studio albums. After singing at church during her childhood, she decided to pursue a career in music in her teenage years. She signed a record deal with Red Hill Records, and released a gospel album called Katy Hudson in 2001. She wrote its songs "Last Call", "My Own Monster", "Spit", and "When There's Nothing Left" by herself while co-writing the remaining six with Mark Dickson, Scott Faircloff, Tommy Collier, and Brian White. The album was unsuccessful and it failed to garner any attention. Red Hill Records shut down later that year. Following two unsuccessful contracts with Island Def Jam Records and Columbia Records, whereby Perry was dropped by both them before she could finish an album, she ultimately secured a deal with Capitol Records in 2007, a division of record label Virgin.

Her second studio album, One of the Boys, was released in June 2008. The pop-rock album was composed over a period of five years. The lead single, "I Kissed a Girl", was co-written by Perry with Dr. Luke, Max Martin and Cathy Dennis, and alludes to bisexuality. Perry was the sole writer of "Thinking of You", "Mannequin", and the album's title track. The songs "Mannequin" and "Lost" have themes of determination and self-belief. The track "Ur So Gay" opens with the lyrics "I hope you hang yourself with your H&M scarf," which BBC critic Lizzie Ennever believed was Perry's response to people who may have "wronged her in the past". During the recording process of the album, Perry had written the songs "I Do Not Hook Up" and "Long Shot" with Kara DioGuardi and Greg Wells, but decided not to include them on the final track list. They were later recorded by American singer Kelly Clarkson for her album All I Ever Wanted (2009). In 2009, she released a live album titled MTV Unplugged, which featured acoustic performances of five tracks from One of the Boys along with two new recordings, "Brick by Brick" and "Hackensack".

Perry released her third studio album, Teenage Dream, in August 2010. She reunited with Dr. Luke, Max Martin and Greg Wells for most of the songs, but also worked with some new writers and producers for the project. For the track "Firework", Perry collaborated with Sandy Vee, Ester Dean and the Norwegian production duo Stargate, and with Tricky Stewart on the songs "Who Am I Living For?" and "Circle the Drain". Lyrically, "Who Am I Living For?" recalls Perry's Christian roots and retells the biblical story of Esther, the Jewish Queen of Persia who discovered and foiled Haman's plan to massacre the Jewish community. "Circle the Drain" alludes to a previous boyfriend's drug addiction, speculated to be about Travie McCoy, and the effects it had on them as a couple, with lyrics which include "You fall asleep during foreplay/ 'Cause the pills you take are more your forte." Another Stargate produced track called "Peacock" makes use of double entendres whereby Perry propositions her lover with showing her his penis, singing "I wanna see your peacock, cock, cock."

The singer re-released the album in March 2012 with the title Teenage Dream: The Complete Confection. New material included alternate versions of some of the standard songs, including an acoustic version of "The One That Got Away". Perry recorded three new songs for the re-issue, including "Dressin' Up", which lyrically documents dressing up for one's lover, and features a request by Perry for a "dirty doggie" to "pet her kitty". Her fourth studio album, Prism, was released in October 2013. It was noted for having a noticeably darker and moodier tone than her previous releases. "Dark Horse" is a trap and hip hop song about witchcraft and black magic. The song "Birthday" was Perry's attempt at writing a song which Mariah Carey would have included in her eponymous debut album. Aside from her regular collaborators, Perry co-wrote the track "Double Rainbow" with Sia and Greg Kurstin, while Emeli Sandé contributed lyrics to "It Takes Two". Her fifth album, Witness, was released in June 2017. Its tracks include "Bigger than Me", "Bon Appétit", "Chained to the Rhythm", and "Swish Swish".

In August 2020, Perry released her sixth studio album Smile with earlier released songs "Never Really Over" and "Harleys in Hawaii". It spawned the singles "Daisies" and "Smile" and a promotional single titled "What Makes a Woman". Her seventh album 143 followed in September 2024. Its lead single, titled "Woman's World", was released on July 11, 2024.

== Songs ==
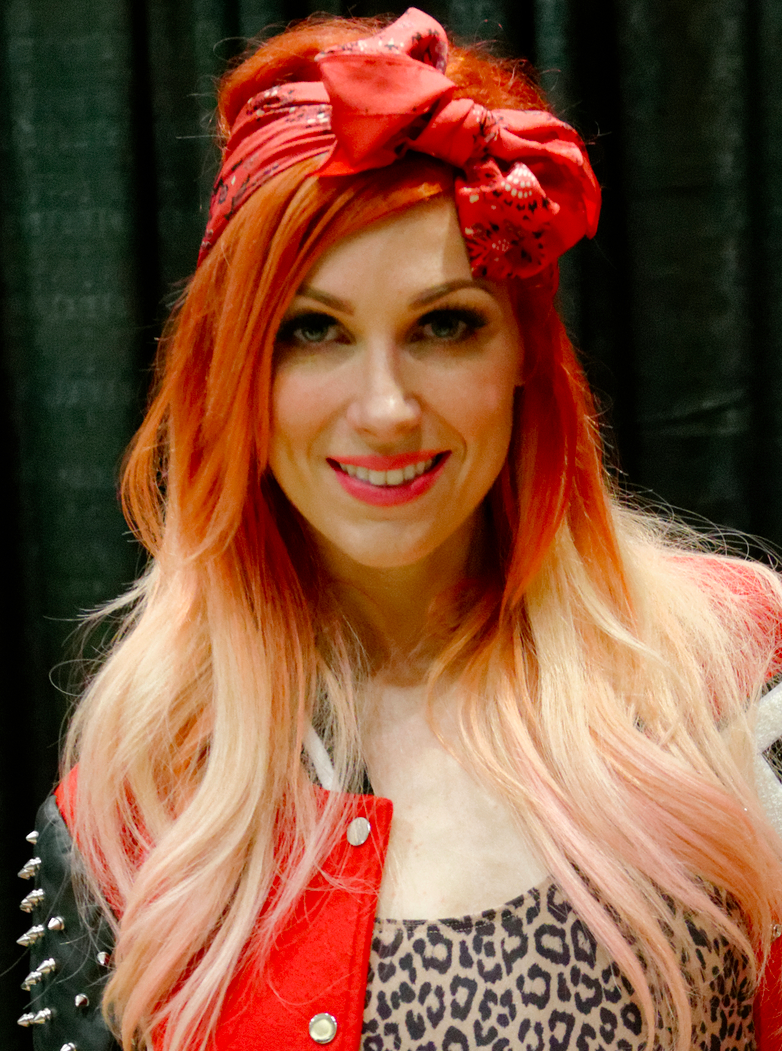
Bonnie McKee has co-written five songs with Perry which have peaked at number one on the US Billboard Hot 100.

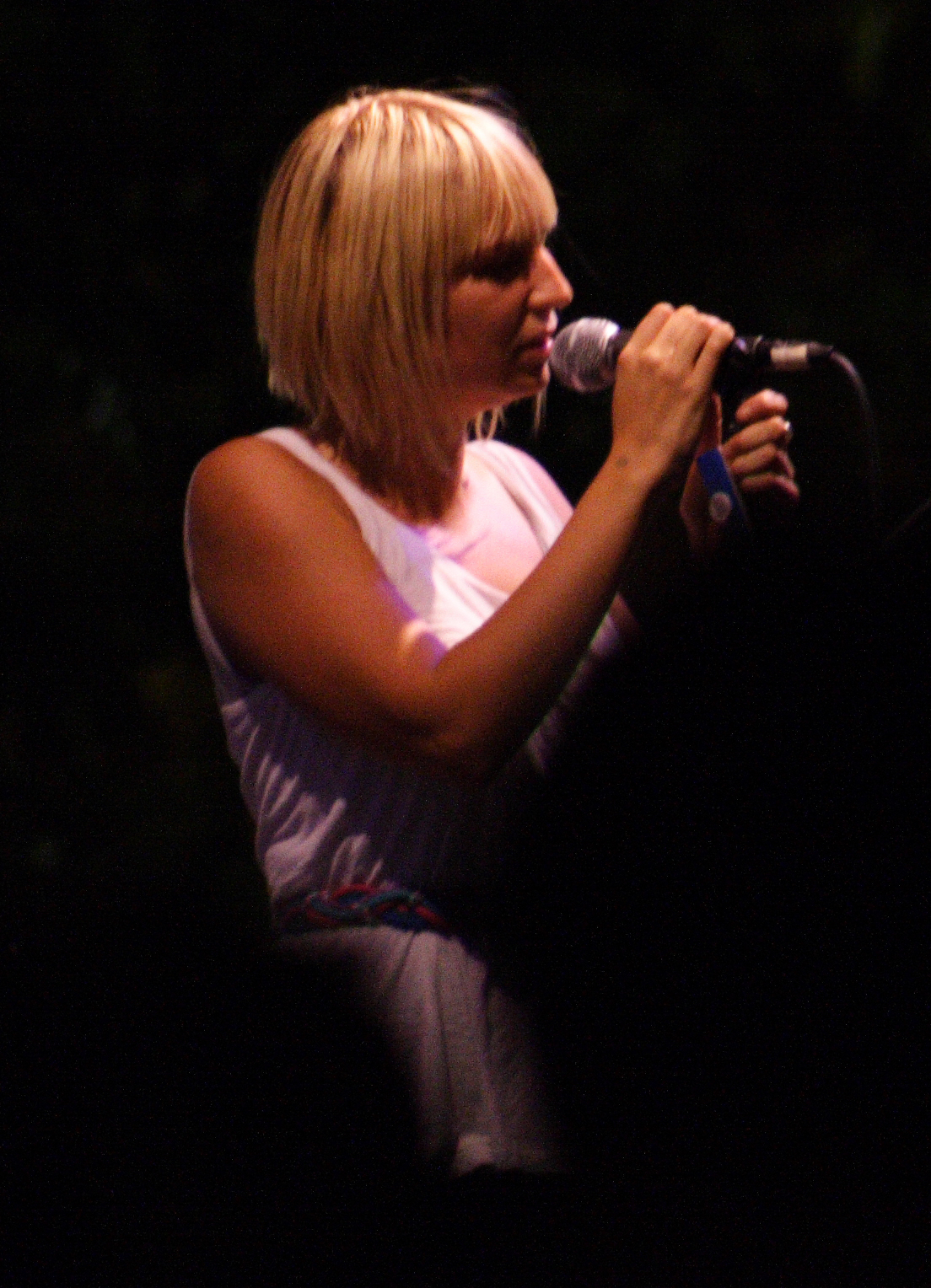
Sia co-wrote the songs "Chained to the Rhythm", "Double Rainbow" and "Hey Hey Hey".

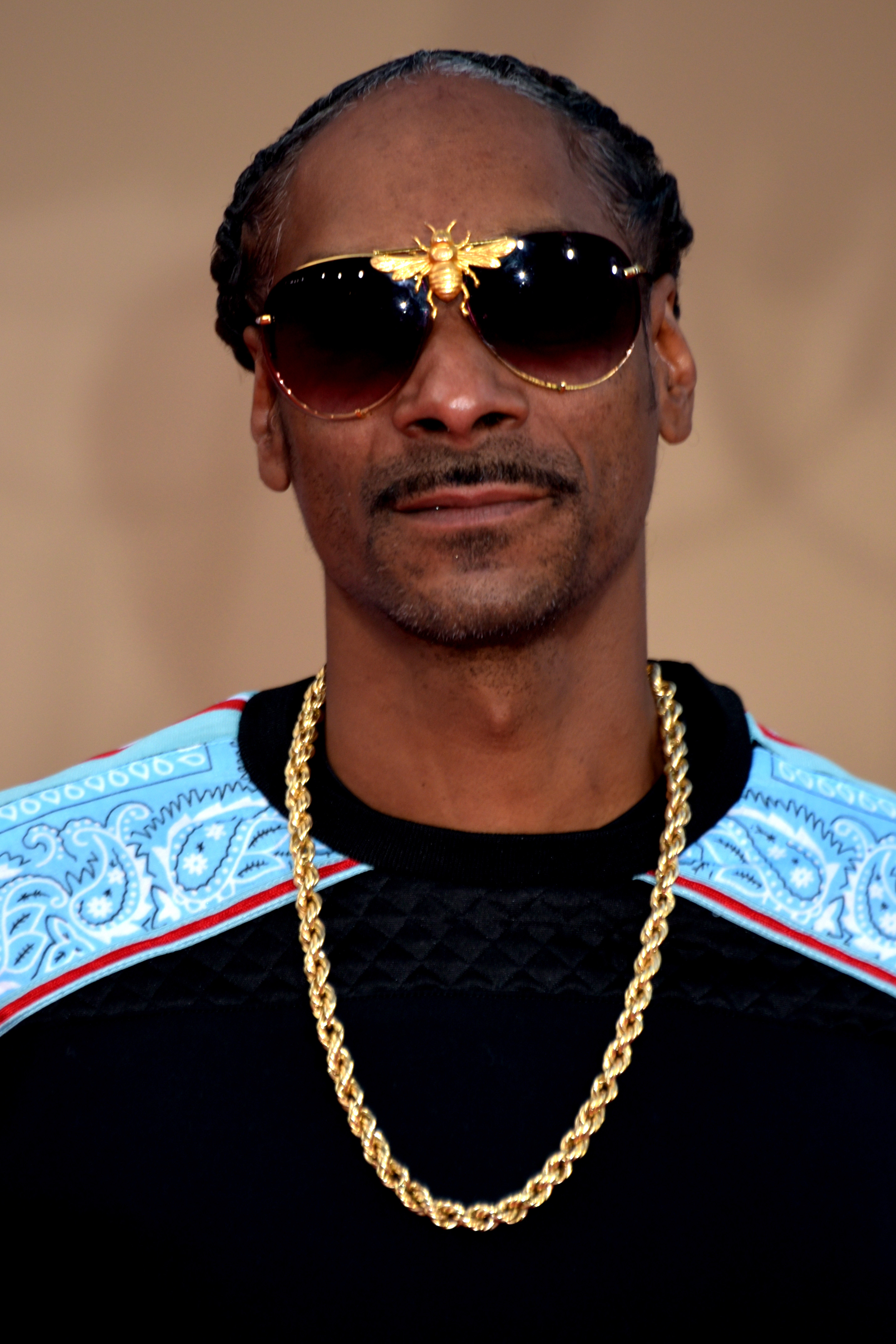
Snoop Dogg co-wrote "California Gurls" and appears as a featured artist.

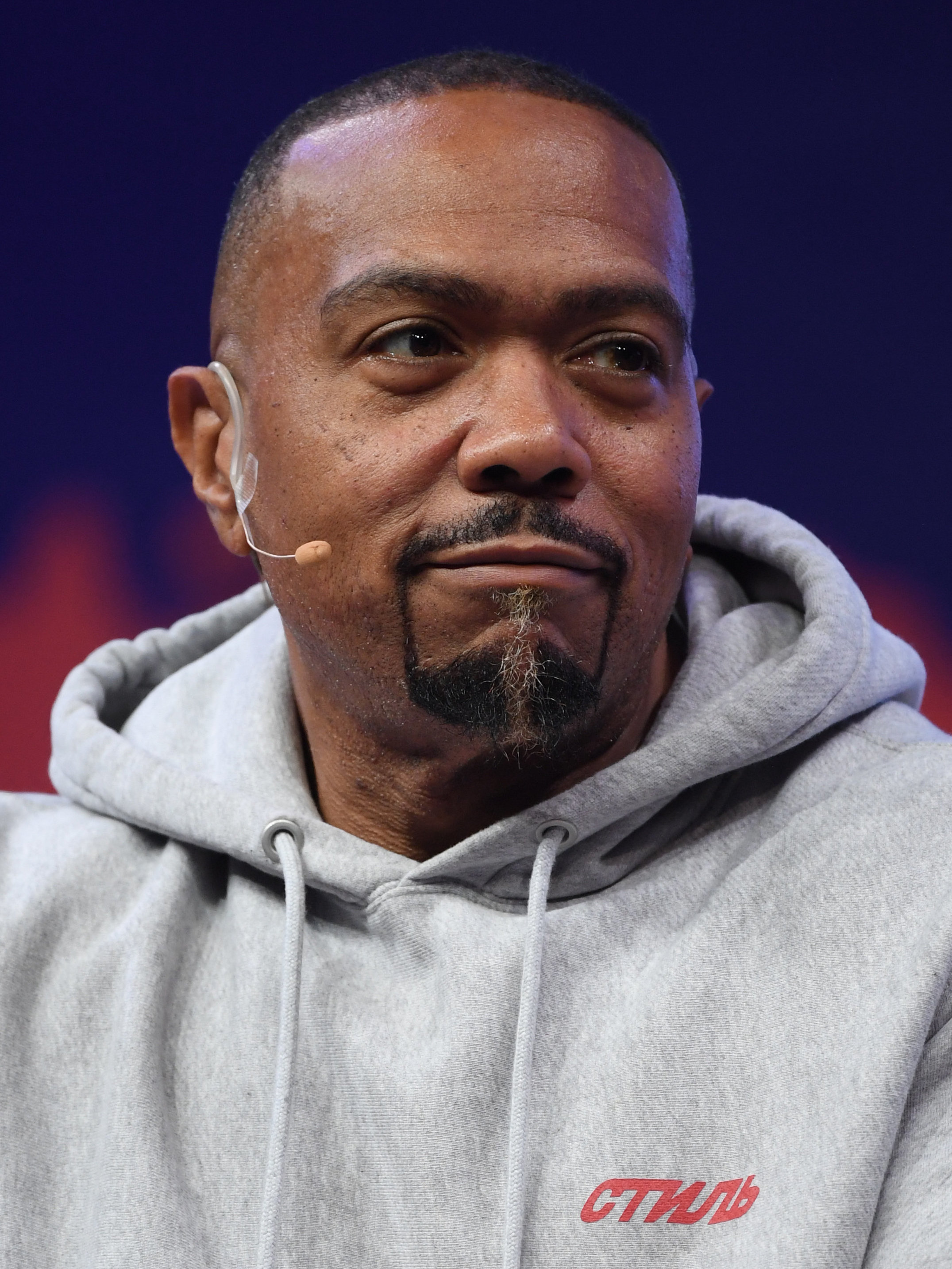
Perry collaborated with Timbaland on "If We Ever Meet Again".

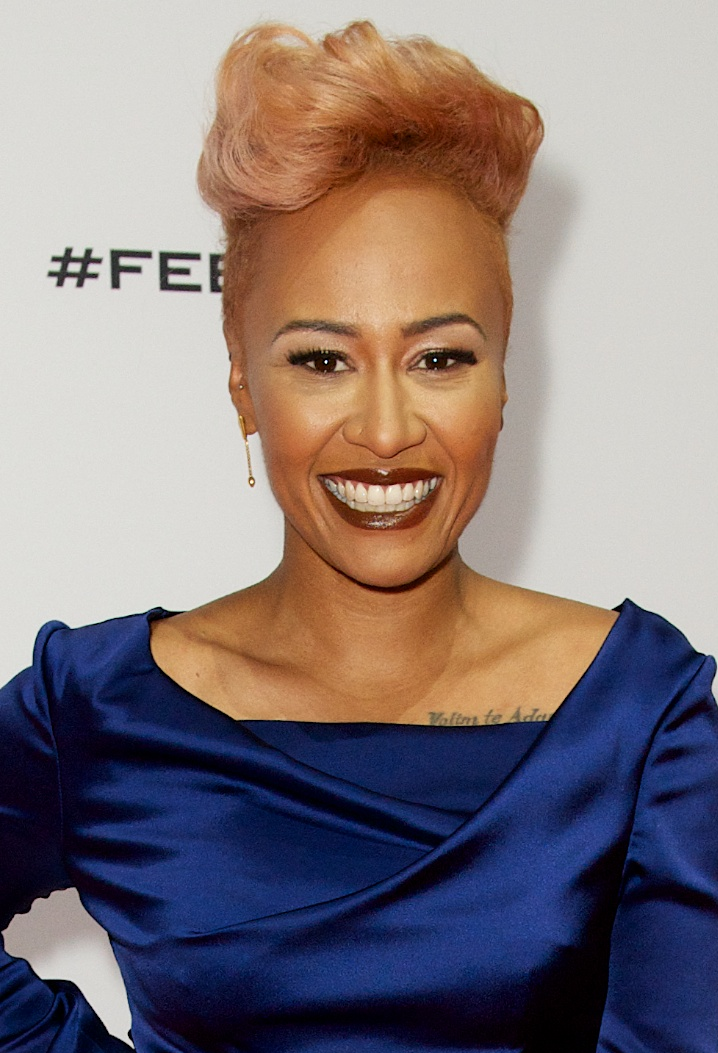
Emeli Sandé co-wrote the song "It Takes Two".

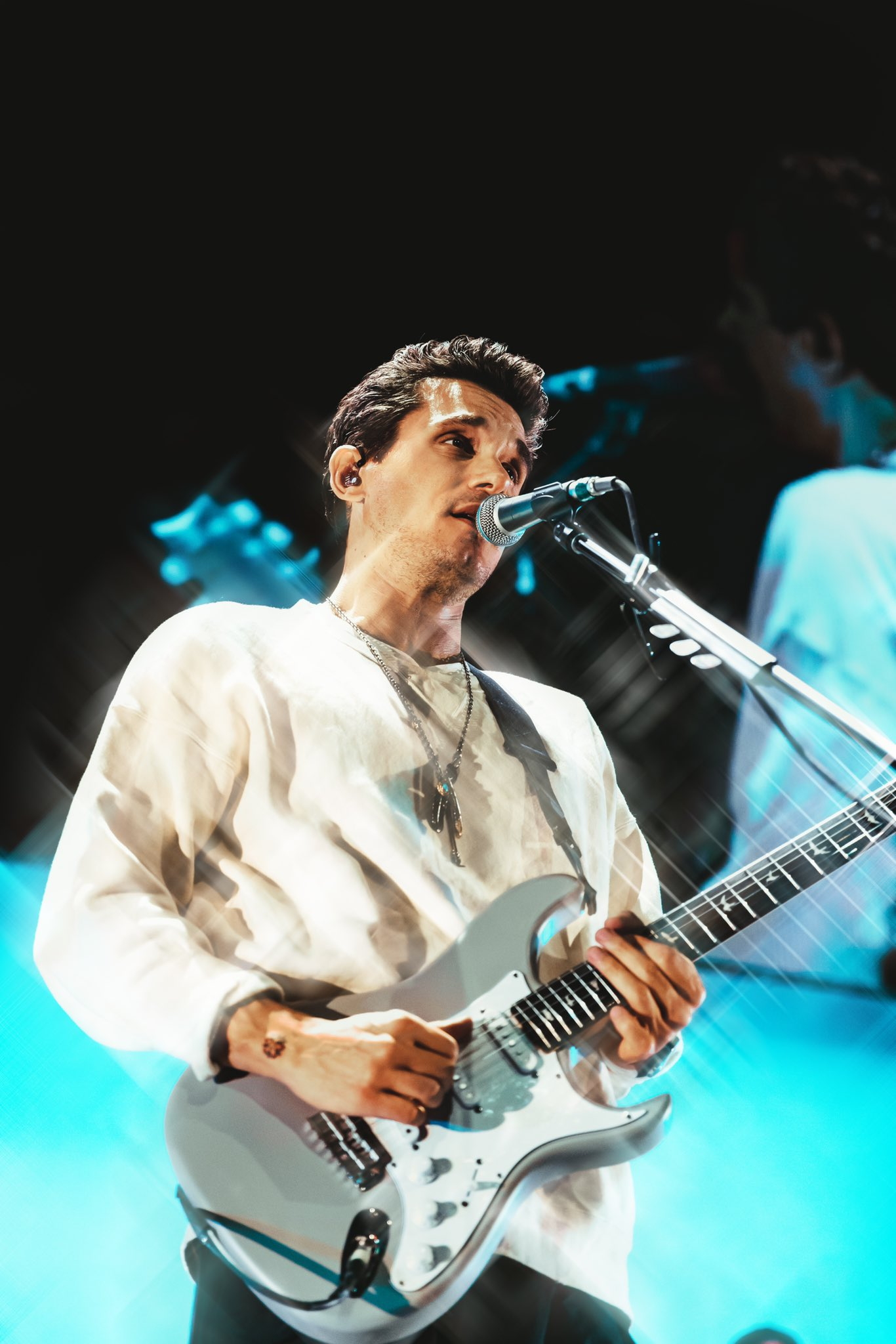
John Mayer collaborated with Perry on "Who You Love", and he co-wrote "Spiritual".

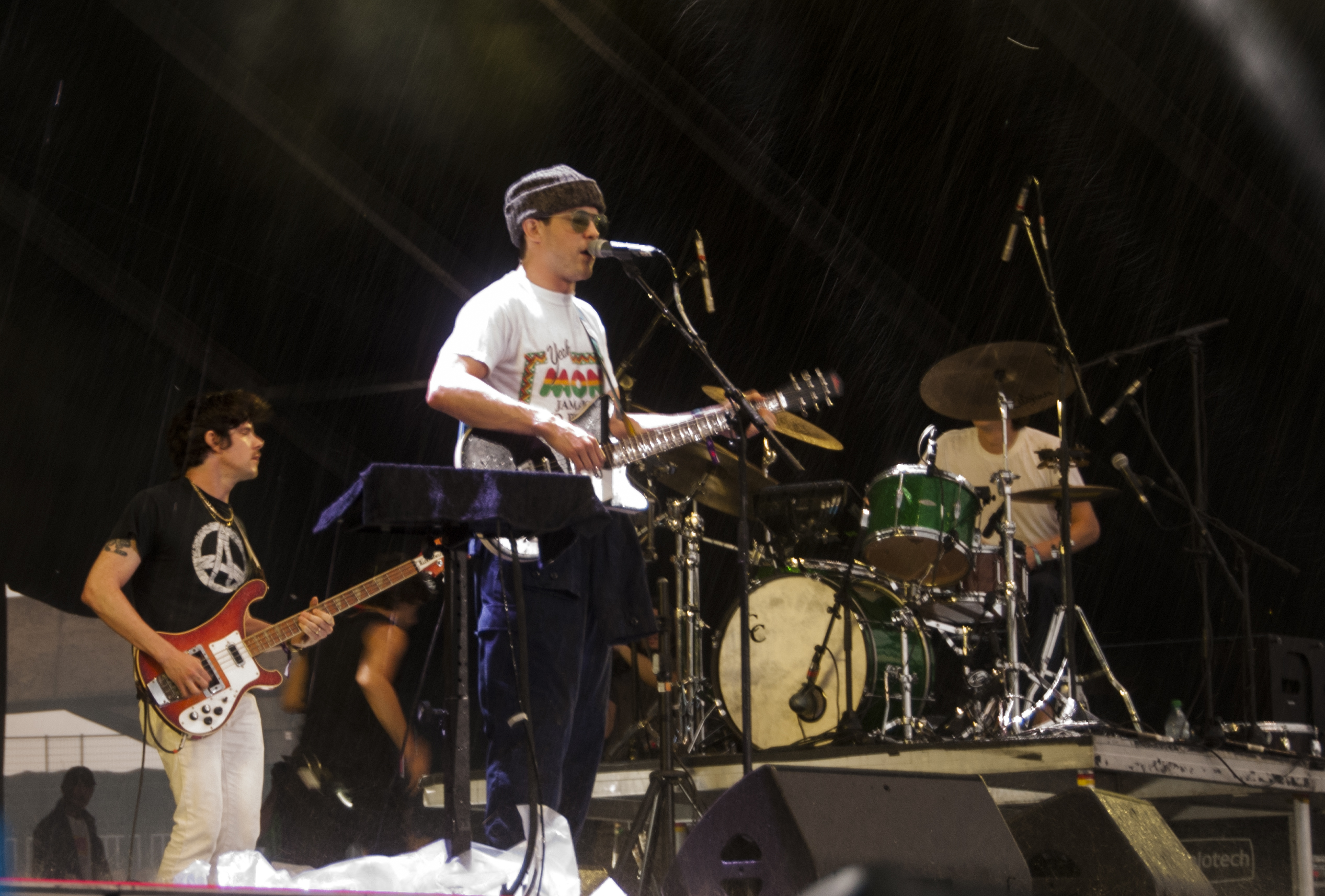
Perry has covered MGMT's "Electric Feel".

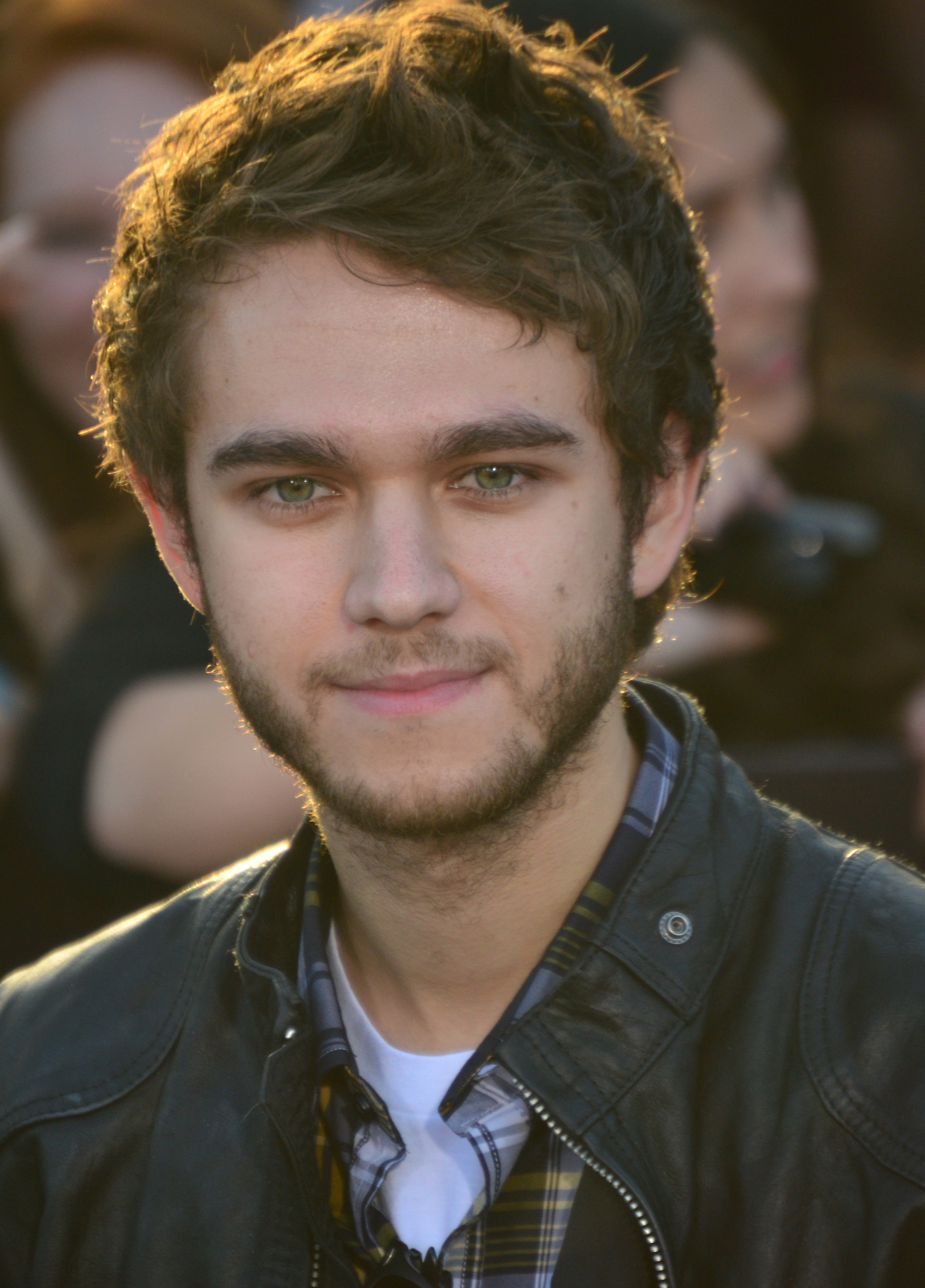
Zedd collaborated and co-wrote "365" with Perry, and he co-wrote and co-produced "Never Really Over".

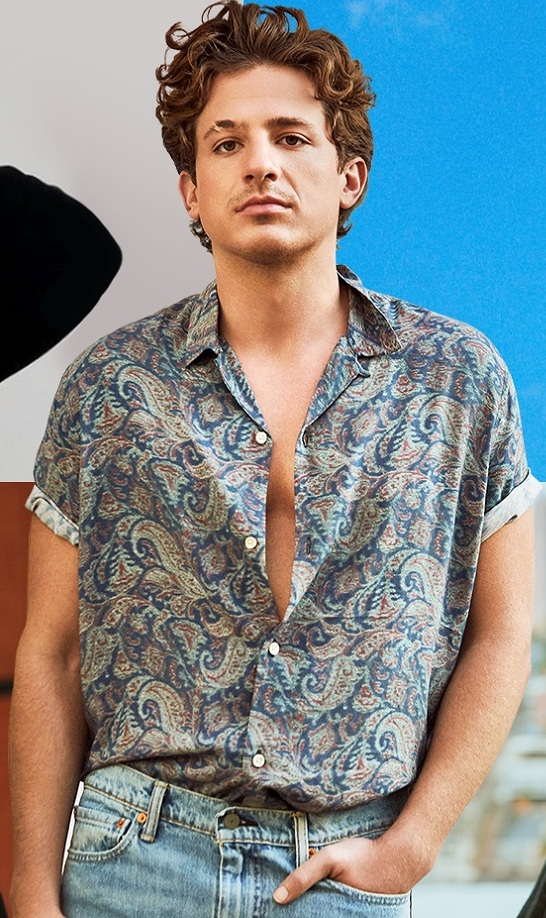
Charlie Puth co-wrote and co-produced the song "Small Talk" and "Harleys in Hawaii".

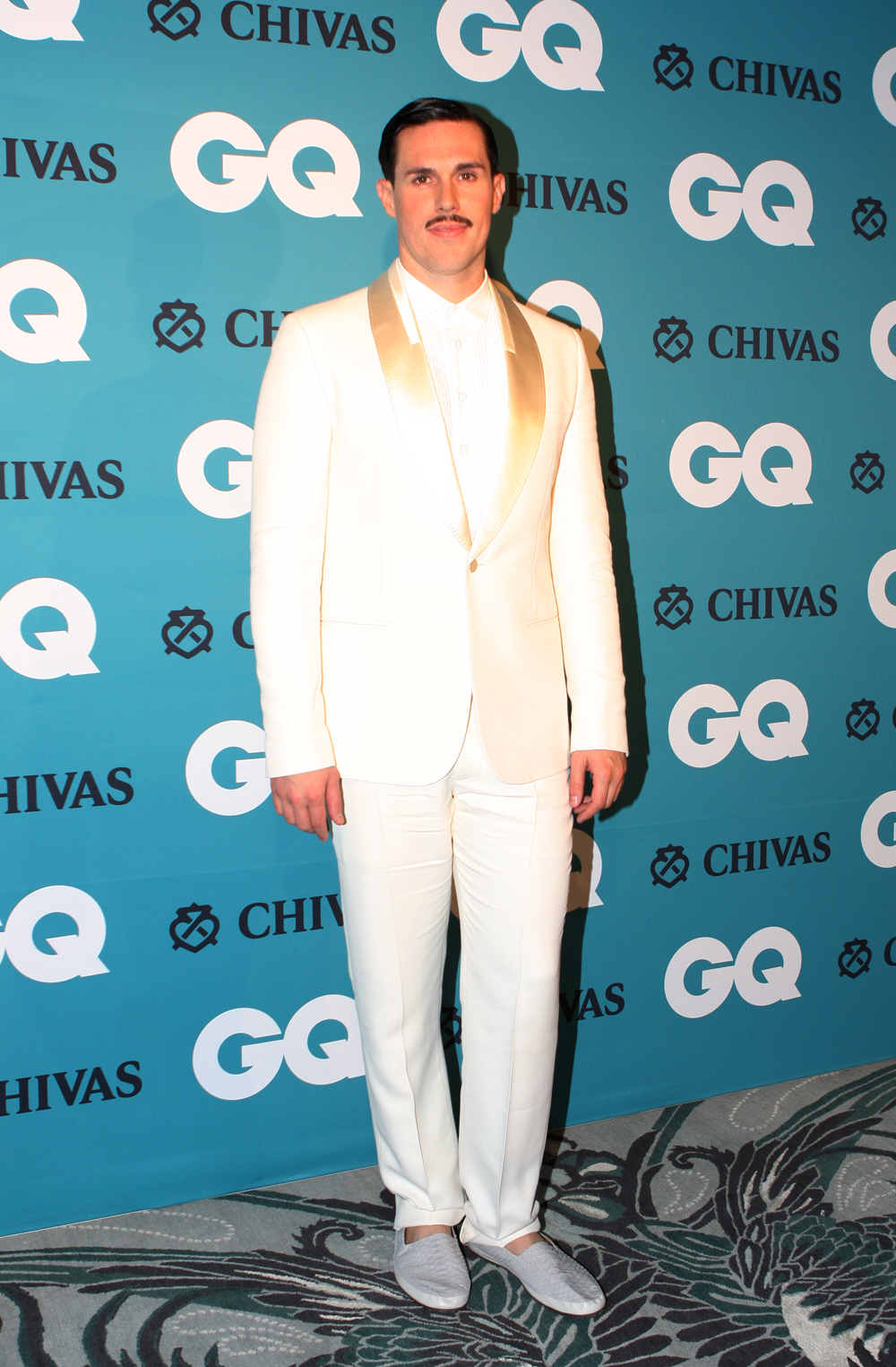
Perry has covered Sam Sparro's "Black and Gold".

Key
| ‡ | Indicates song written solely by Katy Perry |

Name of song, writers, originating album, and year released.
| Song | Writer(s) | Album | Year | Ref. |
|---|---|---|---|---|
| "365" (with Zedd) | Anton Zaslavski; Katy Perry; Caroline Ailin; Corey Sanders; Daniel Davidsen; Mich Hansen; Peter Wallevik | Non-album single | 2019 | |
| "Act My Age" | Katy Perry; Ilya Salmanzadeh; Rationale; Mark Crew | Witness | 2017 | |
| “All You Need Is Love” | Lennon–McCartney | Non-Album Single | 2021 | |
| "All the Love" | Katy Perry; Aaron Joseph; Ferras Alqaisi; Keegan Bach; Lukasz Gottwald; Ryan Ogren; Vaughn Oliver | 143 | 2024 | |
| "Artificial" (featuring JID) | Katy Perry; Aaron Joseph; Chloe Angelides; Destin Route; Keegan Bach; Lukasz Gottwald; Rocco Valdes; Samuel Catalano; Sarah Hudson | 143 | 2024 | |
| "Bandaids" | Katy Perry; Justin Tranter; Sean Cook; Russ Chell; Eren Cannata; Kiddo Ibañez | Non-album single | 2025 | |
| "Bigger than Me" | Katy Perry; Sarah Hudson; Corin Roddick & Megan James; Oscar Holter | Witness | 2017 | |
| "Birthday" | Katy Perry; Lukasz Gottwald; Max Martin; Bonnie McKee; Henry Walter | Prism | 2013 | |
| "Black and Gold" | Sam Falson; Jesse Rogg | One of the Boys (Platinum Australian Tour Edition); The Hello Katy Australian Tour EP | 2008 | |
| "Bon Appétit" (featuring Migos) | Katy Perry; Migos; Max Martin; Shellback; Oscar Holter; Ferras Alqaisi | Witness | 2017 | |
| "Brick by Brick" | Katy Perry; Greg Wells | MTV Unplugged | 2009 | |
| "By the Grace of God" | Katy Perry; Greg Wells | Prism | 2013 | |
| "California Gurls" (featuring Snoop Dogg) | Katy Perry; Lukasz Gottwald; Max Martin; Bonnie McKee; Calvin Broadus | Teenage Dream | 2010 | |
| "Chained to the Rhythm" (featuring Skip Marley) | Katy Perry; Skip Marley; Sia Furler; Max Martin; Ali Payami | Witness | 2017 | |
| "Champagne Problems" | Katy Perry; Ian Kirkpatrick; Jacob Kasher Hindlin; Johan Carlsson; John Ryan | Smile | 2020 | |
| "Choose Your Battles" | Katy Perry; Greg Wells; Jonatha Brooke | Prism | 2013 | |
| "Circle the Drain" | Katy Perry; Christopher "Tricky" Stewart; Monte Neuble | Teenage Dream | 2010 | |
| "Con Calma" (Remix) | Darrin O'Brien; Edmond Daryll Leary; Juan Salinas; Katy Perry; Michael Grier; Oscar Salinas; Ramon Ayala; Shawn Leigh Moltke; Terri Moltke | Non-album single | 2019 | |
| "Cozy Little Christmas" | Katy Perry; Greg Wells; Ferras Alqaisi | Non-album single | 2018 | |
| "Crush" | Katy Perry; Dallas Koehlke; Emily Warren; Keegan Bach; Lukasz Gottwald; Rocco Valdes; Ryan Ogren; Sarah Hudson; Scott Harris; Theron Thomas | 143 | 2024 | |
| "Cry About It Later" | Katy Perry; Noonie Bao; Oscar Holter; Sasha Sloan | Smile | 2020 | |
| "A Cup of Coffee" | Katy Perry; Glen Ballard; Matt Thiessen | One of the Boys | 2008 | |
| "Daisies" | Katy Perry; Jon Bellion; Jacob Kasher Hindlin; Michael Pollack; Jordan K. Johnson; Stefan Johnson | Smile | 2020 | |
| "Daisy Bell (Bicycle Built for Two)" | Harry Dacre | The Gay Nineties Old Tyme Music: Daisy Bell | 2014 | |
| "Dance With the Devil" | Katy Perry; Felix Snow | Witness | 2017 | |
| "Dark Horse" (featuring Juicy J) | Katy Perry; Lukasz Gottwald; Max Martin; Henry Walter; Sarah Theresa Hudson; Jordan Houston | Prism | 2013 | |
| "Déjà Vu" | Katy Perry; Hayden James; Ferras; Thomas Stell | Witness | 2017 | |
| "Double Rainbow" | Katy Perry; Sia Furler; Greg Kurstin | Prism | 2013 | |
| "Dressin' Up" | Katy Perry; Christopher "Tricky" Stewart; Monte Neuble; Matt Thiessen | Teenage Dream: The Complete Confection | 2012 | |
| "Electric" | Katy Perry ‡ | Promotional single release for Pokémon's "Pokémon25" | 2021 | |
| "Electric Feel" | Andrew VanWyngarden; Ben Goldwasser; Will Berman | One of the Boys (Platinum Australian Tour Edition); The Hello Katy Australian Tour EP | 2008 | |
| "E.T." | Katy Perry; Lukasz Gottwald; Max Martin; Joshua Coleman | Teenage Dream | 2010 | |
| "Every Day Is a Holiday" | Katy Perry ‡ | Promotional single release for H&M's Christmas campaign | 2015 | |
| "Faith Won't Fail" | Katy Perry; Mark Dickson | Katy Hudson | 2001 | |
| "Feels" | Adam Wiles; Pharrell Williams; Brittany Hazzard; Katy Perry; Big Sean | Funk Wav Bounces Vol. 1 | 2017 | |
| "Fingerprints" | Katy Perry; Greg Wells | One of the Boys | 2008 | |
| "Firework" | Katy Perry; Ester Dean; Sandy Wilhelm; Mikkel Storleer Eriksen & Tor Erik Hermansen | Teenage Dream | 2010 | |
| "Ghost" | Katy Perry; Lukasz Gottwald; Max Martin; Bonnie McKee; Henry Walter | Prism | 2013 | |
| "Gimme Gimme" (featuring 21 Savage) | Katy Perry; Ferras Alqaisi; Gamal Lewis; Lukasz Gottwald; Rocco Valdes; Ryan Ogren; Shéyaa Bin Abraham-Joseph; Theron Thomas | 143 | 2024 | |
| "Gorgeous" (featuring Kim Petras) | Katy Perry; Aaron Joseph; Chloe Angelides; Devin Wilkes; Kim Petras; Lukasz Gottwald; Malibu Babie; Max Martin; Rocco Valdes; Vaughn Oliver | 143 | 2024 | |
| "Growing Pains" | Katy Perry; Mark Dickson | Katy Hudson | 2001 | |
| "Hackensack" | Chris Collingwood; Adam Schlesinger | MTV Unplugged | 2009 | |
| "Harleys in Hawaii" | Katy Perry; Johan Carlsson; Charlie Puth; Jacob Kasher Hindlin | Smile | 2019 | |
| "Has a Heart" | Katy Perry; Lukasz Gottwald; LunchMoney Lewis; Rocco Valdes; Ryan Ogren; Vaughn Oliver | 1432 (Note: 1432 is a deluxe version of 143 containing four additional tracks not featured on the standard edition.) | 2024 | |
| "Hey Hey Hey" | Katy Perry; Max Martin; Sia Furler; Ali Payami; Sarah Hudson | Witness | 2017 | |
| "High On Your Supply" | Katy Perry; Ryan Tedder | Smile | 2020 | |
| "Hot n Cold" | Katy Perry; Lukasz Gottwald; Max Martin | One of the Boys | 2008 | |
| "Hummingbird Heartbeat" | Katy Perry; Christopher "Tricky" Stewart; Monte Neuble; Stacy Barthe | Teenage Dream | 2010 | |
| "I Kissed a Girl" | Katy Perry; Lukasz Gottwald; Max Martin; Cathy Dennis | One of the Boys | 2008 | |
| "I Think I'm Ready" | Katy Perry; Ted Bruner | One of the Boys (Platinum Australian Tour Edition); The Hello Katy Australian Tour EP | 2008 | |
| "I Woke Up" | Katy Perry; Lukasz Gottwald; LunchMoney Lewis; Rocco Valdes; Ryan Ogren; Sarah Hudson; Theron Thomas; Vaughn Oliver | 1432 | 2024 | |
| "If You Can Afford Me" | Katy Perry; Dave Katz; Sam Hollander | One of the Boys | 2008 | |
| "If We Ever Meet Again" (Timbaland featuring Katy Perry) | Timothy Mosley; James Washington; Michael Busbee | Shock Value II | 2010 | |
| "I'm His, He's Mine"(featuring Doechii) | Katy Perry; Crystal Waters; Ferras Alqaisi; Jaylah Hickmon; Lukasz Gottwald; LunchMoney Lewis; Neal Conway; Rocco Valdes; Ryan Ogren; Theron Thomas | 143 | 2024 | |
| "I'm Still Breathing" | Katy Perry; David A. Stewart; Matt Thiessen | One of the Boys | 2008 | |
| "Immortal Flame" | Katy Perry; Sarah Hudson; Ferras | Song recorded for Final Fantasy Brave Exvius video game | 2018 | |
| "International Smile" | Katy Perry; Lukasz Gottwald; Max Martin; Henry Walter | Prism | 2013 | |
| "Into Me You See" | Katy Perry; Alexis Taylor; Joe Goddard; Ferras | Witness | 2017 | |
| "It Takes Two" | Katy Perry; Benjamin Levin; Emeli Sandé; Mikkel Storleer Eriksen & Tor Erik Hermansen | Prism | 2013 | |
| "Last Call" | Katy Perry ‡ | Katy Hudson | 2001 | |
| "Last Friday Night (T.G.I.F.)" | Katy Perry; Lukasz Gottwald; Max Martin; Bonnie McKee | Teenage Dream | 2010 | |
| "Legendary Lovers" | Katy Perry; Lukasz Gottwald; Max Martin; Bonnie McKee; Henry Walter | Prism | 2013 | |
| "Legends Never Die" (Ferras featuring Katy Perry) | Greg Wells; Ferras Alqaisi; Sarah Theresa Hudson | Ferras | 2014 | |
| "Lifetimes" | Katy Perry; Lukasz Gottwald; LunchMoney Lewis; Rocco Valdes; Ryan Ogren; Sarah Hudson; Theron Thomas; Vaughn Oliver | 143 | 2024 | |
| "Lost" | Katy Perry; Ted Bruner | Ur So Gay (EP); One of the Boys | 2007 | |
| "Love Me" | Katy Perry; Max Martin; Christian "Bloodshy" Karlsson; Vincent Pontare; Magnus Lidehäll | Prism | 2013 | |
| "Mannequin" | Katy Perry ‡ | One of the Boys | 2008 | |
| "Mind Maze" | Katy Perry; Ali Payami; Corin Roddick & Megan James; Sarah Hudson | Witness | 2017 | |
| "Miss You More" | Katy Perry; Ali Payami; Corin Roddick & Megan James; Sarah Hudson | Witness | 2017 | |
| "My Own Monster" | Katy Perry ‡ | Katy Hudson | 2001 | |
| "Naturally" | Katy Perry; Scott Faircloff | Katy Hudson | 2001 | |
| "Never Really Over" | Katy Perry; Dagny Sandvik; Michelle Buzz; Jason Gill; Gino Barletta; Hayley Warner; Anton Zaslavski; Leah Haywood; Daniel James | Smile | 2019 | |
| "Never Worn White" | Katy Perry | Smile - Fan Edition | 2020 | |
| "Nirvana" | Katy Perry; Aaron Joseph; Dallas Koehlke; Emily Warren; Keegan Bach; Luksaz Gottwald; Rocco Valdes; Ryan Ogren; Sarah Hudson; Scott Harris; Theron Thomas; Vaughn Oliver | 143 | 2024 | |
| "No Tears For New Years" | Katy Perry; Lukasz Gottwald; Ferras Alqaisi; Rocco Valdes; Ryan Ogren; Theron Thomas | 1432 | 2024 | |
| "Not Like the Movies" | Katy Perry; Greg Wells | Teenage Dream | 2010 | |
| "Not the End of the World" | Katy Perry; Andrew Goldstein; Jacob Kasher Hindlin; Madison Love; Michael Pollack | Smile | 2020 | |
| "One of the Boys" | Katy Perry ‡ | One of the Boys | 2008 | |
| "OK" | Katy Perry; Lukasz Gottwald; Aaron Joseph; Chloe Angelides; Ferras Alqaisi; Lusamba Vanessa Kalala; Ryan Ogren; Vaughn Oliver | 1432 | 2024 | |
| "Only Love" | Katy Perry; Andrew Jackson; Sophie Cooke | Smile | 2020 | |
| "Part of Me" | Katy Perry; Lukasz Gottwald; Max Martin; Bonnie McKee | Teenage Dream: The Complete Confection | 2012 | |
| "Peacock" | Katy Perry; Ester Dean; Mikkel Storleer Eriksen & Tor Erik Hermansen | Teenage Dream | 2010 | |
| "Pearl" | Katy Perry; Greg Wells | Teenage Dream | 2010 | |
| "Pendulum" | Katy Perry; Jeff Bhasker; Sarah Hudson | Witness | 2017 | |
| "Piercing" | Katy Perry; Brian White; Tommy Collier | Katy Hudson | 2001 | |
| "Power" | Katy Perry; Jack Garratt | Witness | 2017 | |
| "Resilient" | Katy Perry; Ferras Alqaisi; Mikkel Storleer Eriksen & Tor Erik Hermansen | Smile | 2020 | |
| "Rise" | Katy Perry; Max Martin; Savan Kotecha; Ali Payami | Non-album single | 2016 | |
| "Roar" | Katy Perry; Lukasz Gottwald; Max Martin; Bonnie McKee; Henry Walter | Prism | 2013 | |
| "Roulette" | Katy Perry; Max Martin; Ali Payami; Shellback; Ferras | Witness | 2017 | |
| "Save as Draft" | Katy Perry; Elof Loelv; Noonie Bao; DJ Mustard; Max Martin; Twice As Nice | Witness | 2017 | |
| "Search Me" | Katy Perry; Scott Faircloff | Katy Hudson | 2001 | |
| "Self Inflicted" | Katy Perry; Anne Preven; Scott Cutler | One of the Boys | 2008 | |
| "Simple" | Katy Perry; Glen Ballard | The Sisterhood of the Traveling Pants | 2005 | |
| "Small Talk" | Katy Perry; Charlie Puth; Johan Carlsson; Jacob Kasher Hindlin | Smile - Fan Edition | 2019 | |
| "Smile" | Katy Perry; Benny Golson; Brittany Hazzard; Ferras Alqaisi; Oliver Goldstein; Josh Abraham; Anthony Criss; Kier Gist; Vincent Brown | Smile | 2020 | |
| "Smile" (featuring Diddy) | Katy Perry; Benny Golson; Brittany Hazzard; Ferras Alqaisi; Oliver Goldstein; Josh Abraham; Anthony Criss; Kier Gist; Vincent Brown; Sean Combs; Cordae Dunston | Smile - Vinyl Edition | 2020 | |
| "Spiritual" | Katy Perry; John Mayer; Greg Kurstin | Prism | 2013 | |
| "Spit" | Katy Perry ‡ | Katy Hudson | 2001 | |
| "Starstrukk" (3OH!3 featuring Katy Perry) | Nathaniel Motte & Sean Foreman | Want | 2009 | |
| "Swish Swish" (featuring Nicki Minaj) | Katy Perry; Onika Miraj; Adam Dyment; Sarah Hudson; Brittany Hazzard | Witness | 2017 | |
| "Teary Eyes" | Katy Perry; Andrew Goldstein; Jacob Kasher Hindlin; Madison Love; Michael Pollack | Smile | 2020 | |
| "Teenage Dream" | Katy Perry; Lukasz Gottwald; Max Martin; Bonnie McKee; Benjamin Levin | Teenage Dream | 2010 | |
| "Truth" | Katy Perry; LunchMoney Lewis; Lukasz Gottwald; Rocco Valdes; Ryan Ogren; Sarah Hudson; Vaughn Oliver | 143 | 2024 | |
| "Tucked" | Katy Perry; Ferras Alqaisi; Jacob Kasher Hindlin; Johan Carlsson; John Ryan | Smile | 2020 | |
| "The One That Got Away" | Katy Perry; Lukasz Gottwald; Max Martin | Teenage Dream | 2010 | |
| "Thinking of You" | Katy Perry ‡ | One of the Boys | 2008 | |
| "This Is How We Do" | Katy Perry; Max Martin; Klas Åhlund | Prism | 2013 | |
| "This Moment" | Katy Perry; Benjamin Levin; Mikkel Storleer Eriksen & Tor Erik Hermansen | Prism | 2013 | |
| "Trust in Me" | Katy Perry; Mark Dickson | Katy Hudson | 2001 | |
| "Tsunami" | Katy Perry; Mike Will Made It; Scooly; Sarah Hudson; Mia Moretti | Witness | 2017 | |
| "Ur So Gay" | Katy Perry; Greg Wells | Ur So Gay (EP); One of the Boys | 2007 | |
| "Unconditionally" | Katy Perry; Lukasz Gottwald; Max Martin; Henry Walter | Prism | 2013 | |
| "Use Your Love" (Note: "Use Your Love" is largely a cover of "Your Love" by The Outfield and written by John Spinks.) | John Spinks; Katy Perry | Ur So Gay (EP) | 2007 | |
| "Waking Up in Vegas" | Katy Perry; Andreas Carlsson; Desmond Child | One of the Boys | 2008 | |
| "Watch It Burn" | Katy Perry Justin Tranter, Jason Gill, Eren Cannata, Amanda "Kiddo" Ibanez, Skyler Stonestreet, and Daniel (Dan) Crean | Non-album single | 2026 | |
| "Waving Through a Window" | Benj Pasek; Justin Paul | Dear Evan Hansen (deluxe edition) | 2018 | |
| "Walking on Air" | Katy Perry; Max Martin; Klas Åhlund; Adam Baptiste; Camela Leierth | Prism | 2013 | |
| "What Makes a Woman" | Katy Perry; Jacob Kasher Hindlin; Johan Carlsson; John Ryan; Sarah Hudson | Smile | 2020 | |
| "When There's Nothing Left" | Katy Perry ‡ | Katy Hudson | 2001 | |
| "White Christmas" | Irving Berlin | Winter Songs | 2008 | |
| "Who Am I Living For?" | Katy Perry; Christopher "Tricky" Stewart; Monte Neuble; Brian Telestai | Teenage Dream | 2010 | |
| "Who You Love" (John Mayer featuring Katy Perry) | John Mayer; Katy Perry | Paradise Valley | 2013 | |
| "Wide Awake" | Katy Perry; Lukasz Gottwald; Max Martin; Bonnie McKee; Henry Walter | Teenage Dream: The Complete Confection | 2012 | |
| "Witness" | Katy Perry; Max Martin; Savan Kotecha; Ali Payami | Witness | 2017 | |
| "Woman's World" | Katy Perry; Łukasz Gottwald; Vaughn Oliver; Aaron Joseph; Rocco Valdes; Chloe Angelides | 143 | 2024 | |
| "Wonder" | Katy Perry; Cato Sundberg; Ferras Alqaisi; Henry Walter; Kent Sundberg; Mikkel S. Eriksen; Tor Erik Hermansen | 143 | 2024 | |
