= Never Really Over =

2019 single by Katy Perry

Single by Katy Perry
- A-side: "Small Talk" (double A-side)
- Released: May 31, 2019
- Studio: Studios 301 (Sydney); Westlake Recording Studios (Los Angeles); Unsub Studios (Los Angeles)
- Genre: Electropop; dance-pop
- Length: 3:43
- Label: Capitol
- Songwriters: Katy Perry; Anton Zaslavski; Daniel James; Leah Haywood; Dagny Norvoll Sandvik; Gino Barletta; Michelle Buzz; Jason Gill; Hayley Warner
- Producers: Zedd; Dreamlab

Katy Perry singles chronology
"Con Calma" (remix) (2019)	"Never Really Over" (2019)	"Small Talk" (2019)

Music video
- "Never Really Over" on YouTube

"Never Really Over" is a song by the American singer-songwriter Katy Perry, released on May 31, 2019, by Capitol Records. The song was later included on her sixth studio album, Smile (2020), as its first track. The song was written by Perry, alongside Gino Baletta, Hayley Warner, alongside the song's producers, Zedd and Dreamlab. The song was recorded at Westlake Recording Studios and Unsub Studios, based in Los Angeles, and Studios 301, based in Sydney. It is an electropop track inspired by Norwegian singer Dagny's "Love You Like That" (2017), and thus, the writers of "Love You Like That" are also credited as writers.

The song received critical acclaim for its production and hook. Commercially, it peaked within the top 10 in as Australia, Canada, Croatia, Greece, Hungary, Lebanon, Malaysia, Mexico, the Philippines and Scotland as well as the top 20 in Belgium, the Czech Republic, Estonia, Ireland, Latvia, Lithuania, the Netherlands, New Zealand, Panama, Poland, Singapore, Slovakia, the United Kingdom and the United States. At the APRA Music Awards of 2020, "Never Really Over" was nominated for Most Performed Pop Work of the Year. The song's music video has over 160 million views as of 2025.

== Composition ==
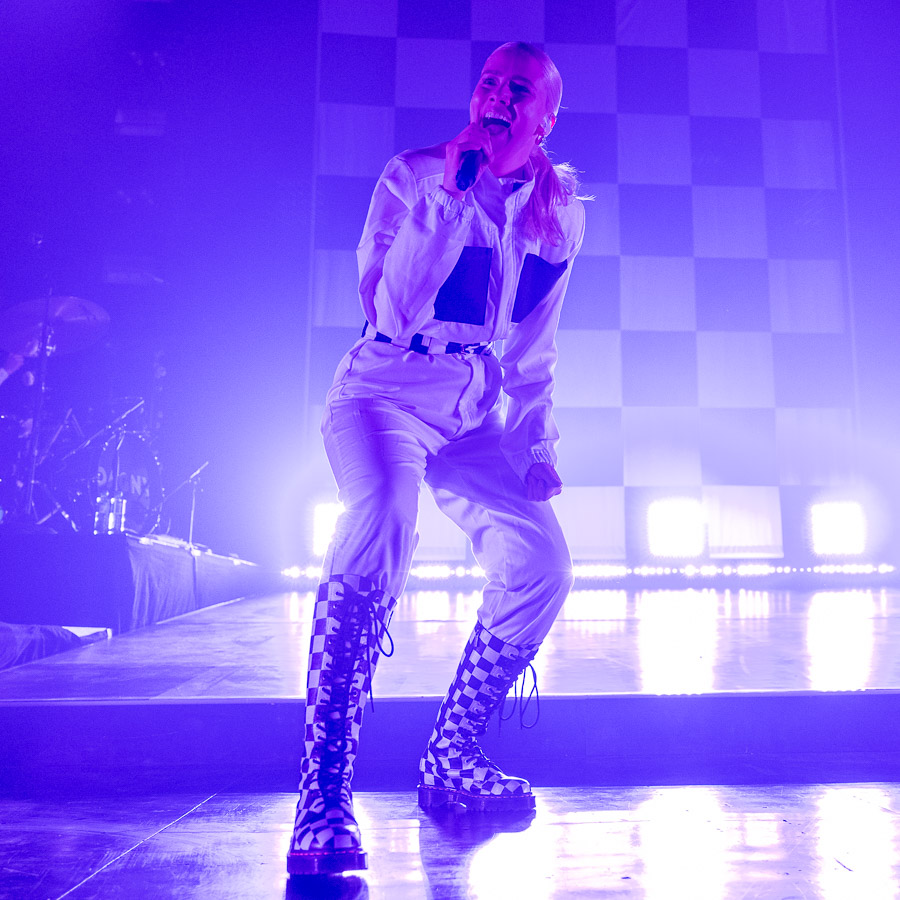
"Never Really Over" is inspired by Dagny's "Love You Like That".

"Never Really Over" is an electropop and dance-pop song that contains a steady bubblegum and house beat, as well as propulsive synth chords. Perry co-wrote the song with Gino Barletta, Hayley Warner and its producers Leah Haywood and Daniel James of Dreamlab, as well as Zedd, with whom Perry previously collaborated on "365". The track is inspired by the 2017 song "Love You Like That", performed by Dagny and written by Dagny, Michelle Buzz and Jason Gill, who all received writing credits for "Never Really Over". Despite their credits, Dagny "never sat down in a room with Katy, or wrote the song for her", but had been contacted by Perry's team in early 2019 and told that "they had been really inspired, and had a song that was like their version of "Love You Like That". It runs for three minutes and 44 seconds and is performed in the key of A♭ major with a tempo of 100 beats per minute.

== Promotion and release ==
On May 27, Universal Music Group first hinted towards a new project when a few selected fans were invited to a "Katy Perry Fan Event" that took place two days later. Perry announced the song and revealed the official artwork on her Instagram on May 28. Its cover shows her with blonde hair and wearing an orange dress. The song was made available for pre-save on Spotify upon announcement. Good Morning America teased the song and the music video on May 30, 2019, before its release the following day.

On November 29, 2019, a Black Friday Record Store Day limited edition 12" orange vinyl was released, pairing the song with Perry's next single "Small Talk".

== Critical reception ==
The song received critical acclaim, with Jillian Mapes of Pitchfork called the song "a promising way forward" for Perry and her best single since 2013's "Walking on Air", appreciating the lyrics for not being "horrendously cheesy (a noted weak spot for Perry and her co-writers)". She wrote that Perry made "bad decisions sound enticing" and hailed it as her "most impressively tongue-tied chorus to date". Chris Willman of Variety shared a similar view, saying the repetition in the chorus "somehow works to the song's tongue-twisting advantage". The A.V. Club's Gwen Ihant wrote that the track "puts Perry right back in earworm territory" and called it an "impressive showcase" of her vocals with an "addictive hook songwriters dream of". In The New York Times, Jon Caramanica described it as "Norwegianish Spotifycore" and a "bubble-pop" song.

The Independent's Roisin O'Connor regarded "Never Really Over" as a "truly gratifying return" for Perry after "a period of misfires", noting that it has "hooks galore and harks back her Teenage Dream days of uplifting, bright pop music." Ilana Kaplan of Rolling Stone favored "the return of her hypnotic vocals" and felt the song "puts Perry back where she belongs: on Sugar Mountain." In his review for Clash, Robin Murray deemed it a "pop jewel". Mikael Wood of the Los Angeles Times compared the song's "willfully imprecise" lyrics and "carefully reverbed" vocals to "Me!" by Taylor Swift, concluding that despite its charms, "Perry is probably no better protected."

== Commercial performance ==
"Never Really Over" debuted at number 15 on the US Billboard Hot 100 with 31,000 pure sales and 15.8 million streams, giving Perry her 19th top 20 song in the country. It also became her highest debut on the chart since "Chained to the Rhythm" in 2017 as well as her fifth highest entrance there overall. On April 26, 2021, the song was certified platinum by the Recording Industry Association of America for equivalent sales of 1,000,000 units in the United States.

In the United Kingdom, the song opened at number 13 on the UK Singles Chart, becoming Perry's 19th top 20 entry in the nation and has since reached number 12. Elsewhere, "Never Really Over" debuted at number 47 in Germany, number seven on Australia's ARIA Singles Chart and at number 19 in New Zealand.

== Music videos ==
A music video, directed by Philippa Price, was released along with the single on May 31, 2019. On May 29, 2019, Perry shared a teaser for the music video with the caption "Let it go..." It amassed more than 17.7 million views within its first day of release. It currently has more than 150 million views. The music video was shot at King Gillette Ranch in Malibu, California.

=== Reception ===
Sal Cinquemani of Slant Magazine praised the style and cinematography of the music video. He called it "a playful and imaginative portrayal of love's intoxicating spell and the lengths some of us will go to exorcise ourselves of it."

The video has been noted for its cultural references to hippie era and artistic similarities to New Age symbolism. Suzy Byrne of Yahoo! noted the video's spiritual themes and called Perry a "New Age goddess". She praised the concept and remarked that it was a "well-choreographed video".

=== Visual album video ===
On August 26, 2020, Perry posted a visual album video of "Never Really Over" to her YouTube channel. It features a first-person view of an animated person living a day at home whilst in the COVID-19 pandemic. Perry has said that the video is based on her "experiences with dishes during quarantine".

== Live performances ==
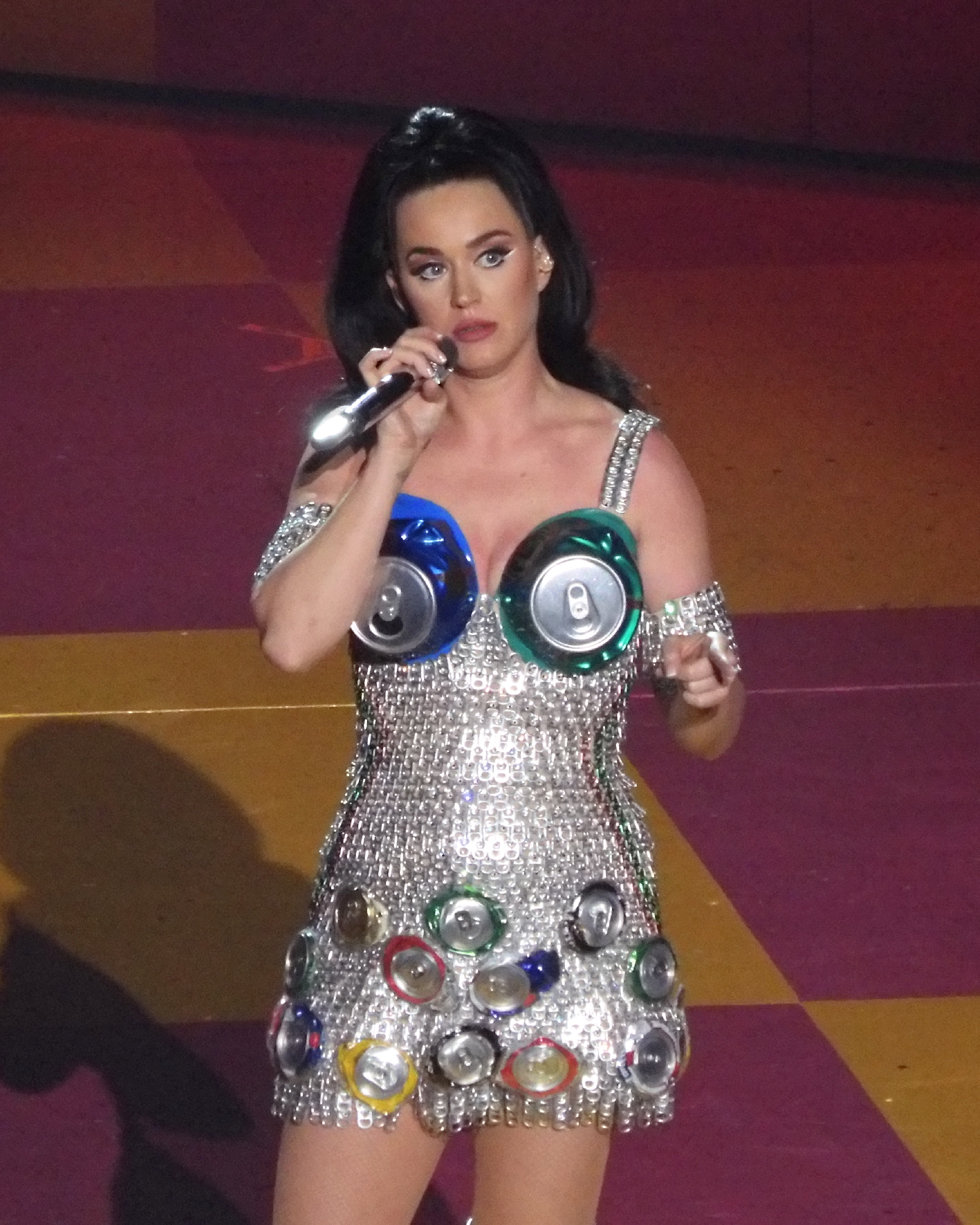
Perry performing "Never Really Over" during her residency Play

On July 15, 2019, Perry uploaded the first live performance of the song in a bathroom on her official Instagram account. On August 20, 2019, she also performed the song at Amazon's Post-Prime Day Concert in Seattle, Washington. Perry also performed the song in May 2020 on Good Morning America as part of their summer concert series.

The song is included on the setlist of Perrys concert residency Play. In January 2022, Perry performed an acoustic version of the song on Saturday Night Live.

== Track listing ==
- Digital download and streaming
1. "Never Really Over" – 3:43
- Digital download and streaming (R3hab remix)
1. "Never Really Over" (R3hab remix) – 3:07
- Digital download and streaming (Syn Cole remix)
1. "Never Really Over" (Syn Cole remix) – 3:08
- Digital download and streaming (Wow & Flutter remix)
1. "Never Really Over" (Wow & Flutter remix) – 6:11
- 12-inch vinyl
1. "Never Really Over" – 3:44
2. "Small Talk" – 2:41

== Credits and personnel ==
Credits adapted from Tidal.

- Katy Perry – vocals
- Zedd – producer, programming, mixer
- Gino Barletta – background vocals
- Hayley Warner – background vocals
- Leah Haywood – background vocals, producer, programming
- Dave Kutch – mastering engineer
- Daniel James – producer, programming
- Ryan Shanahan – engineer, additional mixer
- Brian Cruz – assistant recording engineer

== Charts ==
=== Weekly charts ===
Weekly chart performance
Chart (2019)	Peak position
Argentina (Argentina Hot 100)	76
Australia (ARIA)	7
Austria (Ö3 Austria Top 40)	29
Belgium (Ultratop 50 Flanders)	22
Belgium (Ultratop 50 Wallonia)	16
Canada Hot 100 (Billboard)	7
Canada AC (Billboard)	3
Canada Hot AC (Billboard)	8
Canada CHR/Top 40 (Billboard)	8
China Airplay/FL (Billboard)	3
CIS Airplay (TopHit)	137
Croatia (HRT)	5
Czech Republic Airplay (ČNS IFPI)	12
Czech Republic Singles Digital (ČNS IFPI)	22
Denmark (Tracklisten)	36
Ecuador (National-Report)	60
Estonia (Eesti Tipp-40)	18
Euro Digital Song Sales (Billboard)	5
Finland (Suomen virallinen radiolista)	35
France (SNEP)	102
Germany (GfK)	47
Greece (IFPI)	8
Hungary (Rádiós Top 40)	9
Hungary (Single Top 40)	8
Hungary (Stream Top 40)	16
Ireland (IRMA)	11
Italy (FIMI)	32
Japan Hot 100 (Billboard)	32
Latvia (LAIPA)	11
Lithuania (AGATA)	11
Lebanon (Lebanese Top 20)	7
Malaysia (RIM)	8
Mexico (Billboard Mexican Airplay)	4
Netherlands (Dutch Top 40)	17
Netherlands (Single Top 100)	32
New Zealand (Recorded Music NZ)	14
Norway (VG-lista)	24
Panama (Monitor Latino)	15
Philippines (Philippine Hot 100)	10
Poland Airplay (ZPAV)	19
Portugal (AFP)	47
Romania (Airplay 100)	93
San Marino (SMRRTV Top 50)	18
Scottish Singles Sales (Official Charts)	4
Singapore (RIAS)	12
Slovakia Airplay (ČNS IFPI)	17
Slovakia Singles Digital (ČNS IFPI)	13
Slovenia (SloTop50)	22
Spain (Promusicae)	67
Sweden (Sverigetopplistan)	44
Switzerland (Schweizer Hitparade)	21
UK Singles (Official Charts)	12
US Billboard Hot 100	15
US Adult Contemporary (Billboard)	18
US Adult Pop Airplay (Billboard)	10
US Dance Airplay (Billboard)	15
US Dance Club Songs (Billboard)	1
US Pop Airplay (Billboard)	11

=== Year-end charts ===
Year-end chart performance
Chart (2019)	Position
Argentina (Monitor Latino)	47
Australia (ARIA)	78
Belgium (Ultratop Flanders)	66
Belgium (Ultratop Wallonia)	99
Canada (Canadian Hot 100)	64
Hungary (Rádiós Top 40)	99
Panama (Monitor Latino)	98
Tokyo (Tokio Hot 100)	18
US Adult Top 40 (Billboard)	29
US Dance Club Songs (Billboard)	35
US Mainstream Top 40 (Billboard)	46

== Certifications and sales ==
Certifications and sales
Region	Certification	Certified units/sales
Australia (ARIA)	4× Platinum	280,000^{‡}
Austria (IFPI Austria)	Gold	15,000^{‡}
Brazil (Pro-Música Brasil)	Diamond	160,000^{‡}
Canada (Music Canada)	3× Platinum	240,000^{‡}
Denmark (IFPI Danmark)	Gold	45,000^{‡}
Finland	Gold	2,000
France	—	3,700 (Note: Available sales figures in France.)
Italy (FIMI)	Gold	25,000^{‡}
Mexico (AMPROFON)	Gold	30,000^{‡}
Norway (IFPI Norway)	Platinum	60,000^{‡}
New Zealand (RMNZ)	2× Platinum	60,000^{‡}
Poland (ZPAV)	Platinum	20,000^{‡}
Portugal (AFP)	Platinum	10,000^{‡}
Spain (Promusicae)	Gold	30,000^{‡}
United Kingdom (BPI)	Platinum	600,000^{‡}
United States (RIAA)	Platinum	1,000,000^{‡}
Streaming
Greece (IFPI Greece)	Gold	1,000,000^{†}
^{‡} Sales+streaming figures based on certification alone.^{†} Streaming-only figures based on certification alone.

== Release history ==
Release date and formats
Region	Date	Format(s)	Version	Label	Ref.
Various	May 31, 2019	Digital download; streaming	Original	Capitol	
Italy	May 31, 2019	Radio airplay	Original	Universal	
United States	June 3, 2019	Adult contemporary radio; hot adult contemporary radio; modern adult contemporary radio	Original	Capitol	
United States	June 4, 2019	Contemporary hit radio	Original	Capitol	
Various	July 26, 2019	Digital download; streaming	R3hab remix	Capitol	
Various	July 26, 2019	Digital download; streaming	Syn Cole remix	Capitol	
Various	July 26, 2019	Digital download; streaming	Wow & Flutter remix	Capitol	
Europe	November 29, 2019	12-inch vinyl	Original	Capitol	
United States	November 29, 2019	12-inch vinyl	Original	Capitol	

== See also ==
- List of Billboard number-one dance songs of 2019
