= List of Billboard Adult Contemporary number ones of 2018 =

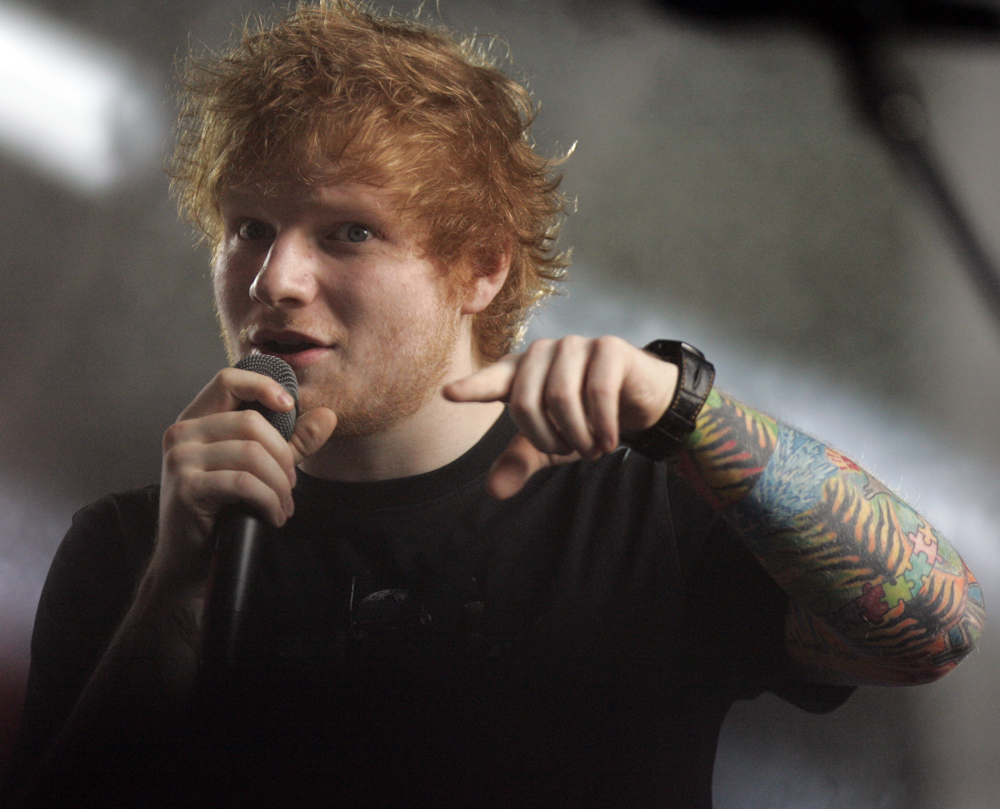
Ed Sheeran spent 22 consecutive weeks at number one with his song "Perfect" which was the longest unbroken run at number one in 2018. In doing so, he became the first artist to have two songs each spend more than 20 weeks at number one on the AC chart.

Adult Contemporary is a chart published by Billboard ranking the top-performing songs in the United States in the adult contemporary music (AC) market. In 2018, nine different songs topped the chart in 53 issues of the magazine, based on weekly airplay data from radio stations compiled by Nielsen Broadcast Data Systems.

On the first chart of the year, the number one position was held by Australian singer Sia with "Santa's Coming for Us", the song's third consecutive week at number one; the following week it was displaced by "There's Nothing Holdin' Me Back" by Canadian vocalist Shawn Mendes, which held the top spot for three weeks. In the issue of Billboard dated February 24, British singer Ed Sheeran's song "Perfect" reached number one, a position it would hold for 22 consecutive weeks. "Perfect" was only the eighth song in the AC chart's history to spend 20 or more weeks at number one, and Sheeran became the first artist to achieve the feat twice, having topped the chart for 24 weeks with "Shape of You" the previous year. As "Shape of You" had been in 2017, "Perfect" was the biggest-selling single of the year in the United States; it was also the most-played song on US radio. Multiple different versions of the song were released, including one featuring Beyoncé, who was jointly credited for part of the song's run atop the magazine's all-genre chart, the Hot 100; on the AC listing, however, only Sheeran was listed.

Beginning in September, Taylor Swift spent ten non-consecutive weeks at number one with "Delicate", her first AC chart-topper for three years. Previous singles from her 2017 album Reputation had been successful on the Hot 100 but had not found favour with adult contemporary radio; "Look What You Made Me Do" topped the Hot 100 but could only reach number 19 on Adult Contemporary. "Delicate" reversed this trend, topping the AC listing while failing to reach the top 10 of the Hot 100. The song's run in the top spot was interrupted in November when the band Maroon 5 spent two weeks at number one with "Girls Like You". Although it spent only two weeks at number one in 2018, "Girls Like You" would return to the top spot in 2019 and hold it for more than 30 weeks, setting a new record for the longest run atop the AC chart by a song. For the final four weeks of the year, the top spot was occupied by Christmas songs, reflecting the general trend in the music played on adult contemporary radio stations in December of each year. John Legend spent three weeks at number one with his version of the 1940s song "Have Yourself a Merry Little Christmas", featuring jazz bassist Esperanza Spalding, before Katy Perry spent the final week of the year atop the chart with "Cozy Little Christmas".

== Chart ==
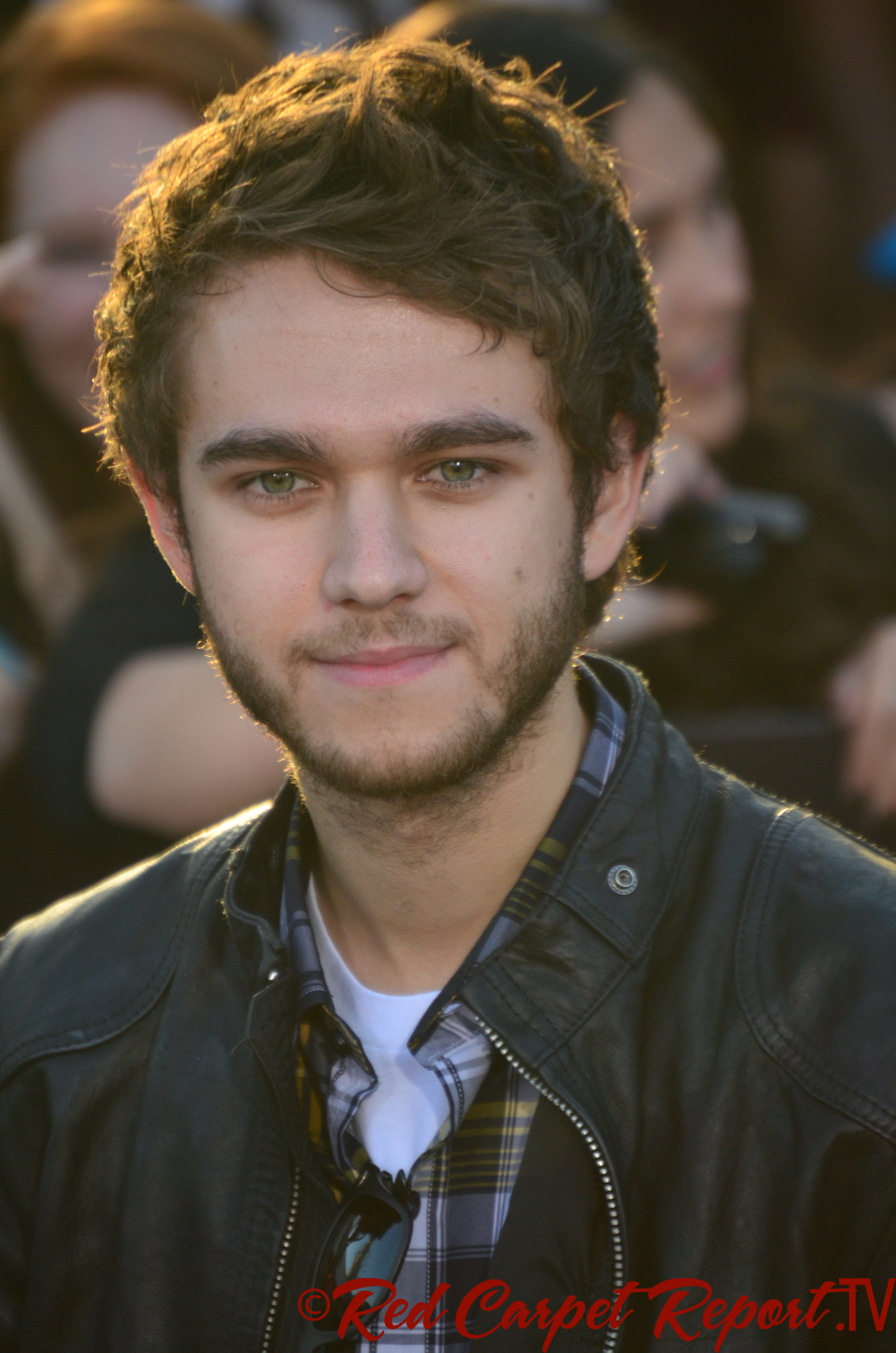
Producer/DJ Zedd topped the chart with "The Middle", featuring Maren Morris and Grey.

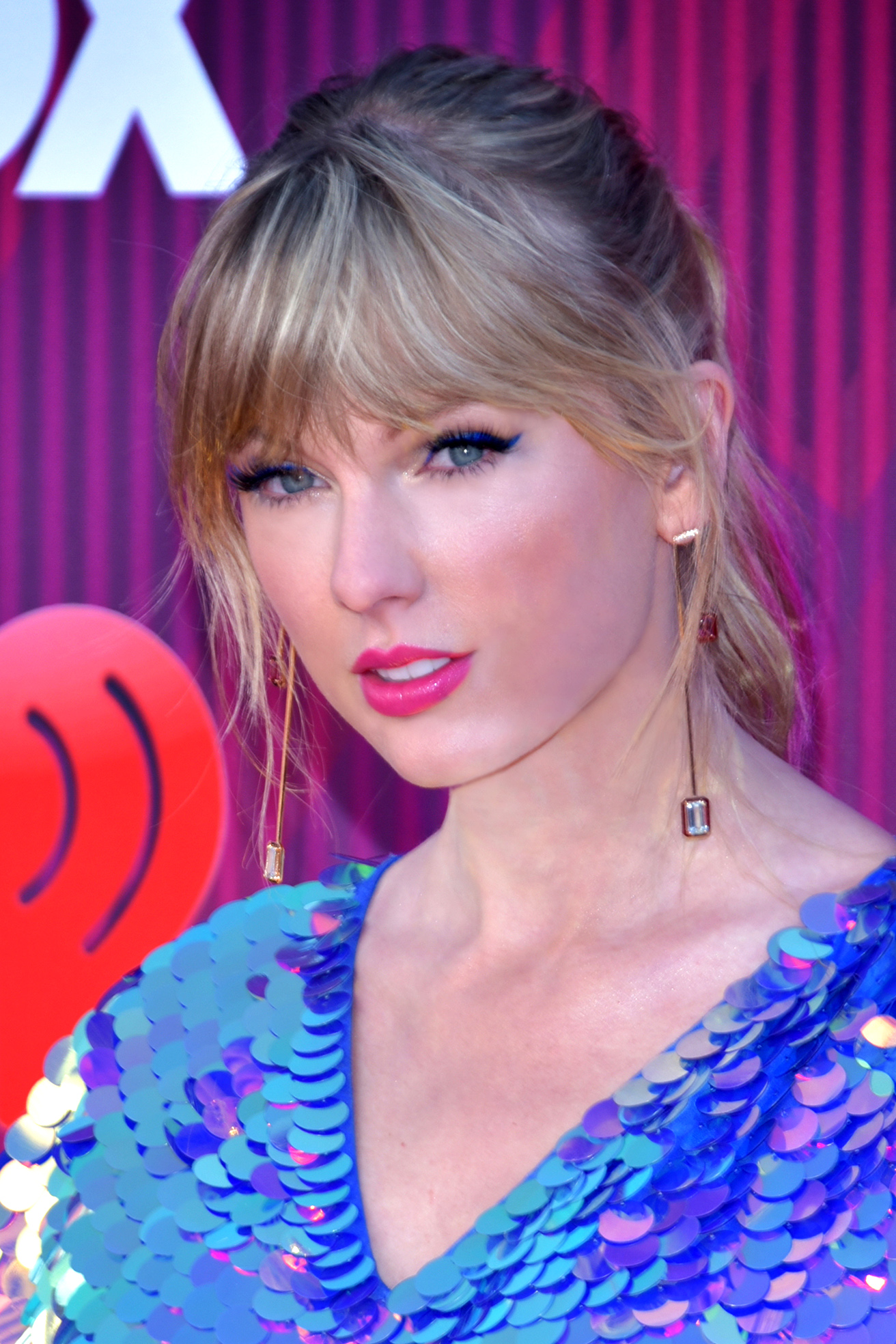
Taylor Swift reached number one in the fall with "Delicate".

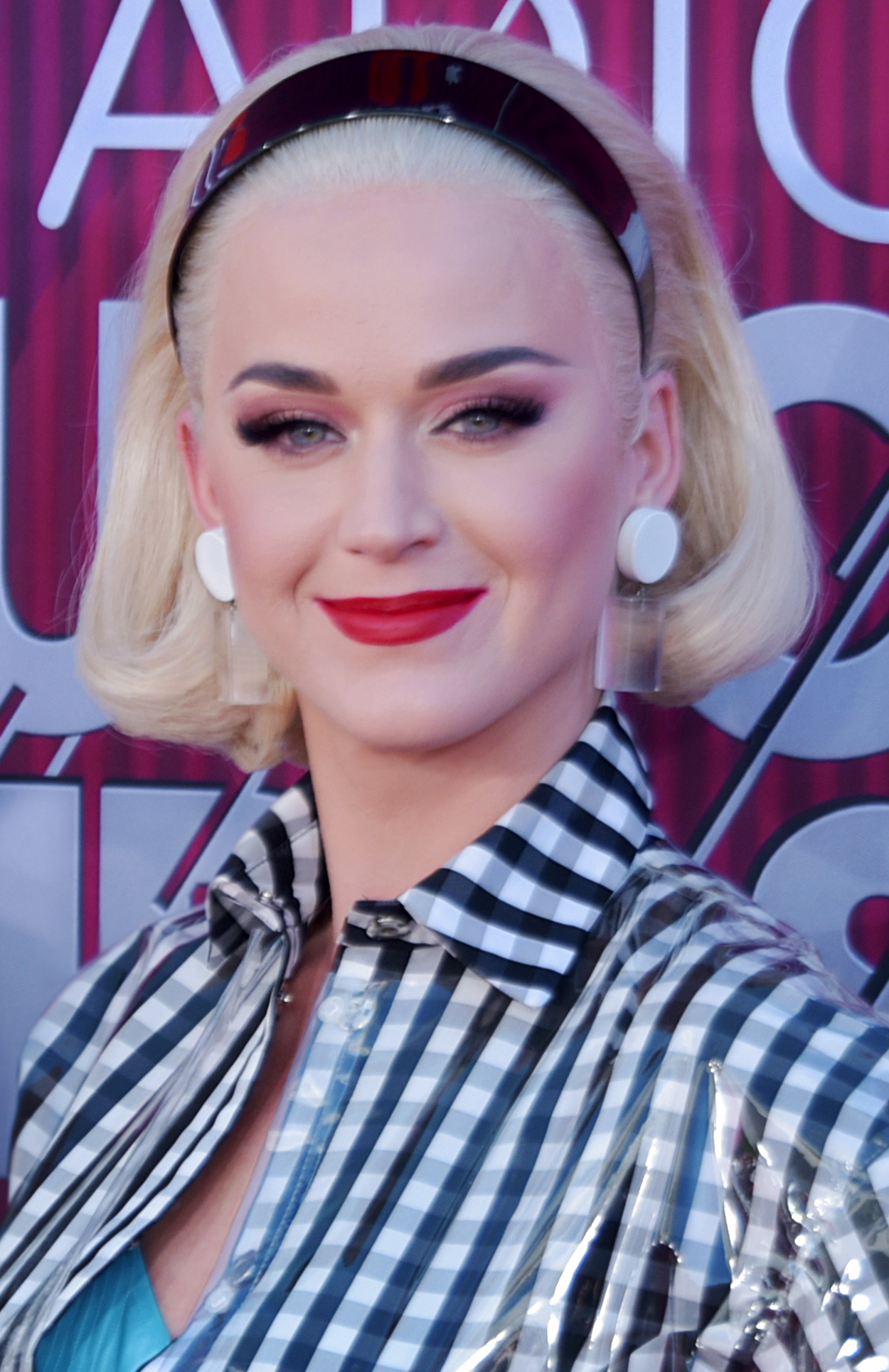
Katy Perry's festive track "Cozy Little Christmas" ended the year at number one.

Key
| † | Indicates best-performing AC song of 2018 |

| Issue date | Title | Artist(s) | Ref. |
|---|---|---|---|
| January 3 | "Santa's Coming for Us" | Sia | |
| January 6 | "There's Nothing Holdin' Me Back" | Shawn Mendes | |
| January 13 | "There's Nothing Holdin' Me Back" | Shawn Mendes | |
| January 20 | "There's Nothing Holdin' Me Back" | Shawn Mendes | |
| January 27 | "What About Us" | Pink | |
| February 3 | "What About Us" | Pink | |
| February 10 | "What About Us" | Pink | |
| February 17 | "What About Us" | Pink | |
| February 24 | "Perfect" † | Ed Sheeran | |
| March 3 | "Perfect" † | Ed Sheeran | |
| March 10 | "Perfect" † | Ed Sheeran | |
| March 17 | "Perfect" † | Ed Sheeran | |
| March 24 | "Perfect" † | Ed Sheeran | |
| March 31 | "Perfect" † | Ed Sheeran | |
| April 7 | "Perfect" † | Ed Sheeran | |
| April 14 | "Perfect" † | Ed Sheeran | |
| April 21 | "Perfect" † | Ed Sheeran | |
| April 28 | "Perfect" † | Ed Sheeran | |
| May 5 | "Perfect" † | Ed Sheeran | |
| May 12 | "Perfect" † | Ed Sheeran | |
| May 19 | "Perfect" † | Ed Sheeran | |
| May 26 | "Perfect" † | Ed Sheeran | |
| June 2 | "Perfect" † | Ed Sheeran | |
| June 9 | "Perfect" † | Ed Sheeran | |
| June 16 | "Perfect" † | Ed Sheeran | |
| June 23 | "Perfect" † | Ed Sheeran | |
| June 30 | "Perfect" † | Ed Sheeran | |
| July 7 | "Perfect" † | Ed Sheeran | |
| July 14 | "Perfect" † | Ed Sheeran | |
| July 21 | "Perfect" † | Ed Sheeran | |
| July 28 | "The Middle" | Zedd, Maren Morris and Grey | |
| August 4 | "The Middle" | Zedd, Maren Morris and Grey | |
| August 11 | "The Middle" | Zedd, Maren Morris and Grey | |
| August 18 | "The Middle" | Zedd, Maren Morris and Grey | |
| August 25 | "The Middle" | Zedd, Maren Morris and Grey | |
| September 1 | "The Middle" | Zedd, Maren Morris and Grey | |
| September 8 | "The Middle" | Zedd, Maren Morris and Grey | |
| September 15 | "Delicate" | Taylor Swift | |
| September 22 | "Delicate" | Taylor Swift | |
| September 29 | "Delicate" | Taylor Swift | |
| October 6 | "Delicate" | Taylor Swift | |
| October 13 | "Delicate" | Taylor Swift | |
| October 20 | "Delicate" | Taylor Swift | |
| October 27 | "Delicate" | Taylor Swift | |
| November 3 | "Delicate" | Taylor Swift | |
| November 10 | "Girls Like You" | Maroon 5 | |
| November 17 | "Girls Like You" | Maroon 5 | |
| November 24 | "Delicate" | Taylor Swift | |
| December 1 | "Delicate" | Taylor Swift | |
| December 8 | "Have Yourself a Merry Little Christmas" | John Legend featuring Esperanza Spalding | |
| December 15 | "Have Yourself a Merry Little Christmas" | John Legend featuring Esperanza Spalding | |
| December 22 | "Have Yourself a Merry Little Christmas" | John Legend featuring Esperanza Spalding | |
| December 29 | "Cozy Little Christmas" | Katy Perry | |

== See also ==
- 2018 in American music
