= Small Talk (song) =

2019 single by Katy Perry

Single by Katy Perry
- A-side: "Never Really Over" (double A-side)
- Released: August 9, 2019
- Studio: MXM Studios (Los Angeles, CA); Secret Garden Studios (Montecito, CA)
- Length: 2:42
- Label: Capitol
- Songwriters: Katy Perry; Johan Carlsson; Charlie Puth; Jacob Kasher Hindlin
- Producers: Carlsson; Puth

Katy Perry singles chronology
"Never Really Over" (2019)	"Small Talk" (2019)	"Harleys in Hawaii" (2019)

Music video
- "Small Talk" on YouTube

"Small Talk" is a song by the American singer-songwriter Katy Perry. It was released as a standalone single by Capitol Records on August 9, 2019. It was announced in a social media post on August 6, 2019. Perry co-wrote the song with Jacob Kasher Hindlin and its producers Charlie Puth and Johan Carlsson of Carolina Liar. "Small Talk" was included as a bonus track on the Japanese and fan editions of Perry's sixth studio album, Smile.

== Background ==
Charlie Puth talked about the song in an Instagram post in July 2019. On August 6, Perry posted several pictures to her social media accounts of lines from the song, with the first reading "Isn't it weird / That you've seen me naked / We had conversations about forever / Now it's about the weather okay". The song's music video was released on August 30, 2019.

On November 29, 2019, a Black Friday Record Store Day limited edition 12" orange vinyl was released, pairing the song with Perry's previous single "Never Really Over".

== Music video ==
Perry and her pet dog Nugget attend a dog show where they win the top prize. She sees another competitor (played by model Charley Santos) and immediately falls for him. Perry's attention is shifted to the man and she ignores her dog. Eventually he moves in with Perry and brings his dog. Perry, the man and their two dogs are seen all together at the end.

== Chart performance ==
"Small Talk" debuted and peaked at number 81 on the US Billboard Hot 100. In Canada, the song peaked at number 56, while reaching number 33 in Australia. On the UK Singles Chart, it peaked at number 43, while being more commercially successful in Scotland where it entered the top 20 and peaked at number 18.

== Live performances ==
On August 22, 2019, Perry uploaded the first live performance of the song in a bathroom on her official Instagram account. On September 18, 2019, she also performed the song at The Ellen DeGeneres Show.

== Track listing ==
Digital download and streaming

1. "Small Talk" — 2:42

Digital download and streaming (Lost Kings Remix)

1. "Small Talk" (Lost Kings Remix) — 2:52

Digital download and streaming (Sofi Tukker Remix)

1. "Small Talk" (Sofi Tukker Remix) — 3:12

Digital download and streaming (White Panda Remix)

1. "Small Talk" (White Panda Remix) — 3:12

12-inch vinyl

1. "Never Really Over" – 3:44
2. "Small Talk" – 2:41

== Credits and personnel ==
Credits adapted from Tidal.

- Katy Perry – vocals, songwriter
- Charlie Puth – producer, songwriter, programmer
- Johan Carlsson – producer, songwriter, programmer
- Jacob Kasher Hindlin – songwriter
- Peter Karlsson – vocal editor, vocal producer
- Bill Zimmerman – engineer
- Rachael Findlen – engineer
- Sam Holland – engineer
- Dave Kutch – mastering engineer
- Phil Tan – mixer
- Jeremy Lertola – assistant recording engineer

== Charts ==
=== Weekly charts ===
Chart performance
Chart (2019)	Peak position
Australia (ARIA)	33
Belgium (Ultratip Bubbling Under Flanders)	9
Belgium (Ultratip Bubbling Under Wallonia)	21
Canada Hot 100 (Billboard)	56
China Airplay/FL (Billboard)	13
Czech Republic Singles Digital (ČNS IFPI)	41
France (SNEP Sales Chart)	65
Ireland (IRMA)	36
Lithuania (AGATA)	20
Netherlands (Single Top 100)	86
Mexico (Billboard Mexican Airplay)	36
New Zealand Hot Singles (RMNZ)	1
Portugal (AFP)	93
Scottish Singles Sales (Official Charts)	18
Slovakia Airplay (ČNS IFPI)	64
Slovakia Singles Digital (ČNS IFPI)	33
Sweden (Sverigetopplistan)	62
Switzerland (Schweizer Hitparade)	91
UK Singles (Official Charts)	43
US Billboard Hot 100	81
US Adult Pop Airplay (Billboard)	36
US Pop Airplay (Billboard)	38
Venezuela Anglo (Record Report)	23

=== Year-end charts ===
Annual chart rankings
Chart (2019)	Rank
Tokyo (Tokio Hot 100)	35

== Certifications and sales ==
Region	Certification	Certified units/sales
Australia (ARIA)	Gold	35,000^{‡}
Brazil (Pro-Música Brasil)	Platinum	40,000^{‡}
Norway (IFPI Norway)	Gold	30,000^{‡}
United Kingdom	—	10,906 (Note: United Kingdom first-week sales figures.)
^{‡} Sales+streaming figures based on certification alone.

== Release history ==
Release dates and formats
Region	Date	Format(s)	Version	Label	Ref.
Various	August 9, 2019	Digital download; streaming	Original	Capitol	
Australia	August 9, 2019	Radio airplay	Original	Capitol	
United States	August 20, 2019	Contemporary hit radio	Original	Capitol	
United States	August 26, 2019	Adult contemporary radio; hot adult contemporary radio; modern adult contemporary radio	Original	Capitol	
Italy	September 13, 2019	Radio airplay	Original	Universal	
Various	October 11, 2019	Digital download; streaming	Lost Kings remix	Capitol	
Various	October 11, 2019	Digital download; streaming	Sofi Tukker remix	Capitol	
Various	October 11, 2019	Digital download; streaming	White Panda remix	Capitol	
Europe	November 29, 2019	12-inch vinyl	Original	Capitol	
United States	November 29, 2019	12-inch vinyl	Original	Capitol	
