= Dressin' Up =

2012 song by Katy Perry

Song by Katy Perry

from the album Teenage Dream: The Complete Confection
- Released: March 23, 2012
- Studio: The Boom Boom Room (Burbank, California)
- Genre: Dance-rock; electro
- Length: 3:43
- Label: Capitol
- Songwriters: Katy Perry; Christopher Stewart; Monte Neuble; Matt Theissen
- Producer: C. "Tricky" Stewart

Lyric video
- "Dressin' Up" on YouTube

"Dressin' Up" is a song by American singer Katy Perry from Teenage Dream: The Complete Confection (2012), the reissue of her third studio album, Teenage Dream (2010). It was written by Perry, Christopher "Tricky" Stewart, Monte Neuble, and Matt Thiessen, and produced by Stewart with vocals production from Kuk Harrell. The song was recorded in The Boom Boom Room, based in Burbank, California. Musically, "Dressin' Up" incorporates the styles of electro and dance-rock, along with a prominent electronic dance production.

Lyrically, the song speaks of dressing up in different outfits for a lover, and contains multiple innuendos. The song was released through Capitol Records on the 23rd of March, 2012, as the 16th track to the album. Upon the release of Teenage Dream: The Complete Confection, "Dressin' Up" garnered mixed reviews from critics, some of whom complimented its "fun" sound, while others denounced it as being too similar to Perry's other songs. The track charted at number 109 on the UK Singles Chart.

== Background ==
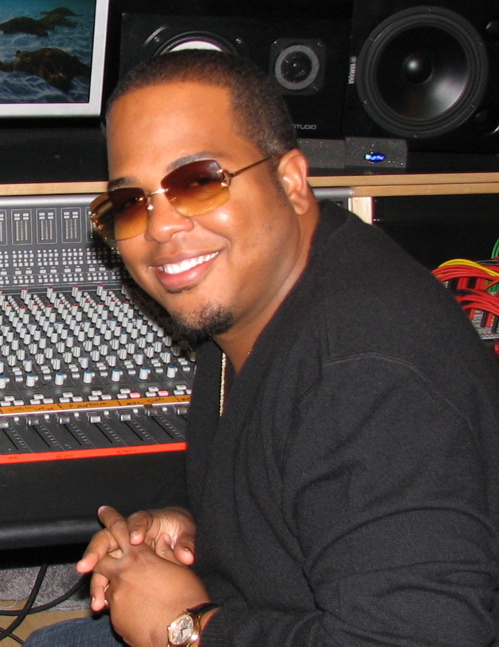
Perry worked with frequent collaborator Tricky Stewart on the song.

In October 2011, Tricky Stewart told MTV that he was back in the studio with Perry working on leftovers from their Teenage Dream sessions. He stated: "Katy and I went into [the studio] just to address some issues with [the] records that we had done in the past that didn't end up going on [the album], so we are in the process of just listening and freshening up things and getting ready for something special she has going on", hinting that Teenage Dream would have a re-release. Stewart also added: "We always knew that the records we created were special [and] at the time it was more contractual obligation [that they did not make the album], I can only have so many songs produced by me on the album, and she honestly didn't need any more records, as you can tell by the success of this album, the songs have been flawless." The producer later revealed one of the songs was titled "Dressing Up", saying: "This song is really special. It's called 'Dressing Up,' so it's going to be a big record, I think, it definitely fits. It's right there in what her sensibilities are as a musician and a songwriter. She doesn't change much. She has a very keen musical taste. It'll be really good".

== Recording ==
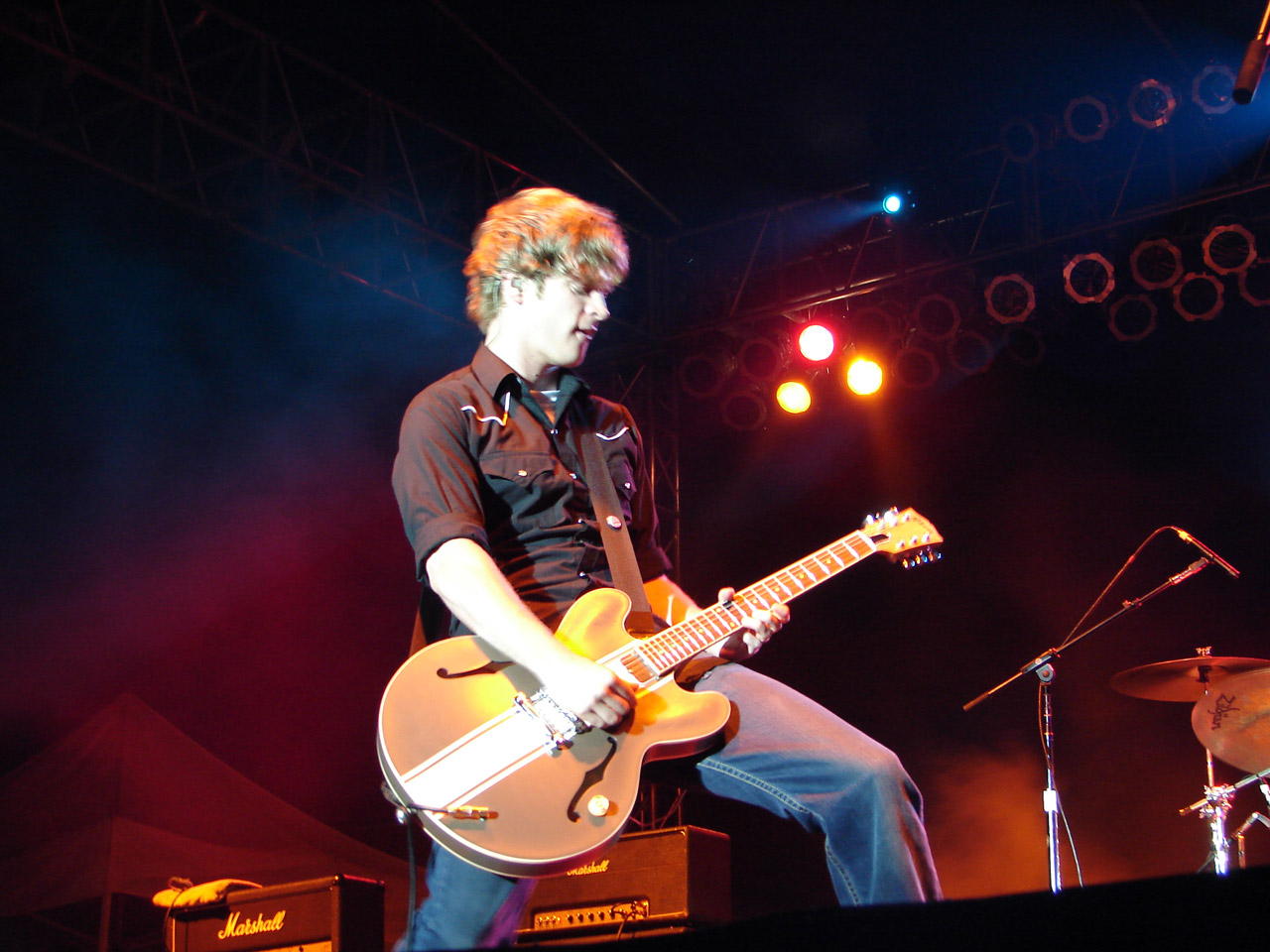
Matt Thiessen (pictured), of Relient K helped co-write "Dressin' Up".

"Dressin' Up" was written by Perry, along with Christopher "Tricky" Stewart, Monte Neuble, and Matt Theissen. Production of the song was handled by Stewart and Kuk Harrell, who provided the song's vocal production. It was recorded and engineered at Studio at the Palms in Las Vegas, Nevada, Triange Sound Studios and Silent Sound Studios in Atlanta, Georgia, The Boom Boom Room in Burbank, California, and at Triangle Sound Studios in Encino, California. It was engineered by Brian "B-LUV" Thomas, Andrew Wuepper, Chris "TEK" O'Ryan, and Pat Thrall, with assistance from Luis Navarro, Steven Dennis, Mark Gray, Kory Aaron, Charles Malone, Randy Urbanski, Justin Roberts, Steven Villa, and James Hunt. Vocoder and vocal effects were carried out by Thrall, who also played the rhythm guitar.

Drum programming and sequencing was done by Stewart along with Kenneth "Soundz" Colby, with additional programming coming from Mike Green. Stewart and Neuble played the keyboards, Malone, Julio Mirando, and Daniel Silvestri played the guitar, while Silvestri played the bass guitar. The guitars and bass were recorded and engineered by Nick Chahwala, while Serban Ghenea mixed the song at MixStar Studios in Virginia Beach, Virginia. "Dressin' Up" was engineered by John Hanes, and was assisted by Phil Seaford.

== Composition and reception ==
"Dressin' Up" has a length of three minutes and forty-four seconds. Musically, the song incorporates dance-rock and electro styles, and features an electronic dance production. Lyrically, the song is about dressing up for one's lover, and sees Perry "inviting some 'dirty doggie' to 'pet her kitty.'" State in the Real reviewer Chris Will deemed it similar to Perry's other songs, calling it "pretty typical in the scope of Katy Perry's sound." Melissa Maerz of Entertainment Weekly praised "Dressin' Up" as a "fun" song. Maritess Calabria of RyanSeacreast.com praised the song as "smooth and sultry". Becky Bain from Idolator felt the song contained some "absolutely ridiculous" verses. A lyric video for the song was released shortly after Teenage Dream: The Complete Confection. Jenna Hally Rubenstein from MTV praised the song's lyric video as "lyric video nirvana". Christopher Rosa of Glamour ranked it as Perry's 10th worst song, writing that its chorus was "chaotic".

== Credits and personnel ==
Credits adapted from the liner notes of Teenage Dream.

=== Recording locations ===
- Recorded at Studio at the Palms (Las Vegas), Triangle Sound Studios & Silent Sound Studios (Atlanta, Georgia), The Boom Boom Boom (Burbank, California), Triange Sound Studios (Encinal, California).
- Mixed at Mixtar Studios, Virginia Beach.

=== Personnel ===
- Katy Perry – songwriting, vocals
- Matt Thiessen – songwriting
- Tricky Stewart – songwriting, production, recording, programming
- Monte Neuble – songwriting
- Brian Thomas – recording
- Chris O'Ryan – recording
- Pat Thrall – recording, vocal recording
- Kuk Harrell – vocal recording, vocal production
- Kenneth Colby – programming

== Charts ==
Following the release of Teenage Dream: The Complete Confection, "Dressin' Up" debuted and peaked at number 109 on the issue date of April 7, 2012, on the UK Singles Chart.

Chart (2012)	Peak position
UK Singles (Official Charts Company)	109
