= Cozy Little Christmas =

2018 single by Katy Perry

Single by Katy Perry
- Released: November 15, 2018
- Genre: Christmas
- Length: 3:02
- Label: Capitol
- Songwriters: Katy Perry; Greg Wells; Ferras Alqaisi
- Producers: Perry; Wells; Alqaisi

Katy Perry singles chronology
"Hey Hey Hey" (2018)	"Cozy Little Christmas" (2018)	"365" (2019)

Music video
- "Cozy Little Christmas" on YouTube

"Cozy Little Christmas" is a Christmas song by the American singer-songwriter Katy Perry. It was released exclusively on Amazon Music on November 15, 2018, and later distributed to all platforms on November 1, 2019. She wrote and produced the song with Greg Wells and Ferras Alqaisi.

"Cozy Little Christmas" was written about Perry's time spent with her family in Copenhagen for Christmas. The track's lyrics discuss prioritizing love and affection over gifts. It charted at number 10 in Croatia, number 22 in the United Kingdom and Belgium, number 32 in Germany, number 36 in Austria, number 49 in Switzerland, and number 53 in the United States. The song also reached number one on the US Billboard Adult Contemporary chart. A music video was released on December 2, 2019.

== Music and composition ==
Katy Perry announced the song on Twitter, posting a four-second audio clip of it on November 14, 2018, with the caption that she was "Bout to sleigh in an hour". It is her second Christmas song after "Every Day Is a Holiday", which was released in 2015. Perry co-wrote and co-produced "Cozy Little Christmas" with Greg Wells and Ferras Alqaisi. She called it "one of my favorite songs I've written".

Perry wrote the song about spending Christmas in Copenhagen with her family. "Cozy Little Christmas" runs for 3 minutes and 2 seconds. It is a "whimsical" Christmas song featuring jingle bells and lyrics about not needing gifts at Christmas time because love is more important. Perry sings "I don't need diamonds or sparkly things" and "you can't buy this feeling" along with "Nothing lights my fire or wraps me up baby like you do" in the chorus.

== Release ==
"Cozy Little Christmas" was first released exclusively on Amazon Music on November 15, 2018. It became available on all platforms on November 1, 2019, and had a red vinyl distribution on October 22, 2021 containing the original song along with an instrumental version. A green vinyl release will follow on December 4, 2024.

== Music video ==
The song's music video was released on December 2, 2019. It opens with Perry decorating a Christmas tree in a festive living room before Santa Claus and animated characters from Rudolph the Red-Nosed Reindeer appear. Perry and Santa, who is dressed in a striped bathing suit and Hawaiian shirt, then have a pampered Christmas, relaxing at a poolside and getting massages while the animated characters wait on them. Perry later appears dressed as a candy cane in a giant martini glass full of eggnog. While drunk on eggnog, she talks to the animated characters in a kitchen, and the video ends with all the characters dancing in the festive living room intercut with martini glass and kitchen scenes.

== Critical reception ==
Marina Pedrosa from Billboard said that "Perry's vocals are velvety as ever as she sings the festive lyrics, 'Just you and me / Under the tree / A cozy little Christmas here with you.'" Zac Gelfand of Consequence wrote that "Cozy Little Christmas" is an "appropriate step back and a deep breath" for Perry and "a simple, bubbly, holiday love song, serving as a respite after an otherwise tough several months." Writing for MTV News, Madeline Roth praised the "bubbly bop" as "mighty cozy", adding that "this festive little tune will be a crowd-pleaser all around". The song was ranked at number 79 on Billboard's Greatest of All Time Holiday 100 Songs.

== Chart performance ==
In the United States, "Cozy Little Christmas" entered the Billboard Adult Contemporary chart at number 10, becoming Perry's ninth track to reach its top 10 and first to do so since "Dark Horse" in 2014. It has since reached number one on that chart as well as number 53 on the Billboard Hot 100 and number 30 on its Holiday 100 chart. On January 27, 2022, the song received a Platinum certification from the Recording Industry Association of America (RIAA) for 1,000,000 units.

Within Europe, the song debuted at number 85 on the UK Singles Chart in December 2018, and rose to number 22 in the nation the following year. "Cozy Little Christmas" has also been certified Gold by the British Phonographic Industry (BPI) for shipments of 400,000 units. It has reached the same peak in Belgium while charting at numbers 10 in Croatia, 32 in Germany, 37 in Austria, and 49 in Switzerland.

== Live performances and use in media ==
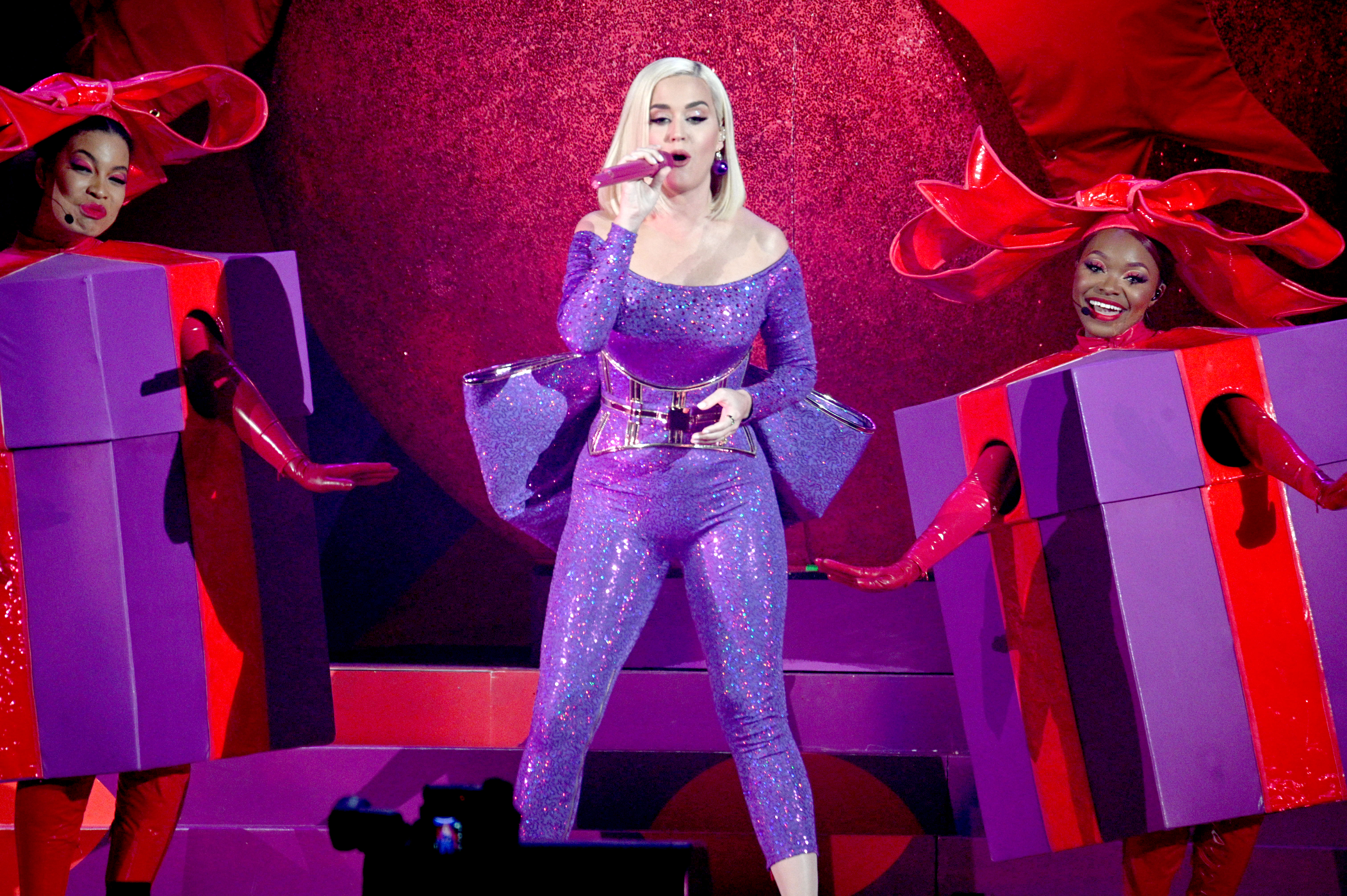
Perry performing the song during the 2019 iHeartRadio Jingle Ball Tour in Chicago

Perry performed the song for the first time on December 6, 2019, as part of her set list for the 2019 iHeartRadio Jingle Ball Tour. The performance of the song on December 6, 2019, was broadcast during The CW special on December 19, 2019. On November 30, 2020, she performed the song along with "I'll Be Home for Christmas" at The Disney Holiday Singalong. On December 8, 2024, Perry sang it at the 2024 Jingle Bell Ball.

The song was used in the 2020 Christmas-themed television film The Christmas House and 2021 Netflix Christmas romantic comedy film The Princess Switch 3: Romancing the Star.

== Credits and personnel ==
Credits adapted from Tidal and Rolling Stone India.

- Katy Perry – lead vocals, production, background vocals, songwriting
- Ferras Alqaisi – background vocals, production, songwriting
- Greg Wells – production, songwriting, mixing, bass guitar, celesta, drums, harp, piano
- Al Schmitt – record engineering
- Ian MacGregor – record engineering
- Brian Lucey – mastering engineering

== Charts ==
=== Weekly charts ===
Weekly chart performance for "Cozy Little Christmas"
Chart (2018–2026)	Peak position
Australia (ARIA)	146
Austria (Ö3 Austria Top 40)	36
Belarus Airplay (TopHit)	192
Belgium (Ultratop 50 Flanders)	22
Canada AC (Billboard)	1
Croatia International Airplay (Top lista)	10
Estonia Airplay (TopHit)	39
Germany (GfK)	32
Global 200 (Billboard)	60
Hungary (Editors' Choice Top 40)	37
Hungary (Stream Top 40)	36
Italy (FIMI)	61
Moldova Airplay (TopHit)	31
Romania Airplay (TopHit)	83
Switzerland (Schweizer Hitparade)	49
UK Singles (Official Charts)	22
Ukraine Airplay (TopHit)	84
US Billboard Hot 100	53
US Adult Contemporary (Billboard)	1
US Adult Pop Airplay (Billboard)	37
US Holiday 100 (Billboard)	30
US Rolling Stone Top 100	26

=== Monthly charts ===
Monthly chart performance
Chart (2023)	Peak position
Moldova Airplay (TopHit)	75

=== Year-end charts ===
Year-end chart performance for "Cozy Little Christmas"
Chart (2019)	Position
US Adult Contemporary (Billboard)	43

== Certifications ==
Region	Certification	Certified units/sales
Australia (ARIA)	Gold	35,000^{‡}
Austria (IFPI Austria)	Platinum	30,000^{‡}
Germany (BVMI)	Gold	300,000^{‡}
United Kingdom (BPI)	Gold	400,000^{‡}
United States (RIAA)	Platinum	1,000,000^{‡}
^{‡} Sales+streaming figures based on certification alone.

== Release history ==
Release dates and formats for "Cozy Little Christmas"
Region	Date	Format(s)	Version(s)	Label	Ref.
Various	November 15, 2018	Digital download; streaming; (Amazon exclusive)	Original	Capitol	
Italy	November 30, 2018	Radio airplay	Original	Universal	
Various	November 1, 2019	Digital download; streaming	Original	Capitol	
Various	October 22, 2021	7-inch vinyl (Red)	Original; instrumental	Capitol	
Various	December 4, 2024	7-inch vinyl (Green)	Original; instrumental	Capitol	

== See also ==
- List of Billboard Adult Contemporary number ones of 2018
