= 365 (Zedd and Katy Perry song) =

2019 single by Zedd and Katy Perry

Single by Zedd and Katy Perry
- Released: 14 February 2019
- Studio: Studios 301 (Sydney, Australia)
- Genre: Pop-house; dance-pop; electropop
- Length: 3:02
- Label: Interscope
- Songwriters: Anton Zaslavski; Katy Perry; Daniel Davidsen; Corey Sanders; Peter Wallevik; Caroline Ailin; Mich Hansen
- Producers: Zedd; Cutfather; PhD

Zedd singles chronology
"Lost in Japan" (remix) (2018)	"365" (2019)	"Good Thing" (2019)

Katy Perry singles chronology
"Cozy Little Christmas" (2018)	"365" (2019)	"Con Calma" (remix) (2019)

Music video
- "365" on YouTube

"365" is a song by German music producer Zedd and the American singer-songwriter Katy Perry. It was released on 14 February 2019 along with its music video, directed by Warren Fu. The song reached number one in Bulgaria and Israel as well as the top 10 in Lebanon, Lithuania, Mexico, and Serbia, the top 20 in Argentina, Estonia, Hungary, Latvia, and the top 30 in the Czech Republic, the Netherlands, Singapore, and Slovenia.

== Background ==
"365" was first registered with Universal Music Publishing Group in February 2019. The song then appeared registered on Shazam before being removed and re-added again. On 13 February, Zedd and Perry began sending emojis to each other on Twitter before Zedd shared the trailer for the video.

== Critical reception ==
Brittany Spanos from Rolling Stone complimented the track and described it as a "breezy, hypnotic love song". Winston Cook-Wilson, in his review for Spin, wrote that "365" was "a featherweight piece of pop-house that luckily does not sound like every other Zedd song the producer has released in recent memory".

Michael Love of Paper praised "365", calling it "a pretty solid pop tune from Zedd and Perry, which of course, is what also helps you stay till the end."

== Chart performance ==
In the US, "365" debuted and peaked at number 86 on the Billboard Hot 100, spending a single week on the chart. Additionally, the song reached number one in Israel and Bulgaria, as well as the top ten in Lebanon, Netherlands, Argentina (Anglo Airplay), United States (Hot Dance/Electronic Songs), Australia (Dance), Mexico (Airplay), Netherlands and Lithuania. It also reached the top 20 in Estonia, Hungary, US Dance Club Songs and Greece, and top 40 in Australia, the United Kingdom, Scotland, Romania, Slovakia, Slovenia and Ireland.

== Music video ==
The music video, directed by Warren Fu, was released alongside the song on 14 February. It depicts Perry as a robot and Zedd as a human test subject, where an experiment is conducted to test the two living together. The robot starts falling in love with him, but he does not love her back and distances himself from her. She begins to malfunction because of her heartbreak and is deprogrammed.

=== Reception ===
Michael Love Michael of Paper acclaimed the themes and cinematography of the music video. He commented: "Definitely worth crying over if that's what society comes to." Corinne Heller from E! wrote that in the video, "Katy Perry plays a creepily obsessive android." Sam Moore of NME described the video as "sci-fi-indebted". Winston Cook-Wilson of Spin stated that "Mostly, one just wonders if the money could have been spent better."

== Track listing ==
- Digital download and streaming
1. "365"
- Digital download and streaming (Remixes)
1. "365" (Zedd remix)
2. "365" (Jonas Aden remix)
3. "365" (Ellis remix)
4. "365" (Kuuro remix)

== Credits and personnel ==
Credits adapted from Tidal.

- Zedd – songwriter, producer, mixer, studio personnel
- Katy Perry – vocals, songwriter
- Daniel Davidsen – songwriter
- Corey Sanders – songwriter
- Peter Wallevik – songwriter
- Caroline Ailin – songwriter
- Mich Hansen – songwriter
- Cutfather – producer
- PhD – producer
- Mike Marsh – mastering engineer, studio personnel
- Ryan Shanahan – engineer, studio personnel

== Charts ==
=== Weekly charts ===
Chart (2019)	Peak position
Argentina Anglo (Monitor Latino)	11
Australia (ARIA)	38
Australia Dance (ARIA)	5
Austria (Ö3 Austria Top 40)	70
Belgium (Ultratip Bubbling Under Flanders)	1
Belgium (Ultratip Bubbling Under Wallonia)	10
Bulgaria (PROPHON)	1
Canada Hot 100 (Billboard)	52
China Airplay/FL (Billboard)	21
CIS Airplay (TopHit)	73
Colombia (National-Report)	62
Czech Republic Airplay (ČNS IFPI)	44
Czech Republic Singles Digital (ČNS IFPI)	26
Estonia (Eesti Tipp-40)	17
France (SNEP)	129
Germany (GfK)	72
Greece International Digital Singles (IFPI)	11
Hungary (Rádiós Top 40)	17
Hungary (Stream Top 40)	21
Ireland (IRMA)	33
Israel (Media Forest)	1
Italy (FIMI)	68
Italian Airplay (EarOne)	11
Japan Hot 100 (Billboard)	52
Latvia (LAIPA)	13
Lebanon (OLT20 Combined Chart)	7
Lithuania (AGATA)	9
Mexico (Billboard Mexican Airplay)	6
Netherlands (Dutch Top 40)	24
Netherlands (Single Top 100)	74
New Zealand Hot Singles (RMNZ)	3
Poland Airplay (ZPAV)	38
Portugal (AFP)	63
Romania (Airplay 100)	40
Russia Airplay (TopHit)	68
Scottish Singles Sales (Official Charts)	40
Singapore (RIAS)	23
Slovakia Airplay (ČNS IFPI)	31
Slovakia Singles Digital (ČNS IFPI)	28
Slovenia (SloTop50)	22
Spain (Promusicae)	85
Sweden (Sverigetopplistan)	60
Switzerland (Schweizer Hitparade)	59
UK Singles (Official Charts)	37
US Billboard Hot 100	86
US Adult Pop Airplay (Billboard)	29
US Dance Club Songs (Billboard)	15
US Hot Dance/Electronic Songs (Billboard)	7
US Pop Airplay (Billboard)	22
Venezuela (National Report)	81

=== Year-end charts ===
2019 year-end chart performance for "365"
Chart (2019)	Position
Hungary (Rádiós Top 40)	72
Tokyo (Tokio Hot 100)	55
US Hot Dance/Electronic Songs (Billboard)	18

2021 year-end chart performance for "365"
Chart (2021)	Position
Hungary (Rádiós Top 40)	95

== Certifications and sales ==
Region	Certification	Certified units/sales
Australia (ARIA)	Platinum	70,000^{‡}
Brazil (Pro-Música Brasil)	2× Platinum	80,000^{‡}
Canada (Music Canada)	Platinum	80,000^{‡}
Finland	Gold	2,000
New Zealand (RMNZ)	Gold	15,000^{‡}
Norway (IFPI Norway)	Gold	30,000^{‡}
Poland (ZPAV)	Gold	25,000^{‡}
United Kingdom (BPI)	Silver	200,000^{‡}
United States	—	10,000 (Note: United Kingdom first-week sales figures.)
^{‡} Sales+streaming figures based on certification alone.

== Release history ==
Release dates and formats for "365"
Region	Date	Format(s)	Version	Label	Ref.
Various	14 February 2019	Digital download; streaming	Original	Interscope	
Italy	15 February 2019	Radio airplay	Original	Universal	
United States	19 February 2019	Contemporary hit radio	Original	Interscope	
Various	22 March 2019	Digital download; streaming	Remixes	Interscope	
