= Katy Perry discography =

- Perry performing in 2026
- Studio albums: 7
- Extended plays: 7
- Singles: 43
- Promotional singles: 13
- Reissue albums: 1
- Compilation albums: 1
- Box sets: 1

The American singer Katy Perry has released seven studio albums, one reissue, seven extended plays (EP), one compilation album, 43 singles (including four as featured artist), and 13 promotional singles. According to the Recording Industry Association of America (RIAA), Perry is the fourteenth top digital singles artist in the United States, with 121.5 million digital singles and 19 million album units. As of July 2024, she has a total of seven RIAA Diamond-certified records. Billboard listed Perry as the fifth top female artist of the 21st century (15th overall) and the 61st greatest artist of all time. She has scored three number-one albums on US Billboard 200 and nine number-one songs on Billboard Hot 100. With over 151 million pure sales worldwide, Perry is one of the best-selling music artists of all time. Her discography has garnered more than 125 billion cumulative streams from various digital and streaming platforms as of November 2025.

At age 16, Perry released a self-titled gospel album in March 2001 under her real name Katy Hudson, which failed to chart in any music market. After signing with Capitol Records in April 2007, she released her second album, One of the Boys, in June 2008. Its singles "I Kissed a Girl" and "Hot n Cold" both topped charts in Austria, Canada, Germany, and Switzerland. The album peaked within the top 10 in the US, Austria, Canada, France, Germany, and Switzerland, and sold more than seven million copies worldwide. Throughout 2009 and 2010, Perry was featured on two singles. The first was on Colorado-based band 3OH!3's song "Starstrukk", and the second was a collaboration with Timbaland on "If We Ever Meet Again", from his album Shock Value II. Both singles reached the top 10 in Australia, Ireland, and the United Kingdom, while the latter topped the charts in New Zealand. Perry also performed for MTV Unplugged and a live album of the performance was released in November 2009.

Perry's third studio album Teenage Dream was released in August 2010 and topped the charts in the US, Australia, Austria, Canada, New Zealand, and the UK. It sold more than 12 million copies worldwide, becoming Perry's highest-selling album to date. When its singles "California Gurls", "Teenage Dream", "Firework", "E.T.", and "Last Friday Night (T.G.I.F.)" topped the Hot 100, she became the first woman and only the second artist after Michael Jackson to attain five number-one singles in the US from one album. The album was re-released in March 2012 as Teenage Dream: The Complete Confection. Both of its singles, "Part of Me" and "Wide Awake", charted at number one in Canada and New Zealand. Her fourth studio album Prism was released in October 2013 and reached number one in Australia, Canada, New Zealand, the UK, and the US. It sold more than eight million copies worldwide. The album's lead single, "Roar", topped the charts in the US, Australia, Austria, Canada, New Zealand, and the UK. The song has become the fourth most-certified single of all time in Australia (tied with "Blinding Lights" and "Uptown Funk") and Perry's most-certified single in the US and the UK. "Dark Horse", the third single from Prism, peaked at number one in the US and Canada and became the second best-selling single worldwide in 2014, according to the International Federation of the Phonographic Industry (IFPI). She subsequently released an anthem for the 2016 Summer Olympics titled "Rise", which debuted at number one in Australia.

Perry's fifth album Witness followed in June 2017. It topped the charts in the US and Canada. That year, she was also featured on Calvin Harris's song "Feels" from his album Funk Wav Bounces Vol. 1 along with Big Sean and Pharrell Williams, which reached number one in the UK. In 2018, she released the Christmas single "Cozy Little Christmas". This was followed by the release of the collaborations "365" (with Zedd) and "Con Calma" (remix, with Daddy Yankee and Snow). Perry released the non-album singles "Never Really Over", "Small Talk" and "Harleys in Hawaii" in 2019. Smile and 143 respectively followed as her sixth and seventh albums in August 2020 and September 2024. Both reached the top 10 of the album charts in the US, Australia, Austria, Italy, New Zealand, and the UK. In May 2026, Perry released a compilation album titled The Ones That Got the Plays, which became her fifth top-five album in New Zealand.

== Albums ==
=== Studio albums ===
List of albums, with selected chart positions, sales figures and certifications
Title	Album details	Peak chart positions										Sales	Certifications
Title	Album details	US	AUS	AUT	CAN	FRA	GER	ITA	NZ	SWI	UK	Sales	Certifications
Katy Hudson	Released: March 6, 2001; Label: Red Hill; Formats: Cassette, CD	—	—	—	—	—	—	—	—	—	—		
One of the Boys	Released: June 17, 2008; Label: Capitol; Formats: CD, digital download, LP, streaming	9	11	6	6	10	7	23	17	6	11	US: 1,730,000 (Note: United States sales figures for One of the Boys as of August 2020.); FRA: 156,800 (Note: France sales figures for One of the Boys as of December 2013.); UK: 758,410 (Note: United Kingdom sales figures for One of the Boys as of May 2026.)	RIAA: 3× Platinum; ARIA: 3× Platinum; BPI: 2× Platinum; BVMI: 3× Gold; FIMI: Platinum; IFPI AUT: Platinum; IFPI SWI: Platinum; MC: 5× Platinum; RMNZ: 2× Platinum; SNEP: 2× Platinum
Teenage Dream	Released: August 24, 2010; Label: Capitol; Formats: CD, digital download, LP, streaming	1	1	1	1	3	5	3	1	4	1	US: 3,100,000 (Note: United States sales figures for Teenage Dream as of August 2020.); CAN: 376,000 (Note: Canada sales figures for Teenage Dream as of January 2020.); FRA: 266,200 (Note: France sales figures for Teenage Dream as of December 2013.); GER: 200,000 (Note: Germany sales figures for Teenage Dream as of March 2012.); UK: 2,113,617 (Note: United Kingdom sales figures for Teenage Dream as of July 2026.)	RIAA: Diamond; ARIA: 7× Platinum; BPI: 7× Platinum; BVMI: 2× Platinum; FIMI: 3× Platinum; IFPI AUT: Platinum; IFPI SWI: 2× Platinum; MC: Diamond; RMNZ: 11× Platinum; SNEP: 3× Platinum
Prism	Released: October 18, 2013; Label: Capitol; Formats: CD, digital download, LP, streaming	1	1	3	1	4	4	5	1	2	1	US: 1,740,000 (Note: United States sales figures for Prism as of August 2020.); AUS: 179,000 (Note: Australia sales figures for Prism as of January 2014.); FRA: 260,000 (Note: France sales figures for Prism as of April 2017.); SWI: 10,000 (Note: Switzerland sales figures for Prism as of March 2015.); UK: 574,224 (Note: United Kingdom sales figures for Prism as of May 2026.)	RIAA: 5× Platinum; ARIA: 6× Platinum; BPI: Platinum; BVMI: Platinum; FIMI: Platinum; IFPI AUT: 3× Platinum; IFPI SWI: Platinum; MC: 8× Platinum; RMNZ: 6× Platinum; SNEP: 2× Platinum
Witness	Released: June 9, 2017; Label: Capitol; Formats: CD, digital download, LP, streaming	1	2	6	1	4	10	6	2	7	6	US: 311,000 (Note: United States sales figures for Witness as of August 2020.); AUS: 7,863 (Note: Australia sales figures for Witness, including its first week (5,794) and second week (2,069).); CAN: 23,000 (Note: Canada first-week sales figures for Witness.); FRA: 30,000 (Note: France sales figures for Witness as of March 2018.); UK: 106,206 (Note: United Kingdom sales figures for Witness as of May 2026.)	RIAA: Gold; ARIA: Gold; BPI: Gold; FIMI: Gold; IFPI AUT: Gold; MC: 2× Platinum; RMNZ: Gold; SNEP: Platinum
Smile	Released: August 28, 2020; Label: Capitol; Formats: Cassette, CD, digital download, LP, streaming	5	2	8	5	17	14	10	4	8	5	US: 67,000 (Note: United States sales figures for Smile as of March 2021.); FRA: 3,389 (Note: France sales figures for Smile, including its first week (2,800) and second week (589).)	RIAA: Gold; MC: Platinum; RMNZ: Gold
143	Released: September 20, 2024; Label: Capitol; Formats: Cassette, CD, digital download, LP, streaming	6	2	8	42	14	16	6	9	12	6	US: 100,000 (Note: United States sales figures for 143 as of December 2024.); FRA: 3,475 (Note: France sales figures for 143, including its first week (2,800) and second week (675).)	
"—" denotes items which did not chart in that country.

=== Reissues ===
List of reissues, with selected chart positions, sales figures and certifications
Title	Album details	Peak chart positions										Certifications
Title	Album details	US	AUS	BEL (FL)	BEL (WA)	FIN	FRA	NLD	NZ	SWE	UK	Certifications
Teenage Dream: The Complete Confection	Released: March 23, 2012; Label: Capitol; Formats: CD, digital download, LP, streaming	7	5	14	39	18	14	44	2	24	6	ARIA: 7× Platinum; GLF: Platinum; RMNZ: 4× Platinum

=== Compilation albums ===
List of compilation albums with selected details
Title	Compilation album details	Peak chart positions					Certifications
Title	Compilation album details	US	CAN	IRE	NZ	UK	Certifications
The Ones That Got the Plays	Released: May 13, 2026; Label: Capitol; Format: Digital download, streaming	117	60	8	5	8	BPI: Gold; RMNZ: Gold

== Extended plays ==
List of extended plays, with selected chart positions and sales figures
Title	Details	Peak chart positions				Sales
Title	Details	US	AUS DVD	FRA	SWI	Sales
Ur So Gay	Released: November 20, 2007; Label: Capitol; Formats: CD, digital download, streaming	—	—	—	—	US: 1,600 (Note: United States sales figures for Ur So Gay as of February 2008.)
The Hello Katy Australian Tour EP	Released: August 7, 2009; Label: Capitol; Formats: Digital download, streaming	—	—	—	—	
MTV Unplugged	Released: November 17, 2009; Label: Capitol; Formats: CD+DVD, digital download, LP, streaming	168	13	192	82	US: 63,000 (Note: United States sales figures for MTV Unplugged as of August 2020.); FRA: 273 (Note: France sales figures for MTV Unplugged.)
Camp Katy	Released: October 15, 2020; Label: UMG Recordings; Formats: Digital download, streaming	—	—	—	—	
Scorpio SZN	Released: October 26, 2020; Label: UMG Recordings; Formats: Digital download, streaming	—	—	—	—	
Empowered	Released: November 3, 2020; Label: UMG Recordings; Formats: Digital download, streaming	—	—	—	—	
Cosmic Energy	Released: December 18, 2020; Label: UMG Recordings; Formats: Digital download, streaming	—	—	—	—	
Thinking of the One That Got Away	Released: April 22, 2026; Label: UMG Recordings; Formats: Digital download, streaming	—	—	—	—	
"—" denotes items which did not chart in that country.

== Box sets ==
List of box sets, with selected chart positions
Title	Album details	Peak chart positions						
Title	Album details	US Sales	US Vinyl	BEL (FL)	NLD	SCO	UK Sales	UK Vinyl
Katy Perry CATalog Collector's Edition Boxset	Released: October 20, 2023; Label: Capitol; Format: 3×LP	19	10	72	77	88	75	26

== Singles ==
=== As lead artist ===
==== 2000s ====
List of singles as lead artist released in the 2000s, showing year released, selected chart positions, sales, certifications, and originating album
Title	Year	Peak chart positions										Sales	Certifications	Album
Title	Year	US	AUS	AUT	CAN	FRA	GER	ITA	NZ	SWI	UK	Sales	Certifications	Album
"I Kissed a Girl"	2008	1	1	1	1	5	1	1	1	1	1	US: 4,800,000 (Note: United States sales figures for "I Kissed a Girl" as of August 2020.); CAN: 211,000 (Note: Canada sales figures for "I Kissed a Girl" as of January 2010.); FRA: 275,900 (Note: France sales figures for "I Kissed a Girl" as of December 2014.); ITA: 25,000 (Note: Italy sales figures for "I Kissed a Girl" as of December 2008.); UK: 1,600,000 (Note: United Kingdom sales figures for "I Kissed a Girl" as of June 2024.)	RIAA: 6× Platinum; ARIA: 9× Platinum; BPI: 3× Platinum; BVMI: 5× Gold; FIMI: Platinum; IFPI AUT: Platinum; IFPI SWI: Platinum; MC: 7× Platinum; RMNZ: 4× Platinum; SNEP: Diamond	One of the Boys
"Hot n Cold"	2008	3	4	1	1	10	1	2	5	1	4	US: 5,800,000 (Note: United States sales figures for "Hot n Cold" as of August 2020.); CAN: 245,000 (Note: Canada sales figures for "Hot n Cold" as of January 2010.); FRA: 142,500 (Note: France sales figures for "Hot n Cold" as of December 2014.); UK: 1,500,000 (Note: United Kingdom sales figures for "Hot n Cold" as of June 2024.)	RIAA: 8× Platinum; ARIA: 10× Platinum; BPI: 3× Platinum; BVMI: 3× Gold; FIMI: Platinum; IFPI AUT: Platinum; IFPI SWI: Platinum; MC: Diamond; RMNZ: 4× Platinum; SNEP: Diamond	One of the Boys
"Thinking of You"	2009	29	34	18	24	11	19	14	—	45	27	US: 1,100,000 (Note: United States sales figures for "Thinking of You" as of February 2017.); FRA: 32,954 (Note: France sales figures for "Thinking of You" as of December 2009.)	RIAA: Platinum; ARIA: Platinum; BPI: Silver; MC: Platinum; RMNZ: Gold	One of the Boys
"Waking Up in Vegas"	2009	9	11	26	2	—	33	—	9	69	19	US: 2,300,000 (Note: United States sales figures for "Waking Up in Vegas" as of February 2017.); FRA: 2,300 (Note: France sales figures for "Waking Up in Vegas".)	RIAA: 2× Platinum; ARIA: 2× Platinum; BPI: Silver; MC: 2× Platinum; RMNZ: Gold	One of the Boys
"—" denotes a recording that did not chart in that territory.

==== 2010s ====
List of singles as lead artist released in the 2010s, showing year released, selected chart positions, sales, certifications, and originating album
Title	Year	Peak chart positions										Sales	Certifications	Album
Title	Year	US	AUS	AUT	CAN	FRA	GER	ITA	NZ	SWI	UK	Sales	Certifications	Album
"California Gurls" (featuring Snoop Dogg)	2010	1	1	3	1	5	3	3	1	4	1	US: 5,900,000 (Note: United States sales figures for "California Gurls" as of August 2020.); AUS: 200,000 (Note: Australia sales figures for "California Gurls" as of November 2010.); FRA: 140,000 (Note: France sales figures for "California Gurls" as of June 2017.); UK: 1,600,000 (Note: United Kingdom sales figures for "California Gurls" as of June 2024.)	RIAA: Diamond; ARIA: 11× Platinum; BPI: 3× Platinum; BVMI: Platinum; FIMI: Platinum; IFPI AUT: 2× Platinum; IFPI SWI: Platinum; MC: Diamond; RMNZ: 5× Platinum; SNEP: Platinum	Teenage Dream
"Teenage Dream"	2010	1	2	2	2	75	6	9	1	8	2	US: 5,000,000 (Note: United States sales figures for "Teenage Dream" as of August 2020.); AUS: 140,000 (Note: Australia sales figures for "Teenage Dream" as of November 2010.); FRA: 70,000 (Note: France sales figures for "Teenage Dream" as of June 2017.); UK: 1,400,000 (Note: United Kingdom sales figures for "Teenage Dream" as of June 2024.)	RIAA: Diamond; ARIA: 11× Platinum; BPI: 3× Platinum; BVMI: Gold; FIMI: Gold; IFPI AUT: Platinum; MC: Diamond; RMNZ: 4× Platinum; SNEP: Platinum	Teenage Dream
"Firework"	2010	1	3	3	1	7	4	4	1	3	3	US: 7,400,000 (Note: United States sales figures for "Firework" as of August 2020.); FRA: 140,000 (Note: France sales figures for "Firework" as of June 2017.); UK: 2,200,000 (Note: United Kingdom sales figures for "Firework" as of June 2024.)	RIAA: 12× Platinum (Diamond); ARIA: 16× Platinum; BPI: 4× Platinum; BVMI: Platinum; FIMI: 2× Platinum; IFPI AUT: 2× Platinum; IFPI SWI: Gold; MC: Diamond; RMNZ: 5× Platinum; SNEP: Diamond	Teenage Dream
"E.T." (solo or featuring Kanye West)	2011	1	5	7	1	10	9	9	1	14	3	US: 6,000,000 (Note: United States sales figures for "E.T." as of August 2020.); FRA: 65,000 (Note: France sales figures for "E.T." as of June 2017.)	RIAA: Diamond; ARIA: 6× Platinum; BPI: 2× Platinum; BVMI: Gold; FIMI: Platinum; IFPI AUT: Platinum; MC: 7× Platinum; RMNZ: 3× Platinum; SNEP: Platinum	Teenage Dream
"Last Friday Night (T.G.I.F.)"	2011	1	5	7	1	22	15	9	4	20	9	US: 3,800,000 (Note: United States sales figures for "Last Friday Night (T.G.I.F.)" as of August 2020.); FRA: 42,700 (Note: France sales figures for "Last Friday Night (T.G.I.F.)" as of December 2011.); UK: 1,400,000 (Note: United Kingdom sales figures for "Last Friday Night (T.G.I.F.)" as of June 2024.)	RIAA: 6× Platinum; ARIA: 11× Platinum; BPI: 3× Platinum; BVMI: Platinum; FIMI: Platinum; IFPI AUT: Platinum; IFPI SWI: Gold; MC: Diamond; RMNZ: 5× Platinum; SNEP: Diamond	Teenage Dream
"The One That Got Away"	2011	3	27	9	2	30	23	39	12	22	18	US: 2,800,000 (Note: United States sales figures for "The One That Got Away" as of February 2017.); FRA: 29,000 (Note: France sales figures for "The One That Got Away".); UK: 1,698,970 (Note: United Kingdom sales figures for "The One That Got Away" as of July 2026.)	RIAA: 5× Platinum; ARIA: 7× Platinum; BPI: 3× Platinum; BVMI: Platinum; FIMI: Gold; IFPI AUT: Platinum; MC: 7× Platinum; RMNZ: 4× Platinum; SNEP: Platinum	Teenage Dream
"Part of Me"	2012	1	5	18	1	13	20	14	1	33	1	US: 2,900,000 (Note: United States sales figures for "Part of Me" as of February 2017.); FRA: 36,800 (Note: France sales figures for "Part of Me" as of December 2012.); UK: 131,831 (Note: United Kingdom sales figures for "Part of Me" as of March 2012.)	RIAA: 5× Platinum; ARIA: 7× Platinum; BPI: Platinum; BVMI: Gold; FIMI: Gold; IFPI AUT: Platinum; MC: 6× Platinum; RMNZ: 3× Platinum; SNEP: Platinum	Teenage Dream: The Complete Confection
"Wide Awake"	2012	2	4	28	1	33	39	11	1	21	9	US: 3,500,000 (Note: United States sales figures for "Wide Awake" as of August 2020.); FRA: 27,300 (Note: France sales figures for "Wide Awake".); UK: 325,000 (Note: United Kingdom sales figures for "Wide Awake" as of August 2013.)	RIAA: 5× Platinum; ARIA: 7× Platinum; BPI: Platinum; FIMI: Platinum; IFPI AUT: Gold; MC: 6× Platinum; RMNZ: 2× Platinum; SNEP: Gold	Teenage Dream: The Complete Confection
"Roar"	2013	1	1	1	1	5	2	4	1	3	1	US: 6,600,000 (Note: United States sales figures for "Roar" as of August 2020.); AUS: 560,000 (Note: Australia sales figures for "Roar" as of January 2014.); CAN: 488,000 (Note: Canada sales figures for "Roar" as of December 2013.); FRA: 105,000 (Note: France sales figures for "Roar" as of June 2017.); UK: 2,800,000 (Note: United Kingdom sales figures for "Roar" as of June 2024.)	RIAA: 15× Platinum (Diamond); ARIA: 22× Platinum; BPI: 5× Platinum; BVMI: 3× Gold; FIMI: 2× Platinum; IFPI AUT: 2× Platinum; MC: Diamond; RMNZ: 7× Platinum; SNEP: Diamond	Prism
"Unconditionally"	2013	14	11	16	13	38	22	6	26	27	25	US: 1,300,000 (Note: United States figures for "Unconditionally" as of February 2017.); FRA: 21,200 (Note: France sales figures for "Unconditionally".)	RIAA: 2× Platinum; ARIA: 4× Platinum; BPI: Platinum; BVMI: Gold; FIMI: Platinum; IFPI AUT: Gold; MC: 3× Platinum; RMNZ: Platinum; SNEP: Gold	Prism
"Dark Horse" (featuring Juicy J)	2013	1	— (Note: "Dark Horse" was not allowed to enter the ARIA Singles Chart, but peaked at number five on the ARIA Digital Tracks Chart.)	2	1	6	6	5	2	4	4	US: 6,400,000 (Note: United States sales figures for "Dark Horse" as of August 2020.); CAN: 391,000 (Note: Canada sales figures for "Dark Horse" as of December 2014.); FRA: 75,000 (Note: France sales figures for "Dark Horse" as of June 2017.); UK: 1,700,000 (Note: United Kingdom sales figures for "Dark Horse" as of June 2024.)	RIAA: 11× Platinum (Diamond); ARIA: 13× Platinum; BPI: 3× Platinum; BVMI: 3× Gold; FIMI: 3× Platinum; IFPI AUT: 2× Platinum; MC: Diamond; RMNZ: 5× Platinum; SNEP: Diamond	Prism
"Birthday"	2014	17	25	51	7	57	69	49	17	—	22	FRA: 11,500 (Note: France sales figures for "Birthday".)	RIAA: Platinum; ARIA: 3× Platinum; BPI: Gold; FIMI: Gold; MC: 2× Platinum; RMNZ: Platinum	Prism
"This Is How We Do"	2014	24	18	14	9	41	34	41	13	41	33	US: 520,885 (Note: United States sales figures for "This Is How We Do" as of November 2014.); FRA: 10,500 (Note: France sales figures for "This Is How We Do".)	RIAA: 2× Platinum; ARIA: 3× Platinum; BPI: Silver; FIMI: Gold; MC: 2× Platinum; RMNZ: Platinum	Prism
"Rise"	2016	11	1	23	13	3	39	51	26	15	25	US: 263,000 (Note: United States sales figures for "Rise", including its first three weeks (216,000) and fourth week (47,000).); FRA: 6,500 (Note: France sales figures for "Rise".); UK: 22,497 (Note: United Kingdom first-week sales figures for "Rise".)	RIAA: Platinum; ARIA: 2× Platinum; BPI: Silver; FIMI: Gold; RMNZ: Gold	Non-album single
"Chained to the Rhythm" (featuring Skip Marley)	2017	4	4	7	3	20	6	10	8	6	5	US: 590,136 (Note: United States sales figures for "Chained to the Rhythm" as of June 2017.); CAN: 114,799 (Note: Canada sales figures for "Chained to the Rhythm" as of January 2018.); FRA: 41,100 (Note: France sales figures for "Chained to the Rhythm" as of December 2017.); GER: 88,669 (Note: Germany sales figures for "Chained to the Rhythm" as of January 2018.)	RIAA: 2× Platinum; ARIA: 4× Platinum; BPI: Platinum; BVMI: Platinum; FIMI: 2× Platinum; IFPI AUT: Gold; MC: 3× Platinum; RMNZ: Platinum; SNEP: Diamond	Witness
"Bon Appétit" (featuring Migos)	2017	59	35	64	14	21	47	48	— (Note: "Bon Appétit" did not enter the NZ Top 40 Singles Chart, but peaked at number two on the NZ Heatseeker Singles Chart.)	36	37	US: 50,259 (Note: United States sales figures for "Bon Appétit" as of June 2017.); AUS: 4,358 (Note: Australia first-week sales figures for "Bon Appétit".); FRA: 13,400 (Note: France sales figures for "Bon Appétit".); GER: 20,301 (Note: Germany sales figures for "Bon Appétit" as of August 2017.)	RIAA: Platinum; ARIA: Platinum; BPI: Gold; BVMI: Gold; FIMI: Platinum; MC: Gold; RMNZ: Gold; SNEP: Platinum	Witness
"Swish Swish" (featuring Nicki Minaj)	2017	46	22	69	13	117	76	73	— (Note: "Swish Swish" did not enter the NZ Top 40 Singles Chart, but peaked at number three on the NZ Heatseeker Singles Chart.)	46	19	US: 165,288 (Note: United States sales figures for "Swish Swish" as of September 2017.); FRA: 8,700 (Note: France sales figures for "Swish Swish".)	RIAA: Platinum; ARIA: 2× Platinum; BPI: Platinum; BVMI: Gold; FIMI: Gold; MC: Platinum; RMNZ: Platinum; SNEP: Gold	Witness
"Save as Draft"	2017	— (Note: "Save as Draft" did not enter the US Billboard Hot 100, but peaked at number 14 on the Billboard Adult Contemporary Chart.)	—	—	—	—	—	—	—	—	—			Witness
"Hey Hey Hey"	2018	—	—	—	—	—	—	—	— (Note: "Hey Hey Hey" did not enter the NZ Top 40 Singles Chart, but peaked at number five on the NZ Heatseeker Singles Chart.)	—	—			Witness
"Cozy Little Christmas"	2018	53	146	36	—	—	32	61	—	49	22		RIAA: Platinum; ARIA: Gold; BPI: Gold; BVMI: Gold; IFPI AUT: Platinum	Non-album singles
"365" (with Zedd)	2019	86	38	70	52	129	72	68	— (Note: "365" did not enter the NZ Top 40 Singles Chart, but peaked at number three on the NZ Hot Singles Chart.)	59	37	US: 10,000 (Note: United States first-week sales figures for "365".); FRA: 850 (Note: France sales figures for "365".); UK: 12,440 (Note: United Kingdom first-week sales figures for "365".)	ARIA: Platinum; BPI: Silver; MC: Platinum; RMNZ: Gold	Non-album singles
"Con Calma" (remix with Daddy Yankee featuring Snow)	2019	22	—	—	6	—	—	—	—	—	66	US: 120,000 (Note: United States sales figures for "Con Calma" (remix) as of July 2019.)	RIAA: 41× Platinum (Latin); BPI: Gold; MC: 4× Platinum	Non-album singles
"Never Really Over"	2019	15	7	29	7	102	47	32	14	21	12	US: 31,000 (Note: United States first-week sales figures for "Never Really Over".); FRA: 3,700 (Note: France sales figures for "Never Really Over".); UK: 53,094 (Note: United Kingdom sales figures for "Never Really Over", including its first week (26,881) and third week (26,213).)	RIAA: Platinum; ARIA: 4× Platinum; BPI: Platinum; FIMI: Gold; IFPI AUT: Gold; MC: 3× Platinum; RMNZ: 2× Platinum	Smile
"Small Talk" (Note: "Small Talk" and "Never Worn White" were only included on the fan and Japanese CD editions of Smile.)	2019	81	33	—	56	— (Note: "Small Talk" did not enter the SNEP Singles Chart, but peaked at number 65 on the SNEP Sales Chart.)	—	—	— (Note: "Small Talk" did not enter the NZ Top 40 Singles Chart, but peaked at number one on the NZ Hot Singles Chart.)	91	43	UK: 10,906 (Note: United Kingdom first-week sales figures for "Small Talk".)	ARIA: Gold	Non-album single
"Harleys in Hawaii"	2019	— (Note: "Harleys in Hawaii" did not enter the US Billboard Hot 100, but peaked at number 10 on the Bubbling Under Hot 100 chart.)	36	—	71	— (Note: "Harleys in Hawaii" did not enter the SNEP Singles Chart, but peaked at number 85 on the SNEP Sales Chart.)	—	—	— (Note: "Harleys in Hawaii" did not enter the NZ Top 40 Singles Chart, but peaked at number one on the NZ Hot Singles Chart.)	72	45	UK: 10,087 (Note: United Kingdom first-week sales figures for "Harleys in Hawaii".)	RIAA: Gold; ARIA: Platinum; BPI: Silver; MC: Platinum; RMNZ: Platinum; SNEP: Gold	Smile
"—" denotes a recording that did not chart in that territory.

==== 2020s ====
List of singles as lead artist released in the 2020s, showing year released, selected chart positions, certifications, and originating album
Title	Year	Peak chart positions										Certifications	Album
Title	Year	US	AUS	BEL (FL)	CAN	IRE	ITA	NZ Hot	SWI	UK	WW	Certifications	Album
"Never Worn White"	2020	— (Note: "Never Worn White" did not enter the US Billboard Hot 100, but peaked at number 12 on the Bubbling Under Hot 100 chart.)	79	— (Note: "Never Worn White" did not enter the Ultratop 50, but peaked at number 25 on the Ultratip Bubbling Under chart.)	95	85	—	12	—	97	—		Non-album single
"Daisies"	2020	40	37	— (Note: "Daisies" did not enter the Ultratop 50, but peaked at number two on the Ultratip Bubbling Under chart.)	37	27	70	3	57	37	—	RIAA: Gold; ARIA: Platinum; BPI: Silver; MC: Platinum; RMNZ: Gold	Smile
"Smile"	2020	— (Note: "Smile" did not enter the US Billboard Hot 100, but peaked at number 21 on the Bubbling Under Hot 100 chart.)	117	— (Note: "Smile" did not enter the Ultratop 50, but peaked at number 12 on the Ultratip Bubbling Under chart.)	— (Note: "Smile" did not enter the Canadian Hot 100, but peaked at number 23 on the Canadian Digital Song Sales chart.)	99	—	10	—	73	—	RIAA: Gold; ARIA: Platinum; MC: Gold	Smile
"Electric"	2021	— (Note: "Electric" did not enter the US Billboard Hot 100, but peaked at number 25 on the Digital Songs chart.)	—	—	97	—	—	19	—	— (Note: "Electric" did not enter the UK Singles Chart, but peaked at number 28 on the UK Singles Sales Chart.)	120		Pokémon 25: The Album
"When I'm Gone" (with Alesso)	2021	90	96	25	54	59	—	5	—	49	82	RIAA: Gold; BPI: Silver; FIMI: Gold; RMNZ: Gold	Non-album single
"Woman's World"	2024	63	143	35	77	65	—	6	— (Note: "Woman's World" did not enter the Swiss Singles Chart, but peaked at number nine on the Swiss Airplay Chart.)	47	65		143
"Lifetimes"	2024	— (Note: "Lifetimes" did not enter the US Billboard Hot 100, but peaked at number 15 on the Bubbling Under Hot 100 chart.)	—	—	—	—	—	11	—	89	—		143
"I'm His, He's Mine" (featuring Doechii)	2024	— (Note: "I'm His, He's Mine" did not enter the US Billboard Hot 100, but peaked at number 24 on the Bubbling Under Hot 100 chart.)	—	—	—	—	—	8	—	— (Note: "I'm His, He's Mine" did not enter the UK Singles Chart, but peaked at number 47 on the UK Singles Sales Chart.)	—		143
"OK"	2024	—	—	—	—	—	—	39	—	—	—		1432
"Bandaids"	2025	— (Note: "Bandaids" did not enter the US Billboard Hot 100, but peaked at number 15 on the Bubbling Under Hot 100 chart.)	135	—	74	99	—	6	— (Note: "Bandaids" did not enter the Swiss Singles Chart, but peaked at number four on the Swiss Airplay Chart.)	61	—		The Vent Sessions
"Watch It Burn"	2026	—	—	—	—	—	—	9	—	—	—		The Vent Sessions
"—" denotes a recording that did not chart in that territory.

=== As featured artist ===
List of singles as featured artist, showing year released, selected chart positions, sales, certifications, and originating album
Title	Year	Peak chart positions										Sales	Certifications	Album
Title	Year	US	AUS	AUT	CAN	FRA	GER	ITA	NZ	SWI	UK	Sales	Certifications	Album
"Starstrukk" (3OH!3 featuring Katy Perry)	2009	66	4	48	31	—	—	—	16	—	3	US: 1,000,000 (Note: United States sales figures for "Starstrukk" as of June 2010.); UK: 580,000 (Note: United Kingdom sales figures for "Starstrukk" as of August 2013.)	RIAA: 2× Platinum; ARIA: 2× Platinum; BPI: Platinum; MC: 2× Platinum; RMNZ: Platinum	Want
"If We Ever Meet Again" (Timbaland featuring Katy Perry)	2009	37	9	10	4	5	9	10	1	7	3	US: 882,000 (Note: United States sales figures for "If We Ever Meet Again" as of June 2011.); FRA: 100,100 (Note: France sales figures for "If We Ever Meet Again" as of December 2014.); UK: 434,000 (Note: United Kingdom sales figures for "If We Ever Meet Again" as of February 2017.)	ARIA: Platinum; BPI: Platinum; BVMI: Gold; FIMI: Gold; MC: 2× Platinum; RMNZ: 3× Platinum	Shock Value II
"Who You Love" (John Mayer featuring Katy Perry)	2013	48	83	—	70	—	—	—	—	—	—	US: 35,000 (Note: United States first-week sales figures for "Who You Love".)	RIAA: Gold; ARIA: Gold; IFPI DEN: Gold; RMNZ: Gold	Paradise Valley
"Feels" (Calvin Harris featuring Pharrell Williams, Katy Perry and Big Sean)	2017	20	3	5	5	6	9	20	2	6	1	US: 335,460 (Note: United States sales figures for "Feels" as of October 2017.); FRA: 41,000 (Note: France sales figures for "Feels" as of December 2017.); UK: 1,600,000 (Note: United Kingdom sales figures for "Feels" as of June 2024.)	RIAA: 3× Platinum; ARIA: 6× Platinum; BPI: 3× Platinum; BVMI: Platinum; FIMI: 2× Platinum; IFPI AUT: Platinum; IFPI SWI: Platinum; MC: 6× Platinum; RMNZ: 5× Platinum; SNEP: Diamond	Funk Wav Bounces Vol. 1
"—" denotes items which did not chart in that country.

=== Promotional singles ===
List of promotional singles, showing year released, selected chart positions, sales, certifications, and originating album
Title	Year	Peak chart positions										Sales	Certifications	Album
Title	Year	US	AUS	AUT	BEL (WA)	CAN	FRA	ITA	NZ	SPA	UK	Sales	Certifications	Album
"Ur So Gay"	2007	—	146	—	—	—	—	—	—	—	—		RIAA: Gold	Ur So Gay and One of the Boys
"Not Like the Movies"	2010	53	—	—	—	41	—	—	—	—	—	US: 57,000 (Note: United States first-week sales figures for "Not Like the Movies".)	RIAA: Gold; ARIA: Gold	Teenage Dream
"Circle the Drain"	2010	58	—	—	—	30	—	—	36	—	—	US: 50,000 (Note: United States first-week sales figures for "Circle the Drain".)		Teenage Dream
"Peacock" (Cory Enemy and Mia Moretti remix)	2012	—	—	—	—	—	—	—	—	—	—			Teenage Dream
"Walking on Air"	2013	34	— (Note: "Walking on Air" did not enter the ARIA Singles Chart, but peaked at number 18 on the ARIA Digital Tracks Chart.)	35	30	12	25	20	12	15	80	US: 150,000 (Note: United States sales figures for "Walking on Air" as of November 2013.)	ARIA: Gold; RMNZ: Gold	Prism
"Every Day Is a Holiday"	2015	—	—	—	—	—	—	—	—	—	—			Non-album promotional single
"Waving Through a Window"	2018	—	—	—	—	—	—	—	—	—	—			Dear Evan Hansen
"What Makes a Woman"	2020	—	—	—	—	—	—	—	— (Note: "What Makes a Woman" did not enter the NZ Top 40 Singles Chart, but peaked at number 40 on the NZ Hot Singles Chart.)	—	—			Smile
"Resilient" (Tiësto remix featuring Aitana)	2020	—	—	—	— (Note: "Resilient" (Tiësto remix) did not enter the Ultratop 50, but peaked at number 27 on the Ultratip Bubbling Under chart.)	—	—	—	—	56	—			Non-album promotional single
"Cry About It Later" (Luísa Sonza and Bruno Martini remix)	2021	—	—	—	—	—	—	—	— (Note: "Cry About It Later" (remix) did not enter the NZ Top 40 Singles Chart, but peaked at number 40 on the NZ Hot Singles Chart.)	—	—			Non-album promotional single
"All You Need Is Love"	2021	—	—	—	—	—	—	—	—	—	—			Non-album promotional single
"Where We Started" (with Thomas Rhett)	2022	— (Note: "Where We Started" did not enter the US Billboard Hot 100, but peaked at number 29 on the Digital Songs chart.)	—	—	—	— (Note: "Where We Started" did not enter the Canadian Hot 100, but peaked at number 48 on the Canadian Digital Song Sales.)	—	—	— (Note: "Where We Started" did not enter the NZ Top 40 Singles Chart, but peaked at number 29 on the NZ Hot Singles Chart.)	—	—			Where We Started
"Legendary Lovers (Save Me)" (with Chief Keef)	2026	—	70	—	—	—	—	—	— (Note: "Legendary Lovers (Save Me)" did not enter the NZ Top 40 Singles Chart, but peaked at number seven on the NZ Hot Singles Chart.)	—	—			Non-album promotional single
"—" denotes items which did not chart in that country.

== Other charted or certified songs ==
=== 2000s ===
List of other charted or certified songs in the 2000s, showing year released, selected chart positions, certifications, and originating album
Title	Year	Peak chart positions							Certifications	Album
Title	Year	US Christ. CHR	US Christ. Rock	AUS	CIS	NZ	RUS	UKR	Certifications	Album
"Trust in Me"	2001	—	17	—	—	—	—	—		Katy Hudson
"Search Me"	2001	23	—	—	—	—	—	—		Katy Hudson
"I Kissed a Girl" (Jason Nevins Funkrokr edit)	2008	—	—	—	104	—	94	—		Non-album songs
"I Kissed a Girl" (Norman and Attalla radio edit)	2008	—	—	—	—	—	—	123		Non-album songs
"One of the Boys"	2008	—	—	40	—	—	—	—	ARIA: Gold	One of the Boys
"If You Can Afford Me"	2008	—	—	—	—	28	—	—		One of the Boys
"—" denotes items which did not chart in that country.

=== 2010s ===
List of other charted or certified songs in the 2010s, showing year released, selected chart positions, sales, certifications, and originating album
Title	Year	Peak chart positions										Sales	Certifications	Album
Title	Year	US Bub.	AUT	CAN	CZR	GER	KOR Intl.	NOR	POL	SVK	UK	Sales	Certifications	Album
"Peacock"	2010	5	—	56	—	—	— (Note: "Peacock" did not enter the Gaon International Digital Chart, but peaked at number 101 on the Gaon International Download Chart.)	—	—	—	125	US: 643,000 (Note: United States sales figures for "Peacock" as of August 2013.); UK: 46,000 (Note: United Kingdom sales figures for "Peacock" as of May 2019.)	RIAA: Platinum; MC: Platinum	Teenage Dream
"Who Am I Living For?"	2010	—	—	—	—	—	— (Note: "Who Am I Living For?" did not enter the Gaon International Digital Chart, but peaked at number 158 on the Gaon International Download Chart.)	—	—	—	—			Teenage Dream
"Pearl"	2010	—	—	—	—	—	— (Note: "Pearl" did not enter the Gaon International Digital Chart, but peaked at number 150 on the Gaon International Download Chart.)	—	—	—	—			Teenage Dream
"Hummingbird Heartbeat"	2010	—	—	—	—	—	— (Note: "Hummingbird Heartbeat" did not enter the Gaon International Digital Chart, but peaked at number 124 on the Gaon International Download Chart.)	—	—	—	—	US: 82,000 (Note: United States sales figures for "Hummingbird Heartbeat" as of September 2011.)		Teenage Dream
"Dressin' Up"	2012	—	—	—	—	—	—	—	—	—	109			Teenage Dream: The Complete Confection
"Tommie Sunshine's Megasix Smash-Up"	2012	—	—	—	—	—	—	—	—	—	183			Teenage Dream: The Complete Confection
"Legendary Lovers"	2013	— (Note: "Legendary Lovers" did not enter the US Bubbling Under Hot 100, but peaked at number 50 on the Pop Digital Songs chart.)	34	—	29	57	92	62	33	72	—	KOR: 2,330 (Note: South Korea first-week sales figures for Prism tracks.)	BPI: Silver; RMNZ: Gold	Prism
"International Smile"	2013	—	—	—	—	—	107	—	—	—	—	KOR: 2,112		Prism
"Ghost"	2013	—	—	—	—	—	127	—	—	—	—	KOR: 1,916		Prism
"Love Me"	2013	—	—	—	—	—	120	—	—	—	—	KOR: 2,007		Prism
"This Moment"	2013	—	—	—	—	—	111	—	—	—	—	KOR: 2,044		Prism
"Double Rainbow"	2013	—	—	—	—	—	117	—	—	—	—	KOR: 1,838		Prism
"By the Grace of God"	2013	10	—	— (Note: "By the Grace of God" did not enter the Canadian Hot 100, but peaked at number 70 on the Canadian Digital Song Sales.)	—	—	105	—	—	—	179	KOR: 2,104		Prism
"Spiritual"	2013	—	—	—	—	—	146	—	—	—	—	KOR: 1,655		Prism
"It Takes Two"	2013	—	—	—	—	—	112	—	—	—	180	KOR: 1,809		Prism
"Choose Your Battles"	2013	—	—	—	—	—	154	—	—	—	—	KOR: 1,587		Prism
"—" denotes items which did not chart in that country.

=== 2020s ===
List of other charted songs in the 2020s, showing year released, selected chart positions, and originating album
Title	Year	Peak chart positions										Album
Title	Year	ARG Anglo Air.	BOL Anglo Air.	CAN Dig.	FRA Sales	NZ Hot	NOR	PAN Anglo Air.	UK DL	URY Anglo Air.	VE Anglo	Album
"Cry About It Later"	2020	—	—	34	125	8	—	—	95	—	34	Smile
"Gimme Gimme" (featuring 21 Savage)	2024	—	—	—	—	29	—	—	—	—	—	143
"Gorgeous" (featuring Kim Petras)	2024	—	—	—	—	17	—	—	—	—	—	143
"Crush"	2024	3	3	—	—	—	—	3	—	3	—	143
"Wonder"	2024	—	—	—	—	—	54	—	—	—	—	143
"—" denotes items which did not chart in that country.
