= I'm His, He's Mine =

2024 single by Katy Perry featuring Doechii

Single by Katy Perry featuring Doechii

from the album 143
- Released: September 13, 2024
- Studio: Eightysevenfourteen Studios (Los Angeles); Somewhere Studios (Santa Barbara)
- Genre: House
- Length: 3:18
- Label: Capitol
- Songwriters: Katy Perry; Jaylah Hickmon; Łukasz Gottwald; Rocco Valdes; Ryan Ogren; Theron Thomas; Gamal Lewis; Ferras Alqaisi; Crystal Waters; Neal Conway
- Producers: Dr. Luke; Rocco Did It Again!

Katy Perry singles chronology
"Lifetimes" (2024)	"I'm His, He's Mine" (2024)	"OK" (2024)

Doechii singles chronology
"Boom Bap" (2024)	"I'm His, He's Mine" (2024)	"I Hate Your Ex-Girlfriend" (2024)

Music video
- "I'm His, He's Mine" on YouTube

"I'm His, He's Mine" (stylized in all caps) is a song by the American singer-songwriter Katy Perry featuring American rapper Doechii, from Perry's seventh studio album 143 (2024). It was released as the third single through Capitol Records alongside an accompanying music video on September 13, 2024, and was sent to contemporary hit radio on October 1, 2024, and Italian radio on October 8, 2024.

The dance-pop and hip hop song was sampled from American singer Crystal Waters' dance classic "Gypsy Woman" (1991). Its lyrics and use of the sampled song faced criticism while Doechii's involvement received some praise from critics. Commercially, the song was a success in Latin America.

== Release and promotion ==
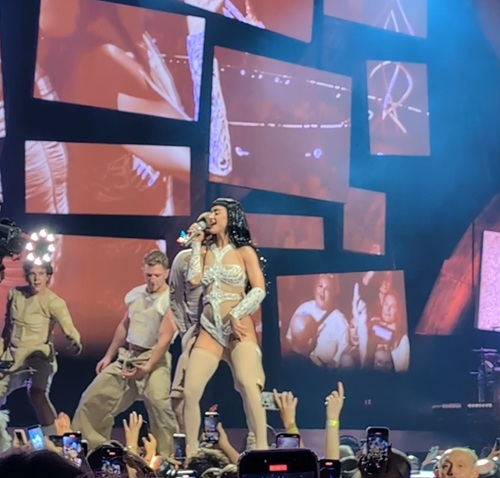
Perry performing "I'm His, He's Mine" on The Lifetimes Tour

On July 10, 2024, shortly before the release of previous single "Woman's World", Perry teased "I'm His, He's Mine" on a social media livestream along with other songs off of 143. Perry later announced the release date of the song on social media on September 10, 2024. The song was released on September 13, 2024.

Perry and Doechii performed the song for the first time at the 2024 MTV Video Music Awards as part of Perry's medley performance for the Michael Jackson Video Vanguard Award on September 11, 2024. Perry later sang the track solo at Rock in Rio on September 20, 2024. On December 8, 2024, she performed the song at 2024 Jingle Bell Ball.

== Composition ==
Perry co-wrote "I'm His, He's Mine" with featured artist Doechii, as well as LunchMoney Lewis, Ferras, Ryan Ogren, Theron Thomas, and its producers Dr. Luke and Rocco Valdes. The song contains samples from "Gypsy Woman", written by Neal Conway and Crystal Waters. The song blends Perry's dance-pop sound with Doechii's sharp, edgy rap flow.

== Critical reception ==
Chris DeVille of Stereogum described "I'm His, He's Mine" as "perfectly competent" but also being "tryhard energy" and "poisoned". He added that the featured artist, Doechii, "can't save it." Writing for Slant Magazine, Tom Williams described the song as "plodding", however praised Doechii for delivering a "genuinely charismatic and dynamic performance". Cynthia Pankhurst from Exclaim! reviewed the lyricism having "much substance as a baby's speech" and critiqued the use of the "Gypsy Woman" sample by saying "Crystal Waters doesn't deserve this", but described the Doechii feature as a "redeemable factor" and her bars as "clever".

In slightly more positive reviews, Alexa Camp of Slant Magazine described the song a "low-key slow burner". Avery Heeringa of Melodic Magazine highlighted the song as one of the "finer moments" on 143, despite relying on "overly-repetitive 'la da dee's' for earworm attractiveness".

== Chart performance ==
"I'm His, He's Mine" reached number 24 on the Bubbling Under Hot 100 and number 9 on the Hot Dance/Pop Songs. The song reached number 46 on the UK Singles Downloads Chart. The song also reached number 8 on the New Zealand Hot Singles chart.

== Music video ==
The music video was directed by Torso and released shortly after the song on September 13. The video begins with Perry skydiving with her lover, before transitioning to the streets of Barcelona, where she dances on the hood of a moving chrome Corvette. Great parts of the music video was filmed at the Autonomous University of Barcelona, in Cerdanyola del Vallès. Doechii is seen hanging from a flying drone, before landing on the shoulders of her lover.

== Charts ==
=== Weekly charts ===
Weekly chart performance
Chart (2024–2025)	Peak position
Argentina Anglo (Monitor Latino)	14
Colombia Anglo (Monitor Latino)	24
Costa Rica Anglo (Monitor Latino)	15
Dominican Republic Anglo (Monitor Latino)	18
Ecuador Anglo (Monitor Latino)	13
El Salvador Anglo (Monitor Latino)	2
Guatemala Anglo (Monitor Latino)	8
Italy Airplay (EarOne)	37
Japan Hot Overseas (Billboard Japan)	14
Malta Airplay (Radiomonitor)	8
New Zealand Hot Singles (RMNZ)	8
Nicaragua Anglo (Monitor Latino)	1
Peru Anglo (Monitor Latino)	14
Puerto Rico Anglo (Monitor Latino)	9
Poland (Polish Airplay Top 100)	89
San Marino Airplay (SMRTV Top 50)	31
UK Singles Sales (OCC)	47
Uruguay Anglo (Monitor Latino)	10
US Bubbling Under Hot 100 (Billboard)	24
US Pop Airplay (Billboard)	26
US Hot Dance/Pop Songs (Billboard)	9
Venezuela Anglo (Monitor Latino)	13

=== Year-end charts ===
Year-end chart performance
Chart (2025)	Position
Nicaragua Anglo Airplay (Monitor Latino)	57

== Certifications ==
Certifications for "I'm His, He's Mine"
Region	Certification	Certified units/sales
Brazil (Pro-Música Brasil)	Platinum	40,000^{‡}
^{‡} Sales+streaming figures based on certification alone.

== Release history ==
Release history for "I'm His, He's Mine"
Region	Date	Format(s)	Label	Ref.
Various	September 13, 2024	Digital download; streaming	Capitol	
United States	October 1, 2024	Contemporary hit radio	Capitol	
Italy	October 8, 2024	Radio airplay	Capitol	
