= Lifetimes (song) =

2024 single by Katy Perry

Single by Katy Perry

from the album 143
- Released: August 8, 2024
- Studio: eightysevenfourteen studios (Los Angeles, CA); Somewhere Studios (Santa Barbara, CA)
- Genre: Italo house; pop; dance
- Length: 3:12
- Label: Capitol
- Songwriters: Katy Perry; Łukasz Gottwald; Vaughn Oliver; Rocco Valdes; Ryan Ogren; Theron Thomas; Gamal Lewis; Sarah Hudson
- Producers: Dr. Luke; Oliver

Katy Perry singles chronology
"Woman's World" (2024)	"Lifetimes" (2024)	"I'm His, He's Mine" (2024)

Music video
- "Lifetimes" on YouTube

"Lifetimes" is a song by the American singer-songwriter Katy Perry from her seventh studio album, 143 (2024). It was released as the second single through Capitol Records alongside an accompanying music video on August 8, 2024. The Italo house dance song was inspired by Perry's love for her daughter.

The music video was shot in the Balearic Islands in Spain, whose provincial government said that filming had been conducted without authorization and could have caused environmental damage to the highly protected dunes of S'Espalmador. Capitol Records insisted that approval had previously been given to record footage there. "Lifetimes" respectively reached numbers 1 in Hungary, 40 in the Czech Republic, 42 in Venezuela, 45 in Panama, and 89 in the United Kingdom.

== Composition ==
Perry co-wrote "Lifetimes" with LunchMoney Lewis, Rocco Valdes, Ryan Ogren, Sarah Hudson, Theron Thomas, and its producers Vaughn Oliver and Dr. Luke. The singer explained that it is inspired by her daughter Daisy Dove Bloom: "It is funny how sometimes you're looking for your soulmate in a partner. [...] For me it came in the form of Daisy. I wrote 'Lifetimes' about her. Every night, before we go to sleep, I say, 'I love you,' and then I ask, 'Will you find me in every lifetime?' and she says, 'Yes'." The song is primarily an Italo house track with elements of pop and dance music.

== Critical reception ==
Billboard author Rania Aniftos found "Lifetimes" to be "the ultimate track for a beach club in the Mediterranean", highlighting its ecstatic, romantic theme. Slant Magazine's Tom Williams believed that even though the track is "built around a generic house beat", its melodic hook is "relatively strong", serving as a reminder that Perry and her team "are still capable of writing some earworms". According to Slate's Carl Wilson, "Lifetimes" is a "passable" song, albeit "seems several years too late to catch the same wave as Dua Lipa and Beyoncé's tributes to house and disco". The New York Times's Lindsay Zoladz found it a "blithe" single.

The New Yorker's Amanda Petrusich considered the track to be "fine", though "it also sounds like a song that will soon be playing—endlessly, loudly—at a club without a bouncer, a club at an all-inclusive island resort (off-season), a club that serves chicken fingers." Callie Ahlgrim of Business Insider described "Lifetimes" as a generic and formulaic song with repetitive lyrics, seeing Perry attempt to emulate the sound of Teenage Dream (2010). The Arts Desk's Guy Oddy called the song "rather anonymous" and over-reliant on Auto-Tune. Rich Juzwiak of Pitchfork believed the lyrics "I'll love you for life," "I'm gonna love you till the end," and "Baby you and me for infinity" were redundant and wrote: "The tension-and-release low end of the track yields not drops but gentle puts. This is kiddie-coaster EDM." The Daily Telegraph's Helen Brown felt the song "simply flatlines".

== Music video ==
=== Synopsis ===
The music video, which was released alongside the song, was directed by Stillz and shot in the Balearic Islands of Spain. It features Perry riding a boat off the coast of Ibiza, being driven by a biker across Formentera, and playing water sports with a group of people in a bikini on a beach before dancing with a DJ at a nightclub. During the video, she revealed the track list for 143.

=== Investigation ===
On August 13, 2024, the Department of Environment and Mobility of the Government of the Balearic Islands opened an investigation on Perry to determine whether the music video caused environmental damage to the highly protected dunes of S'Espalmador; claiming her production crew did not obtain proper authorization to film on the ecologically rich area. A spokesperson for Perry's record label, Capitol Records, told Variety that her video crew secured filming permits before production and received "verbal approval" from the Directorate-General for the Coast and the Sea to film on the dunes. Capitol stressed they "adhered to all regulations associated with filming in this area and have the utmost respect for this location and the officials tasked with protecting it." Although the music video is not necessarily a "crime against the environment", it was treated as an infringement, as filming can be authorized with the proper permits.

== Live performances ==
Perry performed the song in a medley at the 2024 MTV Video Music Awards on September 11, 2024. Later that month, she sang it again at the 2024 AFL Grand Final pre match entertainment. Perry performed "Lifetimes" as the penultimate song of The Lifetimes Tour.

== Usage in media ==
The song was used in the fourth season of the comedy-drama television series Hacks, in the episode entitled "Clickable Face". The song is also used in the video game Dream League Soccer 2026.

== Charts ==
=== Weekly charts ===
Weekly chart performance
Chart (2024–2025)	Peak position
Argentina Anglo (Monitor Latino)	5
Austria Airplay (MusicTrace)	43
Belarus Airplay (TopHit)	44
Chile Anglo (Monitor Latino)	10
CIS Airplay (TopHit)	39
Colombia Anglo (Monitor Latino)	10
Costa Rica Anglo (Monitor Latino)	3
Croatia International Airplay (Top lista)	27
Czech Republic Airplay (ČNS IFPI)	40
Ecuador Anglo (Monitor Latino)	6
El Salvador Anglo (Monitor Latino)	4
Estonia Airplay (TopHit)	119
Guatemala (Monitor Latino)	19
Hungary (Dance Top 40)	40
Hungary (Rádiós Top 40)	1
Japan Hot Overseas (Billboard Japan)	7
Kazakhstan Airplay (TopHit)	72
Latvia Airplay (LaIPA)	11
Lithuania Airplay (TopHit)	10
Malta Airplay (Radiomonitor)	7
Mexico Anglo (Monitor Latino)	8
Moldova Airplay (TopHit)	184
New Zealand Hot Singles (RMNZ)	11
Nicaragua (Monitor Latino)	18
North Macedonia Airplay (Radiomonitor)	3
Panama (PRODUCE)	45
Panama Anglo (Monitor Latino)	7
Paraguay (Monitor Latino)	16
Peru Anglo (Monitor Latino)	14
Poland (Polish Airplay Top 100)	34
Puerto Rico Anglo (Monitor Latino)	8
Russia Airplay (TopHit)	38
UK Singles (Official Charts)	89
Uruguay Anglo (Monitor Latino)	10
US Bubbling Under Hot 100 (Billboard)	15
Venezuela (Record Report)	42

=== Monthly charts ===
Monthly chart performance
Chart (2024)	Peak position
Belarus Airplay (TopHit)	50
CIS Airplay (TopHit)	41
Czech Republic (Rádio Top 100)	90
Latvia Airplay (TopHit)	1
Lithuania Airplay (TopHit)	32
Paraguay Airplay (SGP)	96

=== Year-end charts ===
Year-end chart performance
Chart (2025)	Position
Argentina Anglo Airplay (Monitor Latino)	53
Ecuador Anglo Airplay (Monitor Latino)	38
Hungary (Rádiós Top 40)	6
Nicaragua Anglo Airplay (Monitor Latino)	68

== Certifications ==
Certifications for "Lifetimes"
Region	Certification	Certified units/sales
Brazil (Pro-Música Brasil)	Platinum	40,000^{‡}
^{‡} Sales+streaming figures based on certification alone.
