= 143 (Katy Perry album) =

2024 studio album by Katy Perry

- Standard cover

Studio album by Katy Perry
- Released: September 20, 2024
- Studios: Eightysevenfourteen (Los Angeles); Somewhere (Santa Barbara); Stellar House (Venice)
- Genres: Pop; dance-pop
- Length: 33:34
- Label: Capitol
- Producers: Cirkut; Dr. Luke; Aaron Joseph; KBeazy; Malibu Babie; Vaughn Oliver; Rocco Did It Again!; Stargate

Katy Perry chronology
| Smile (2020) | 143 (2024) | The Ones That Got the Plays (2026) |

Singles from 143
- 1. "Woman's World" Released: July 11, 2024; 2. "Lifetimes" Released: August 8, 2024; 3. "I'm His, He's Mine" Released: September 13, 2024

Singles from 1432
- 1. "OK" Released: December 20, 2024

143 is the seventh studio album by the American singer-songwriter Katy Perry. It was released on September 20, 2024, through Capitol Records. The album title represents the phrase "I love you", (Note: The representation is formed by a simple letter-count of each word in the phrase "I love you".) and is also Perry's symbolic "angel number". (Note: Not to be confused with the concept of angel numbers in numerology.) The album is a pop record with dance-pop and Europop elements. Aiming to create a "dance party" album, Perry worked with previous collaborators Max Martin, Dr. Luke, and Stargate, while also approaching first-time collaborators Vaughn Oliver and Rocco Did It Again! 143 features guest appearances from German singer Kim Petras and American rappers 21 Savage, Doechii and JID.

Three singles preceded the album's release: "Woman's World", released as the lead single on July 11, 2024, peaked at number 63 on the US Billboard Hot 100, number 47 on the UK Singles Chart, and number 65 on the Billboard Global 200, becoming Perry's second-highest-charting entry on the latter chart. It was followed by the single "Lifetimes" on August 8, and "I'm His, He's Mine" (featuring Doechii) on September 13. Commercially, the album reached the top five in Australia, Belgium (Wallonia), Scotland, and Spain, and the top 10 in Austria, Belgium (Flanders), Italy, New Zealand, the United States, and the United Kingdom.

143 received negative reviews from critics, who marked it as an all-time career low for Perry. Criticism was directed at the album's outdated production and lackluster songwriting, with several comparing it to AI-generated music. It became the worst-reviewed album of Perry's career and one of the lowest-rated albums on Metacritic. Dr. Luke's involvement in the album was widely panned due to sexual assault allegations by Kesha. A digital reissue entitled 1432 (meaning "I love you too") with four additional songs was released on December 20, 2024, including the track "OK", which was released as a single in Italy. To support the album, Perry embarked on the Lifetimes Tour between April and December 2025.

== Background and conception ==
In August 2020, Katy Perry released her sixth studio album, Smile. It received mixed reviews from critics and was dubbed by journalists as a commercial disappointment. In August 2023, Perry confirmed in a Good Morning America interview that she was working on new material from a "place of love". The next February, she made an appearance on Jimmy Kimmel Live! and announced her exit from the American Idol judges' panel following the conclusion of the twenty-second season, wanting to "go out and feel that pulse to my own beat" and release new music after being "in the studio for a while". Two months later, Perry told Access Hollywood that she was working on a "very bright and joyful" album.

Rolling Stone reported in June 2024 that Perry had "reconnected" with producers who worked with her before, including Max Martin, Stargate, and Dr. Luke. During a livestream via her social media on July 10, 2024, Perry described 143 as a dance album: "This record is super high energy, it's super summer, it's very high BPM. We just had a family dance party to one of the songs, and it's just full of so much joy, so much love, so much light." Perry also stated that an acoustic follow-up album was in the works after 143. 143 is a pop, dance-pop, and Europop album, addressing themes around love, motherhood and feminism.

During an exclusive interview with Zane Lowe, she explained that the album title is her symbolic "angel" number: "A couple years ago, we were going through a little bit of a hard time medically in our family, and it was a little bit scary, and I started seeing 143 in many different ways, not just, like, on the phone. It was just like trippy, almost. And I looked it up, and it's code for 'I love you.' I really believe it was my angels, my guides, saying, 'I love you. We got you. We're going to protect you. You're exactly where you're meant to be. You're on the path". (Note: 143 was a popular pager number to communicate "I love you" derived from the number of letters in each of the three words.)

== Release and promotion ==
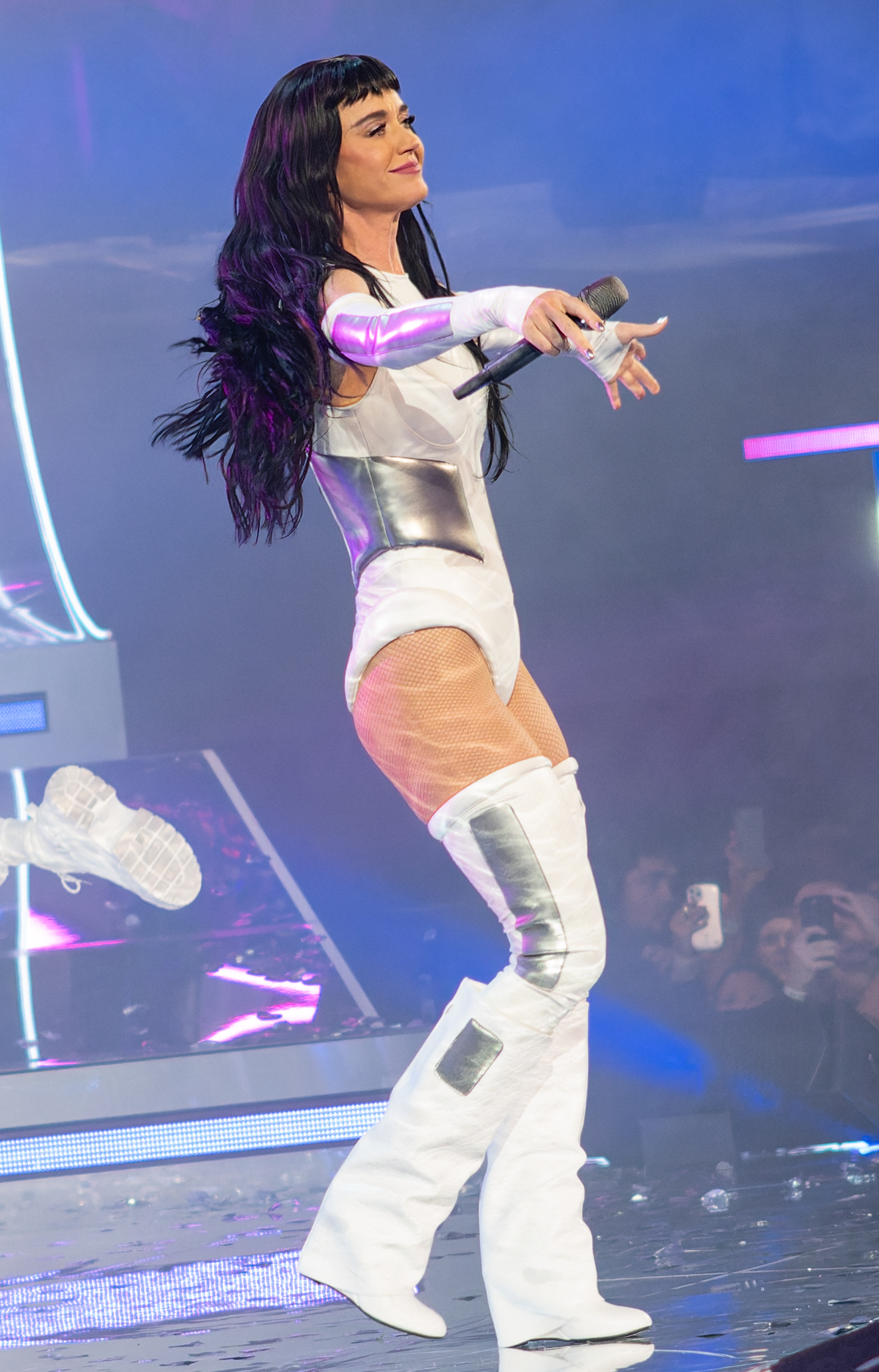
Perry performing at Methodist Central Hall, Westminster in 2024

Perry revealed on July 10, 2024, that her seventh album is titled 143 and will be released on September 20, 2024, by Capitol Records, aligned with her headlining live performance at the Rock in Rio Festival, in Brazil. To further excite her fans, she went on a social media livestream that day and teased new songs from the album, including "Nirvana", "Gimme Gimme" featuring 21 Savage, and "I'm His, He's Mine" featuring Doechii, which samples "Gypsy Woman" by Crystal Waters. During her interview with Lowe, Perry shared snippets of two other 143 tracks: "Lifetimes" and "Gorgeous". The album was available as eight vinyl variants, four CD variants, a cassette tape, and multiple digital download variants with exclusive bonus tracks. Perry conducted a one-off concert, Katy Perry: Night of a Lifetime, on December 11 at the Methodist Central Hall, Westminster in London. The special was recorded and aired on December 21 at ITV1.

=== Singles ===
The lead single, "Woman's World", was released on July 11, 2024. The song and its music video were received negatively by critics and the audience. Several journalists attributed it to the "bad taste" of the album's marketing, which they found unhelpful to Perry's perceived commercial decline with Witness and Smile. Perry's collaboration with Dr. Luke, who has been accused of sexual harassment by American singer Kesha, was also widely criticized.

The album's second single, "Lifetimes", an Italo house track, was released on August 8, 2024. In its music video, the track list of 143 was revealed. The music video was met with some controversy after Perry was accused of trespassing on ecologically protected dunes by the government of Balearic Islands, Spain, a claim which Perry's record label, Capitol, refuted.

Perry performed "I'm His, He's Mine" with Doechii and "Lifetimes" in a medley at the 2024 MTV Video Music Awards on September 11, with "I'm His, He's Mine" being released as a single two days later on September 13. On the album's release day, Perry performed "Woman's World", "Gimme Gimme", "Gorgeous", "I'm His, He's Mine" and "Lifetimes" at Rock in Rio. Perry performed "Gorgeous" and "Lifetimes" at the 2024 AFL Grand Final on September 28. "OK" was serviced to radio on December 20, 2024, as the album's fourth single in Italy. Both "Lifetimes" and "I'm His, He's Mine" generally charted lower on mainstream charts, instead achieving greater success on airplay charts, reaching the top-forty in multiple countries. "I'm His, He's Mine" became the second single from the album to reach the top-thirty on the Billboard Pop Airplay Chart, after "Woman's World".

== Critical reception ==
Professional ratings
Aggregate scores
| Source | Rating |
|---|---|
| AnyDecentMusic? | 3.7/10 |
| Metacritic | 37/100 |
Review scores
| Source | Rating |
| AllMusic | 1.5/5 stars |
| Clash | 5/10 |
| The Daily Telegraph | 1/5 stars |
| Exclaim! | 3/10 |
| The Guardian | 2/5 stars |
| The Independent | 2/5 stars |
| The Line of Best Fit | 2/10 |
| NME | 2/5 stars |
| Pitchfork | 4.5/10 |
| Rolling Stone | 1.5/5 stars |

143 was met with negative reception from music critics, being dubbed Perry's worst effort. (Note: Multiple references:) At Metacritic, which assigns a weighted mean rating out of 100 to reviews from mainstream critics, the album received an average score of 37, based on 18 reviews, indicating "generally unfavorable reviews". It marks the lowest-rated album of Perry's career, the lowest-rated album of the 2020s, and the 19th lowest-rated album overall on the website.

Reviews considered 143 an unimpressive and derivative record. Alexis Petridis of The Guardian dubbed 143 a mediocre pop album "some way short of total catastrophe". The New Yorker critic Amanda Petrusich, Financial Times's Ludovic Hunter-Tilney, and PopMatters' Peter Piatkowski said that Perry has lost the frivolity and "cheeky, cartoonish eccentricity" that used to make her songs "dexterous and funny". Clash's Robin Murray, Slant's Tom Williams, The Times's Ed Potton, and NME's Nick Levine felt the album was a dull, unsatisfying listen with very few highlights. Tanatat Khuttapan of The Line of Best Fit dubbed 143 an album of "mindless club fillers" while The Daily Telegraph's Helen Brown referred to it as an inept, "disastrous" album. Slate's Carl Wilson, Business Insider's Callie Ahlgrim and The Arts Desk's Guy Oddy said the album has no redeeming songs after its three singles.

The outdated production was a recurring point of critique across multiple reviews. Petridis, Murray, and Los Angeles Times' Mikael Wood felt that Perry's music does not fit in a pop scene defined by the fresh sounds of newer artists, specifically those like Sabrina Carpenter and Chappell Roan. Multiple critics speculated if artificial intelligence was used in the process of making the album, due to the perceived lower artistic value and quality of the album.

Chris Kelly of The Washington Post, Maura Johnston of Rolling Stone, and Hunter-Tilney agreed that 143 is a failed attempt in rekindling Perry's prime, resulting in pop music that is "as dated as a Vine". Rich Juzwiak of Pitchfork noted the underperformance of 143 after the commercial failures of Witness (2017) and Smile (2020) and quipped that releasing albums that are so-bad-it's-good could be a part of Perry's appeal. Steven Horowitz from Variety described 143 as a new creative low for Perry, arguing that Perry's decision to reflect on her older catalog to create new music was a bad creative decision. Others felt that 143 confirms Perry's perceived loss of creativity after having been a prominent pop star of the 2010s, with The Spinoff's Stewart Sowman-Lund naming Prism (2013) as Perry's last success.

A more positive review came from Billboard author Rania Aniftos, who regarded 143 as a "characteristically Katy Perry" album that her fans are "sure to enjoy". Some reviewers, such as Horowitz, Petridis, and Khuttapan, declared "Wonder" the best track of the album, complimenting the display of sincere emotion. Hunter-Tilney remarked that "a so-bad-it's-good reassessment" is 143's last resort and pondered if the album could be "reborn as a kitsch classic for its sheer badness".

The album's critical reception was a topic of media coverage. Nick Levine of the BBC opined that the album's reception "may also have been hampered by a toxic combination of misogyny and ageism that tends to affect female artists over 35". However, Callie Ahlgrim countered this argument and said "the adverse reaction [to 143] is very much earned, if even a little generous".

== Commercial performance ==
In the United States, 143 debuted at number six on the Billboard 200 chart, marking Perry's seventh top-ten album, with 48,000 album-equivalent units. The album's first-week sales included 37,500 pure sales, 10,000 streaming-equivalent units (translated from 13.11 million on-demand streams) and 500 track-equivalent units. 143 remained on the Billboard 200 for two weeks. As of December 2024, the album has sold 100,000 copies in the US according to Luminate.

In Australia, 143 debuted at number two on the ARIA Albums Chart, becoming Perry's sixth top-five entry. The album's chart entry was aided by her performance at the 2024 AFL Grand Final. In Spain, Perry achieved her second-highest-charting album when 143 debuted at number three. In the United Kingdom, the record entered the UK Albums Chart at number six with 9,250 album-equivalent units, marking Perry's best first-week sales in the country since Witness (2017), and became her fifth top-10 album. Elsewhere, 143 reached the top five in Belgium (Wallonia) and Scotland, and the top 10 in Austria, Belgium (Flanders), Italy, and New Zealand.

== Track listing ==
Standard edition
| No. | Title | Writer(s) | Producer(s) | Length |
|---|---|---|---|---|
| 1. | "Woman's World" | Katy Perry; Łukasz Gottwald; Vaughn Oliver; Aaron Joseph; Rocco Valdes; Chloe Angelides | Dr. Luke; Oliver; Joseph; Rocco Did It Again! | 2:43 |
| 2. | "Gimme Gimme" (featuring 21 Savage) | Perry; Shéyaa Bin Abraham-Joseph; Gottwald; Valdes; Ryan Ogren; Theron Thomas; Gamal Lewis; Ferras Alqaisi | Dr. Luke; Rocco Did It Again! | 2:57 |
| 3. | "Gorgeous" (featuring Kim Petras) | Perry; Kim Petras; Gottwald; Max Martin; Oliver; Joseph; Valdes; Angelides; Malibu Babie; Devin Wilkes | Dr. Luke; Oliver; Malibu Babie | 3:17 |
| 4. | "I'm His, He's Mine" (featuring Doechii) | Perry; Jaylah Hickmon; Gottwald; Valdes; Ogren; Thomas; Lewis; Alqaisi; Crystal Waters; Neal Conway | Dr. Luke; Rocco Did It Again! | 3:18 |
| 5. | "Crush" | Perry; Gottwald; Valdes; Ogren; Thomas; Keegan Bach; Emily Warren; Scott Harris; Sarah Hudson; Dallas Koehlke | Dr. Luke | 2:57 |
| 6. | "Lifetimes" | Perry; Gottwald; Oliver; Valdes; Ogren; Thomas; Lewis; Hudson | Dr. Luke; Oliver | 3:12 |
| 7. | "All the Love" | Perry; Gottwald; Oliver; Joseph; Ogren; Bach; Alqaisi | Dr. Luke; Oliver; Joseph; KBeazy | 3:15 |
| 8. | "Nirvana" | Perry; Gottwald; Oliver; Joseph; Valdes; Ogren; Bach; Hudson; Koehlke; Thomas; Warren; Harris | Dr. Luke; Oliver; Joseph | 2:51 |
| 9. | "Artificial" (featuring JID) | Perry; JID; Gottwald; Joseph; Valdes; Bach; Angelides; Hudson; Samuel Catalano | Dr. Luke; KBeazy | 2:43 |
| 10. | "Truth" | Perry; Gottwald; Oliver; Valdes; Ogren; Lewis; Hudson | Dr. Luke; Oliver | 2:57 |
| 11. | "Wonder" | Perry; Alqaisi; Tor Hermansen; Mikkel Eriksen; Henry Walter; Kent Sundberg; Cato Sundberg | Stargate; Cirkut | 3:24 |
| Total length: | | | | 33:34 |

1432 edition
| No. | Title | Writer(s) | Producer(s) | Length |
|---|---|---|---|---|
| 12. | "I Woke Up" | Perry; Gottwald; Oliver; Valdes; Ogren; Thomas; Lewis; Hudson | Dr. Luke; Oliver | 2:28 |
| 13. | "Has a Heart" | Perry; Gottwald; Oliver; Valdes; Ogren; Lewis | Dr. Luke; Oliver | 2:49 |
| 14. | "No Tears for New Year's" | Perry; Gottwald; Valdes; Ogren; Thomas; Alqaisi | Dr. Luke | 3:23 |
| 15. | "OK" | Perry; Gottwald; Oliver; Joseph; Angelides; Ogren; Alqaisi; Lusamba Vanessa Kalala | Dr. Luke; Oliver | 2:38 |
| Total length: | | | | 44:55 |

=== Notes ===
- "I'm His, He's Mine" contains samples from "Gypsy Woman", written by Neal Conway and Crystal Waters.
- "Crush" contains elements from "My Heart Goes Boom (La Di Da Da)", written by Barbara Alcindor, Thorsten Dreyer, and Karsten Dreyer.

== Personnel ==
Credits adapted from the 1432 edition track listing.

=== Musicians ===
- Katy Perry – vocals
- Łukasz Gottwald – background vocals (tracks 1, 2, 12–14)
- Chloe Angelides – background vocals (tracks 1, 3, 6, 8, 9, 13)
- 21 Savage – vocals (track 2)
- Kim Petras – vocals (track 3)
- Doechii – vocals (track 4)
- JID – vocals (track 9)
- KBeazy – background vocals (track 9)
- Leah Gjerde Drabløs – background vocals (track 11)
- Tius Luka Sundberg – background vocals (track 11)
- Knut-Ingolf Brenna – guitars (track 11)
- Cirkut – programming, synthesizers (track 11)
- Stargate – programming, synthesizers (track 11)
- Kent Sundberg – choir programming (track 11)
- Cato Sundberg – synthesizer programming (track 11)
- Thomas Andersson Drabløs – additional synthesizers (track 11)
- Kalani Thompson – background vocals (tracks 12, 13)
- Rocco Valdes – background vocals (tracks 12, 13)
- Ryan Ogren – background vocals (track 12)
- Daisy Dove Bloom – additional vocals (track 13)

=== Technical ===
- Dale Becker – mastering
- Serban Ghenea – mixing
- Kalani Thompson – engineering, vocal production (tracks 1–10, 13–15)
- Tyler Sheppard – engineering (tracks 1–10, 13–15)
- Clint Gibbs – engineering, audio consultation (tracks 1–10, 13–15)
- Stargate – engineering, vocal editing (track 11)
- Cirkut – engineering, vocal editing (track 11)
- John Hanes – immersive mix engineering
- Ryan Ogren – vocal production (tracks 1–10, 13–15)
- Katie Harvey – mastering assistance
- Noah McCorkle – mastering assistance
- Bryce Bordone – mixing assistance
- Grant Horton – engineering assistance (tracks 1–10, 13–15)
- Rachel Findlen – engineering assistance (tracks 1–10, 13–15)

=== Visuals ===
- Jack Bridgland – photography, creative direction
- OTM – creative direction
- Tal Midyan – creative direction
- Chris Albo – creative direction

== Charts ==
Chart performance for 143
| Chart (2024) | Peak position |
|---|---|
| Australian Albums (ARIA) | 2 |
| Austrian Albums (Ö3 Austria) | 8 |
| Belgian Albums (Ultratop Flanders) | 6 |
| Belgian Albums (Ultratop Wallonia) | 5 |
| Canadian Albums (Billboard) | 42 |
| Croatian International Albums (HDU) | 7 |
| Dutch Albums (Album Top 100) | 13 |
| French Albums (SNEP) | 14 |
| German Albums (Offizielle Top 100) | 16 |
| Greek Albums (IFPI Greece) | 62 |
| Irish Albums (Official Charts) | 20 |
| Italian Albums (FIMI) | 6 |
| Japanese Digital Albums (Oricon) | 29 |
| Japanese Hot Albums (Billboard Japan) | 74 |
| Japanese Western Albums (Oricon) | 21 |
| New Zealand Albums (RMNZ) | 9 |
| Polish Albums (ZPAV) | 15 |
| Portuguese Albums (AFP) | 20 |
| Scottish Albums (Official Charts) | 4 |
| Spanish Albums (Promusicae) | 3 |
| Swedish Physical Albums (Sverigetopplistan) | 18 |
| Swiss Albums (Schweizer Hitparade) | 12 |
| UK Albums (Official Charts) | 6 |
| US Billboard 200 | 6 |

== Release history ==
Release dates and formats for 143
| Region | Date | Format(s) | Edition | Label | Ref. |
|---|---|---|---|---|---|
| Various | September 20, 2024 | Cassette; CD; digital download; streaming; vinyl | Standard | Capitol | |
| Various | September 20, 2024 | CD; vinyl | HMV/Target | Capitol | |
| United States; Australia | September 23, 2024 | Digital download | 143: I Love You More | Capitol | |
| Japan | September 25, 2024 | CD | Japan | Universal Music Japan | |
| United States | September 26, 2024 | Digital download | 143: I Love You IRL | Capitol | |
| Various | December 20, 2024 | Digital download; streaming | 1432 | Capitol | |
