= S'Espalmador =

Island in Spain

- Location in Spain

Geography
- Coordinates: 38.787°N 1.426°E
- Archipelago: Balearic Islands

Administration
- Spain

S'Espalmador (Balearic Catalan: [səspəlməˈðo]; Spanish: Espalmador [espalmaˈðoɾ]) is a small, privately owned uninhabited Spanish island located in the Balearic Islands in the Mediterranean Sea.

== Features ==
Map of S'Espalmador and adjacent islets

The island is just to the north of Formentera, from which it is separated by a shallow sandbar. During low tide, it is possible to wade between the two islands. The area is visited by canoeists and yachts heading between Ibiza and Formentera. The island has pristine beaches, freshwater springs and a mud-bath.

To the north of the main island is Illa des Porcs (Pig Island) which was once used as a hideout and stronghold for pig smugglers. The En Pou lighthouse was built on the island in 1861 to mark the southern side of the Es Freus strait between the island and Ibiza.

The island had been owned by the Cinnamond family who bought it for the equivalent of €252 in 1932. In March 2018, despite the Formentera government's efforts to buy it, Catalan architect Norman Cinnamond and his sister Rosy sold the island to two wealthy Belgian businessmen, brothers Christian and Jean Cigrang for £16 million (~€18 million).

== Conservation issues ==
In August 2024, Spanish authorities launched an investigation on possible environmental crimes after reports surfaced that filming for the music video of the Katy Perry single "Lifetimes" had been held in the island's ecologically sensitive sand dunes without proper authorisation from the environment department of the Balearic Islands.

== Gallery ==
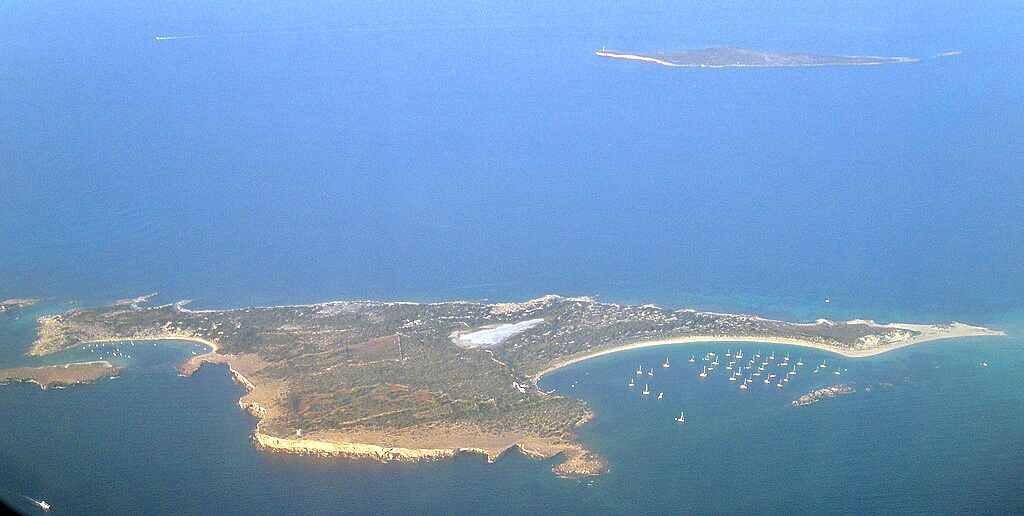
S'Espalmador is located just north of Formentera

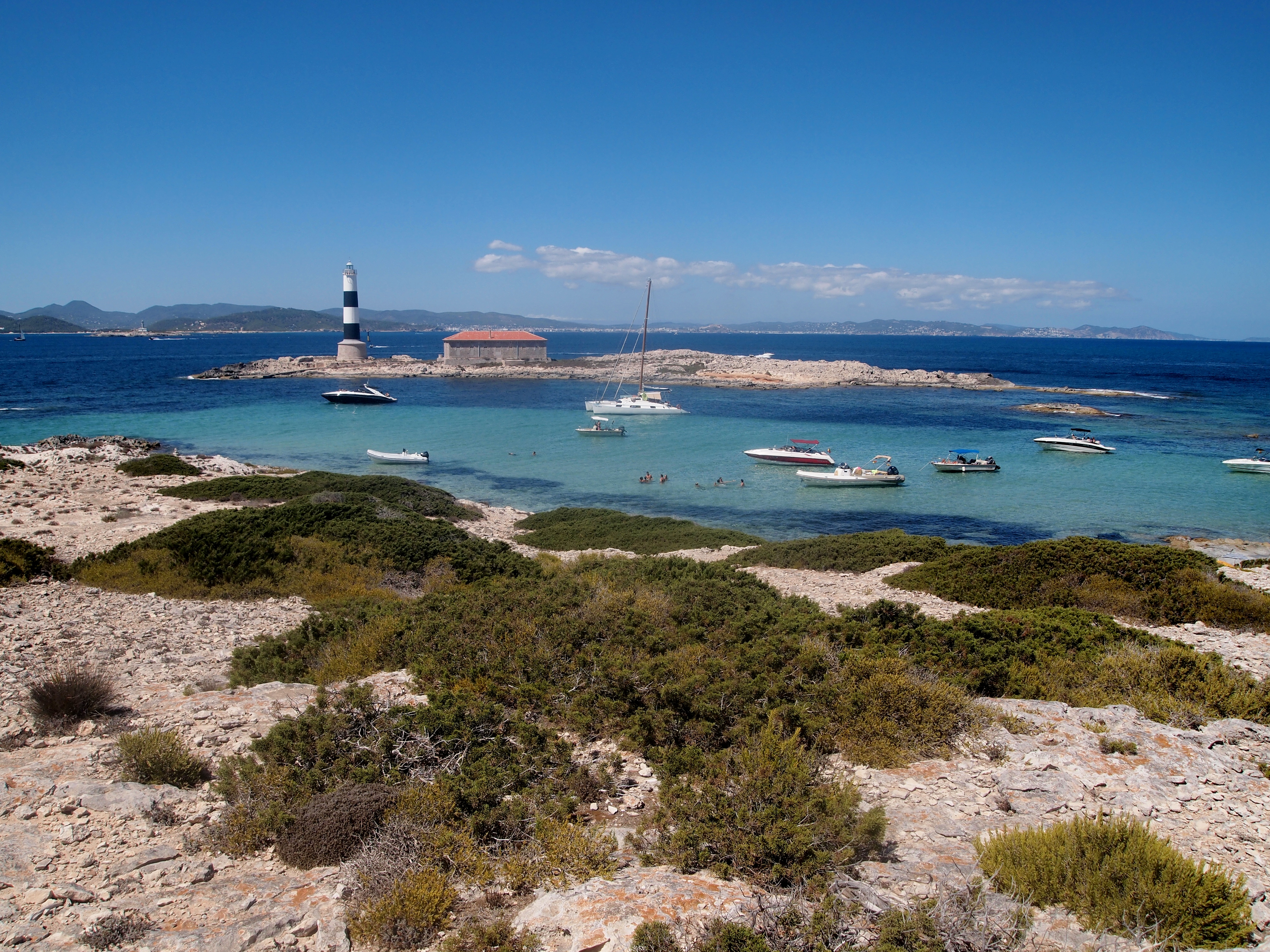
En Pou lighthouse, Illa des Porcs
