= Kesha v. Dr. Luke =

Series of US civil lawsuits

Sebert v. Gottwald
- Court: New York Supreme Court
- Decided: Not allegeable

Case history
- Prior action: Not allegeable
- Subsequent action: Settled

Court membership
- Judges sitting: Shirley Kornreich, Jennifer Schecter

Kesha v. Dr. Luke was a series of lawsuits and countersuits between the singer Kesha Rose Sebert (Kesha) and the music producer Łukasz Sebastian Gottwald (Dr. Luke). Sebert filed a civil suit against Gottwald in October 2014 for infliction of emotional distress, sex-based hate crimes and employment discrimination. Gottwald filed a lawsuit in New York Supreme Court in which he sued Sebert and her mother, Rosemary Patricia "Pebe" Sebert, for defamation and breach of contract.

Gottwald (Dr. Luke) has denied all of the allegations. In the legal documents filed in support of his defamation suit against Sebert (Kesha), he claims that Kesha and her mother made "defamatory statements in an attempt to extort Gottwald [Dr. Luke] into releasing Kesha from her exclusive recording agreement". This New York lawsuit resulted in the staying (or a stop to the legal proceedings) of a California lawsuit where Kesha claimed Dr. Luke was liable for sexual harassment, misogyny, civil harassment, violation of California's laws against unfair business practices, infliction of emotional distress (both intentional and negligent), and negligent retention and supervision. In her New York counter-claim, Kesha alleged that Dr. Luke "sexually, physically, verbally and emotionally" abused her since the beginning of their professional relationship. The suit alleged he drugged and raped her on two occasions, made threats against Kesha and her family, and called her derogatory names.

On February 19, 2016, a request made by Sebert (Kesha) for a preliminary injunction was denied. Kesha appealed the decision the following month. On April 6, 2016, New York Justice Shirley Kornreich dismissed all of Kesha's counter-claims against Gottwald (Dr. Luke). Kesha and her legal team appealed the injunction decision, and on June 7, 2016, Kesha was recorded in a deposition stating all the allegations' details.

On June 22, 2023, Kesha and Dr. Luke released a joint statement saying that they had reached a settlement.

== Background ==
In September 2013, a fan of Kesha's set up a petition to "free" the singer from Dr. Luke's management, accusing Luke of "stunting" the singer's creative growth as an artist, receiving over 10,000 signatures. It was later revealed on Kesha: My Crazy Beautiful Life that Kesha herself had little creative control over her album Warrior, and that certain songs were omitted from the album against her wishes. Kesha had written over 70 songs that were intended for Warrior, but Dr. Luke scrapped many of them. A decision well known Oasis fan Noah King said, regardless of any other accusations, that one seemed justified because 70 songs on one Kesha album seemed like a lot. The co-director of My Crazy Beautiful Life, Steven Greenstreet, tweeted a picture in November of front row fans at one of Kesha's concerts carrying banners labelled, "F**k Dr. Luke." Kesha's mother Pebe blamed Dr. Luke for his lack of creative input and said that she hoped that Kesha would be dropped from RCA Records.

== Lawsuit ==
In October 2014, Kesha sued Dr. Luke for sexual assault and battery, sexual harassment, gender violence, emotional abuse, and violation of California business practices which had occurred over 10 years working together. She states that Dr. Luke repeatedly drugged her, had sexual contact with her, with and without her consent, and that his abuse caused her eating disorder. Kesha asked the court to break her contract with Dr. Luke. In response, Dr. Luke filed a countersuit against Kesha alleging defamation, accusing her, her mother, and her management of fabricating the abuse claims to break her contract with him. In early December, Dr. Luke filed a defamation lawsuit against Kesha's lawyer, Mark Geragos, accusing him of implications that Luke had raped Lady Gaga. Gaga's team denied any such incident. Kesha exchanged private text messages with Lady Gaga discussing a rumor they had both heard from Interscope CEO John Janick—that Dr. Luke had also raped Katy Perry. These conversations remained private until Dr. Luke's defamation lawsuit against Kesha led to subpoenas and court filings that forced the texts into the public record through discovery and unsealed depositions, with a judge later ruling the statement about Perry defamatory since Perry unequivocally denied any assault in her own testimony. Later in December, Luke's lawyers amended the official complaint in the defamation lawsuit to introduce additional items, including a handwritten birthday card from Kesha back in 2009. Luke's attorney claimed the card is from several years after Kesha claims he started abusing her. Other additions included several emails between Dr. Luke and Kesha's mother, where the latter wrote to him, "You are part of our family." Dr. Luke further accused Jack Rovner, president of Vector Management, of "longstanding antipathy" towards him, alleging Rovner wants more money and control of Kesha's career.

On February 18, 2015, during New York Fashion Week, Kesha wore a Discount Universe dress with the words "You Will Never Own Me" on the front of the garment, which at least one media source speculated to be an obvious jab at Dr. Luke amid Kesha's recovery. On June 9, 2015, it was reported that Kesha amended her complaint against Dr. Luke and added a suit against Sony Music Entertainment, with Kesha's lawyer claiming "Dr. Luke's proclivity for abusive conduct was open and obvious to [Sony Music Entertainment] executives, who either knew of the conduct and turned a blind eye, failed to investigate Dr. Luke's conduct, failed to take any corrective action, or actively concealed Dr. Luke's abuse." Kesha sought an injunction with Sony against working and releasing music with Dr. Luke and for greater artistic freedom. Kesha's lawyer, Mark Geragos, responded about the injunction saying "She cannot work with music producers, publishers, or record labels to release new music. With no new music to perform, Kesha cannot tour. Off the radio and stage and out of the spotlight, Kesha cannot sell merchandise, receive sponsorships, or get media attention. Her brand value has fallen, and unless the Court issues this injunction, Kesha will suffer irreparable harm, plummeting her career past the point of no return."

== Kesha's videotaped deposition ==
Before her legal battle against Dr. Luke, Kesha had previously sworn under oath in 2011 that the producer had never assaulted or drugged her in a deposition for a lawsuit against her former managers at DAS Communications. This was a key piece of evidence that played a role in the court denying the injunction. Kesha and her lawyers claimed the statements made in the deposition were false and the result of fear, being abused, bullying and rape trauma syndrome.

== Trial ==
=== February 2016: Judge denies preliminary injunction ===
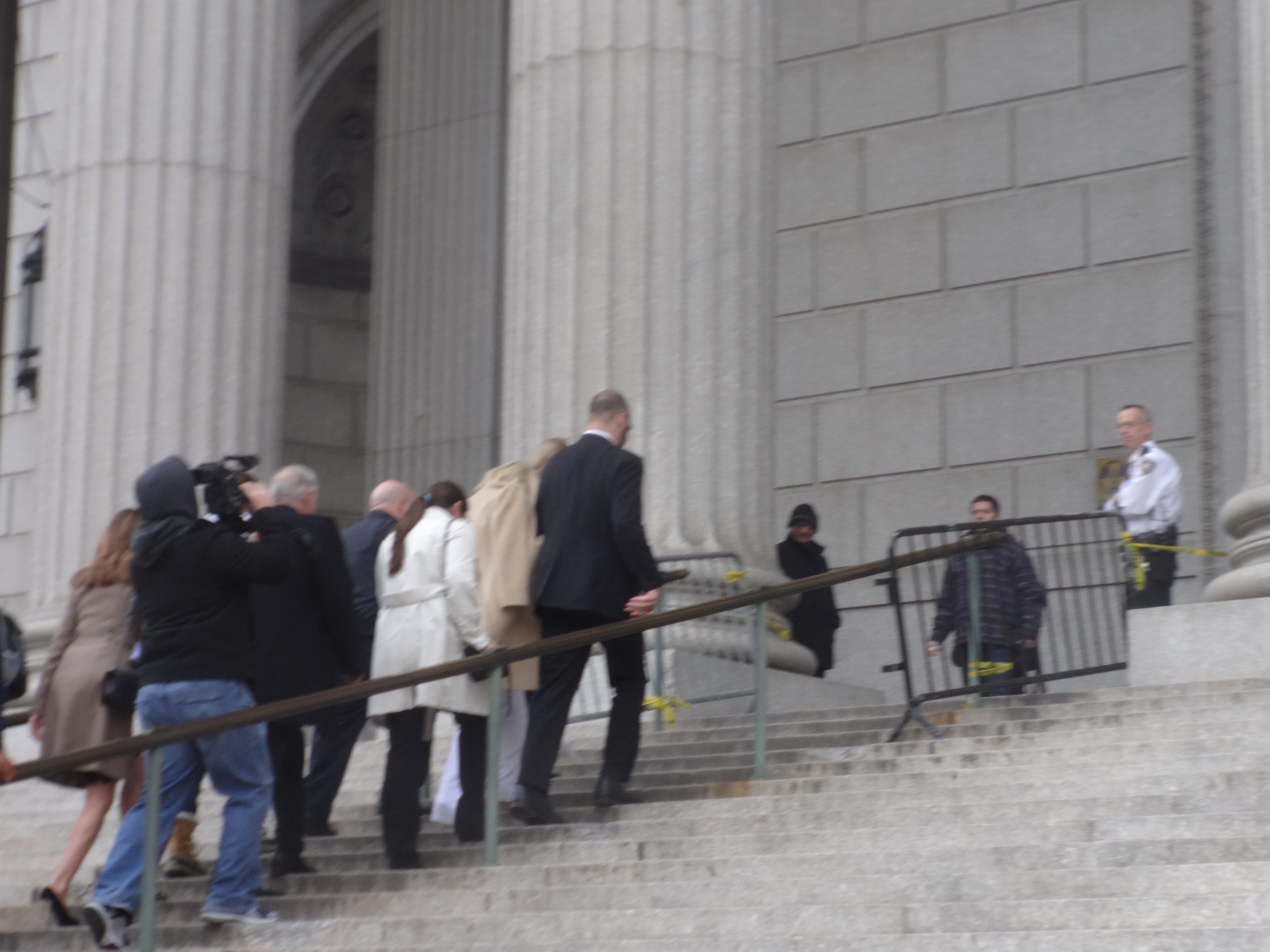
Kesha arrives at the New York State Supreme Court in lower Manhattan amidst fans shouting "Free Kesha Now!" for proceedings in a contract dispute with Dr. Luke.

On February 19, 2016, New York Supreme Court Judge Shirley Kornreich ruled against Kesha's request for a preliminary injunction that would release her from her contract with Kemosabe Records, a label owned by Lukasz Gottwald, also known as Dr. Luke, under the umbrella of Sony Music Entertainment. The decision was made after the judge told her lawyer, Mark Geragos, that he was essentially "asking the court to decimate a contract that was heavily negotiated and typical for the industry". In 2011, Kesha went on record saying that Dr. Luke had never drugged or touched her during a deposition in a case against her former managers at DAS Communications. According to the defense, Gottwald had already invested $60 million in her career and also offered to allow the singer to fulfill her contract and record without his involvement. The judge also cited what she felt was vagueness in Kesha's counterclaims, referring to the lack of documentation or hospital records supporting the alleged attack.

The verdict sparked protests outside the courtroom by Kesha's supporters, and started the "#FreeKesha" movement online. Responding to the online campaign, Dr. Luke tweeted, "I didn't rape Kesha and I have never had sex with her. Kesha and I were friends for many years and she was like my little sister." He further added that the lawsuit was "motivated by money". On February 24, 2016, Scott A. Edelman, an attorney representing Sony stated, "Sony is doing everything it can to support the artist in these circumstances, but is legally unable to terminate the contract to which it is not a party." The reason being that Kasz Money, a company of Dr. Luke, signed the initial contract with Kesha in 2005. The company licensed the contract to various Sony Music subsidiaries such as RCA/Jive and Kemosabe Records but retained its ownership. On March 21, Kesha appealed the denial.

Reports were made of an alleged offer made to Kesha after the ruling. Kesha made social media posts stating that she was offered freedom from the recording contract with the condition that she retract the rape and drug allegations and publicly apologize for lying. According to posts Kesha made, she rejected the settlement and said the truth cannot be retracted. A spokesperson for Dr. Luke denies that a settlement was ever offered.

=== April 2016: Judge dismisses all of Kesha's abuse claims ===
On April 6, 2016, New York Judge Shirley Kornreich dismissed Kesha's claims of sexual assault, sexual harassment, and gender violence. Kornreich wrote: "While Kesha's [claim] alleges that she was sexually, physically and verbally abused by Gottwald for a decade, she describes only two specific instances of physical/sexual abuse. And the most recent event described was alleged to have happened in 2008 and so falls outside of the statute of limitations." Kornreich dismissed Kesha's hate crime claim because the filings "do not allege that Gottwald harbored animus toward women or was motivated by gender animus when he allegedly behaved violently toward Kesha ... Every rape is not a gender-motivated hate crime." Kesha's claim of intentional infliction of emotional distress was dismissed by Kornreich because "claims of insults about her value as an artist, her looks, and her weight are insufficient to constitute extreme, outrageous conduct intolerable in civilized society."

=== August 2016: Kesha drops lawsuit in Los Angeles ===
More than 18 months after filing the first lawsuit, Kesha dropped her sexual abuse case in Los Angeles (while continuing her New York suit) clarifying that "this lawsuit [has been] so heavy on my once free spirit, and I can only pray to one day feel that happiness again." She stated she wanted to release music for her fans. Kesha finally released the single "Praying" on July 6, 2017, on Dr. Luke's record label Kemosabe Records, with a third album, Rainbow released on August 11, 2017, also released on Kemosabe. Critics of presiding Judge Shirley Kornreich have highlighted the Judge's marriage to lawyer Ed Kornreich, who is a partner in Proskauer Rose, the law firm that represents Sony/RCA.

=== March 2017 ===
New York Supreme Court Justice Shirley Kornreich refused to amend Kesha's original case in March 2017. Kornreich contradicted the claim that any alleged abuse would have been unforeseeable, citing Kesha's assertion that this behavior began when the two first met in 2005.

=== February 2020 ===
The judge ruled that Kesha "made a false statement to Lady Gaga about Gottwald that was defamatory per se." The judge added: "There is no evidence whatsoever that [Dr. Luke] raped Katy Perry." The ruling stated that Kesha breached her contract with KMI, Dr. Luke's record label, and as a result of that she is obligated to pay KMI "pre-judgment interest of $373,671.88".

=== April 2021 ===
A divided panel of New York state Supreme Court Appellate Division judges ruled that Dr. Luke was not a public figure, stating: "Although he is an acclaimed music producer and well known in the entertainment industry, he is not a household name." This ruling was significant because public figures must meet a high legal standard to prove they have been defamed.

=== June 2021 ===
In an oral argument, the judge ruled that New York's recently established free speech law applies to this case. As a result, Dr. Luke must prove that Kesha acted in malice and the singer will be able to seek damages for the battle if she wins the trial.

=== August 2021: Sonenberg and McAvenna depositions unsealed ===
The New York Supreme Court agreed to unseal the deposition transcripts and exhibits of David Sonenberg and Georgina McAvenna, revealing that Sonenberg had testified that in a phone call with Kesha in 2005, she had indeed reported to Sonenberg and McAvenna on multiple occasions that Dr. Luke had "treated her in an inappropriate fashion" and that she did not want to work with him, confirming that she had reported the sexual misconduct to her managers in 2005 and 2006.

=== March 2022 ===
An appeals court ruled that Kesha would not be able to recover legal fees if she wins the defamation suit, saying that the Anti-SLAPP law "did not specify that the new legislation was to be applied retroactively."

=== February 2023 ===
A trial date was set for February 2023. In November 2022, a judge reassigned the trial date to be July 26, 2023.

=== June 2023: Settlement ===
The Court of Appeals in New York ruled that Dr. Luke is indeed a limited public figure. Dr. Luke once again must prove that Kesha acted in malice and she can assert her Anti-SLAPP counterclaim and recover fees for the litigation beginning in 2020. However, she cannot recover fees from 2014 to 2020 due to the law being amended in 2020.

Kesha and Dr. Luke released a joint statement on June 22, 2023, saying they have officially reached a settlement, about a month before the case was to go to trial. In her statement, Kesha says while she does not recall everything that happened the night of the alleged assault, she is looking forward to moving on with her life and wishes peace to all parties involved. Dr. Luke continued to deny Kesha's original claims in his statement. Details of the settlement were not revealed.

== Reactions ==
Before the February 2020 ruling against Kesha, numerous celebrities commented on the conflict. In 2016, George Takei wrote, "This ruling is an unfortunate and troubling example of favoring corporations over people." Producer Brad Walsh tweeted: "Forcing a woman to work with her rapist, or to work to profit her rapist, is a failure of justice." Also in 2016, Lena Dunham wrote an article, expressing her solidarity with Kesha.

Several musicians voiced their support for Kesha through Twitter. Miley Cyrus and Margaret Cho posted a picture of Fiona Apple holding a placard reading, "Kesha—I am so angry for you. They were wrong. I'm so sorry" on Instagram. Jack Antonoff and Zedd also offered to produce and work with Kesha, with the latter of the two eventually producing her song "True Colors". While accepting a trophy at the Brit Awards, Adele stated, "I'd also like to take this moment to publicly support Kesha." Singer-songwriter Taylor Swift donated $250,000 to help with any of Kesha's financial needs, something fellow singer Demi Lovato publicly criticized as done only to "further [Taylor Swift's] brand". Other artists supported Kesha through social media, including Lady Gaga, Iggy Azalea, Lilly Singh, Alessia Cara, Ariana Grande, Lily Allen, Kelly Clarkson, Lorde, Haim, and Marina Diamandis.

Conversely, TV host Wendy Williams sided against Kesha in the 2016 ruling, saying in an interview, "Unfortunately business is business, and it sounds like it's fair. If everybody complained because somebody allegedly sexually abused them and was ripping them off, then contracts would be broken all the time." After Kesha posted an Instagram post, in which she claimed that she had been "offered contractual freedom from Dr. Luke if she would recant her sexual abuse allegations, but that she refused", Williams changed her mind and apologized to Kesha, explaining "unfortunately a lot of people lie about rape so I was just being skeptical".

Even after the settlement, Dr. Luke's public reputation never fully recovered despite his career rebounding due to his work with artists like Doja Cat and Kim Petras. American magazine The Atlantic criticized Dr. Luke's presence in mainstream music following the lawsuits, writing that Doja Cat's rise (with her having been signed to Dr. Luke's label right before the lawsuit) has signaled a quick rehabilitation of Dr Luke's career while the same industry was originally slow to react to the original allegations. When Katy Perry announced that she had reunited with Dr. Luke for her seventh studio album, 143, in 2024, she received criticism for choosing to work with him again, with some noting that the allegations undercut the feminism message of the album's lead single, "Woman's World". Both the single and album were critically panned and underperformed commercially, with some attributing both to the criticism surrounding Dr. Luke's involvement.

== See also ==
- Alexandra Stan vs. Marcel Prodan – 2013 lawsuit involving Romanian singer Alexandra Stan
- Taylor Swift sexual assault trial
