= Woman's World (Katy Perry song) =

2024 single by Katy Perry

Single by Katy Perry

from the album 143
- Released: July 11, 2024
- Studio: eightysevenfourteen studios (Los Angeles, California); Somewhere Studios (Santa Barbara, California)
- Genre: Bubblegum pop; dance-pop
- Length: 2:43
- Label: Capitol
- Songwriters: Katy Perry; Łukasz Gottwald; Vaughn Oliver; Aaron Joseph; Rocco Valdes; Chloe Angelides
- Producers: Dr. Luke; Oliver; Joseph; Rocco Did It Again!

Katy Perry singles chronology
"When I'm Gone" (2021)	"Woman's World" (2024)	"Lifetimes" (2024)

Music video
- "Woman's World" on YouTube

"Woman's World" (stylized in all caps) is a song by the American singer-songwriter Katy Perry from her seventh studio album, 143 (2024). It was released as the lead single by Capitol Records alongside an accompanying music video on July 11, 2024. "Woman's World" is a bubblegum pop and dance-pop track that Perry co-wrote with Chloe Angelides, Dr. Luke, Vaughn Oliver, Aaron Joseph, and Rocco Did It Again! (the last four of whom produced it as well).

Perry conceived of the song and its feminist message after feeling inspired by the "feminine divine", observing that the most successful songs of her career, such as "Firework" (2010) and "Roar" (2013), were "empowering" in their messaging. However, the song's announcement was met with mixed reactions from social media users, who criticized the involvement of Dr. Luke in the song due to singer Kesha's sexual assault allegations against him. Upon release, "Woman's World" was critically panned by music critics, who condemned the songwriting and production, and Dr. Luke's involvement.

Commercially, the single reached the top 10 in Croatia and Israel, the top 30 in Slovakia and Venezuela, number 47 in the United Kingdom, number 63 in the United States, and number 65 on the Billboard Global 200 chart. The music video, which featured Perry dressed like Rosie the Riveter, also received complaints, and was dubbed a weak attempt at a feminist message. She defended the video as slapstick and satirical in intent.

== Background ==
Perry co-wrote "Woman's World" with Chloe Angelides and producers Aaron Joseph, Dr. Luke, Rocco Did It Again!, and Vaughn Oliver. In an Apple Music 1 interview, she heard stories from listeners about how her empowerment anthems, such as "Roar" and "Firework", helped them get through tough situations. and how heavily Perry as an artist was connotated to those songs. "Woman's World" came about as a way to write another song in that category, but from the perspective of a mother with a connection to her "feminine divine".

== Release and promotion ==
Perry posted a fifteen-second teaser of her lip-syncing the song on various social media platforms on June 17, 2024. The artist also revealed the cover artwork featuring herself in metallic "alien-like" pants designed by Victor Clavelly with a white bikini top, photographed by Jack Brigdland. She also announced that the song would be released on July 11 and made it available for pre-order and pre-save via her website and various streaming services.

On June 25, Perry arrived at the Hôtel Ritz Paris in a black limo for Paris Fashion Week while wearing a red Balenciaga custom dress featuring two trains. According to Vogue, the outfit's second train was approximately one hundred yards long and showcased the song's lyrics in white lettering. The artist later partnered with Japanese electronics company Denon for a wireless earbuds commercial with a teaser of the song. The song served as the lead single from 143, Perry's seventh studio album. The song became available on CD and vinyl on July 12. Three days later, an extended play of the same name followed, containing the song and five remixes.

Dr. Luke's involvement in the song's production received some criticism; the singer Kesha has previously accused him of sexual, physical, and emotional abuse. Justin Curto, writing for Vulture, questioned: "Uh, are we lucky to be living in this woman's world?" Rania Aniftos of Billboard noted negative reactions to Dr. Luke's involvement in the song on social media.

== Content ==
"Woman's World", is a euphoric, synthesizer-heavy bubblegum dance-pop song.

== Critical reception ==
"Woman's World" was panned by critics and publications, who felt the song was "out of touch". Em Casalena of American Songwriter wondered if artificial intelligence had been used in the songwriting process upon hearing the teaser. Consequence critic Mary Siroky agreed and highlighted the irony of a female empowerment song with Dr. Luke involved. Alexa Camp of Slant Magazine criticized the lyrics as uninspired whilst Justin Curto of Vulture criticized the "vague feminist empowerment". William Hughes of The A.V. Club described the song's production as featuring "basic synth riffs".

Laura Snapes of The Guardian gave "Woman's World" one star out of five, lambasting it as "garbage". Shaad D'Souza of Pitchfork called the track "unfathomably tepid" and while deeming Dr. Luke's involvement in the song hypocritical. Alim Kheraj of Dazed felt "Woman's World" was reductive and creatively bankrupt. Cat Zhang of The Cut characterized the song and its social media rollout as pandering to the LGBTQ community. Variety included "Woman's World" on their Worst Songs of 2024 list, with Steven J. Horowitz calling it a "faux-feminist anthem about as tone-deaf as calling something 'purposeful pop.'"

== Music video and controversy ==
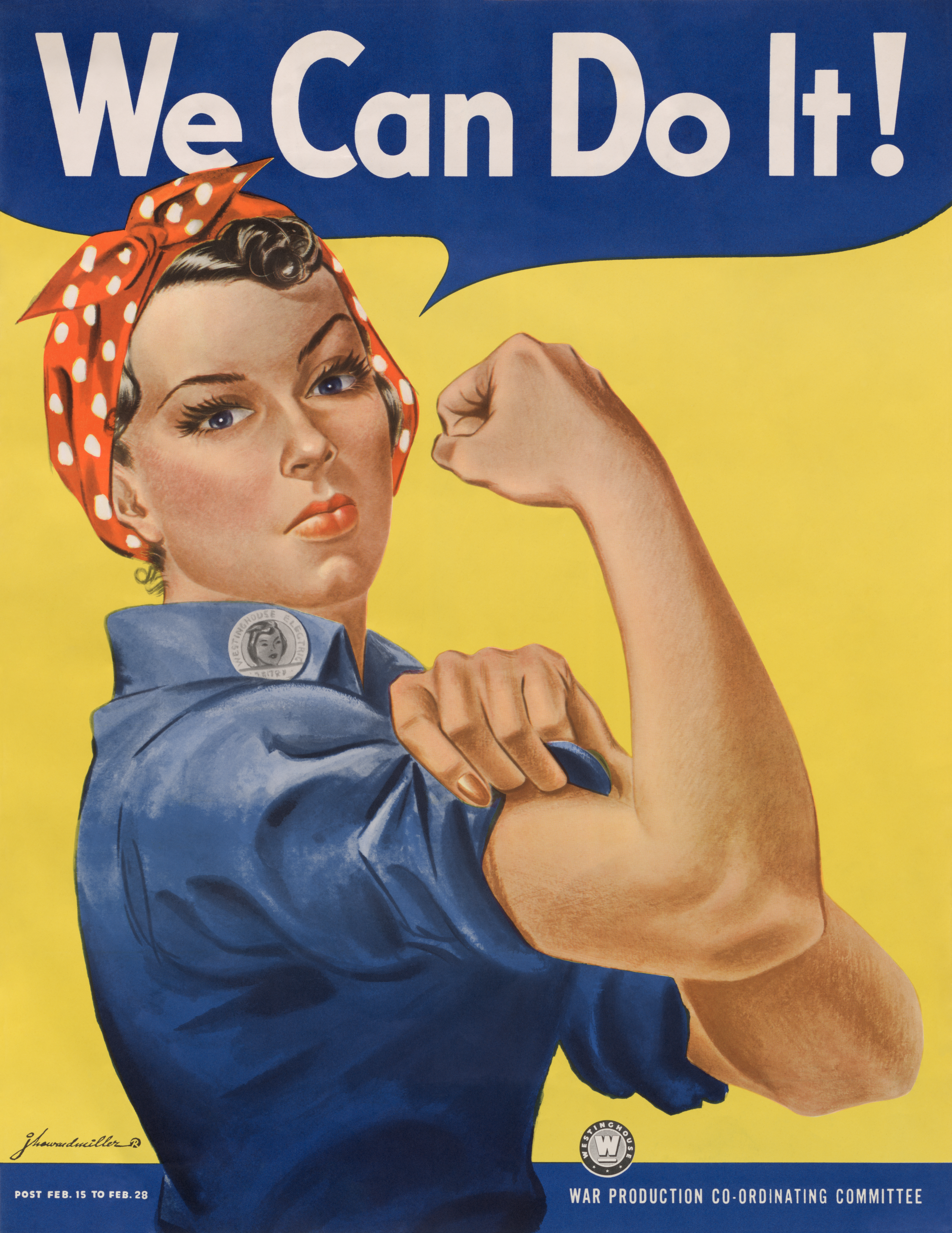
The "Woman's World" video references Rosie the Riveter.

The music video was directed by Charlotte Rutherford and released alongside the song. It features Perry singing the lyrics while dressed as a skimpy Rosie the Riveter using power tools and drinking whiskey before being crushed by a falling anvil. There is a quick, rapid montage of internet memes. After awakening in a white knit bikini and bionic legs, she goes off to explore new scenery, stopping once to fuel herself by putting a gas pump into her buttocks. Perry then joins media celebrity Trisha Paytas in a monster truck, and they ride it until crushing a car. Perry exits the truck to walk through a nearby house, smashing through a glass door in the back. She sees a young woman using a female gender symbol-shaped light for a TikTok dance, and takes it for herself. After being repeatedly asked "Who are you?", she screams "I'm Katy Perry!" while flying away on a helicopter. A censored "Modest Edit" of the video, which removed a scene depicting a gay couple kissing, was released in some countries.

The video received generally unfavorable reviews from journalists. Pareles felt that the "overblown video clip" was inferior to the song.

On July 13, Perry uploaded behind-the-scenes footage of the making of the video to social media with a caption reading "YOU CAN DO ANYTHING! EVEN SATIRE!" In the footage, she stated that her intention was for the video to be satirical, "very slapstick and very on the nose". Perry's explanation failed to convince music critics, who believed that the quick release of the behind-the-scenes footage showed that she had been anticipating an unfavorable response to the video.

== Live performances ==
Perry first sang the track live at the Evita event in West Hollywood on August 23, 2024. In September 2024, she also performed "Woman's World" at the Rock in Rio music festival in Rio de Janeiro, Brazil. On December 8, 2024, she performed the song at 2024 Jingle Bell Ball.

== Track listing ==
7-inch vinyl and CD

1. "Woman's World" – 2:43
2. "Woman's World" (instrumental) – 2:43

Digital download and streaming – EP

1. "Woman's World" – 2:43
2. "Woman's World" (BRB Woman version) – 2:43
3. "Woman's World" (Doing the Most Woman version) – 3:51
4. "Woman's World" (Transcendental Woman version) – 3:18
5. "Woman's World" (Super Woman version) – 2:17
6. "Woman's World" (Naked Woman version) – 2:43

== Chart performance ==
"Woman's World" debuted and peaked at number 63 on the US Billboard Hot 100, dropping entirely off the chart the following week. Other charts saw a similarly low performance of the song in the same tracking week: number 47 on the UK Singles Chart, number 65 on the Global 200, number 110 on the US Spotify chart and number 58 for the streaming service's global chart. Multiple journalists declared the song a failed comeback for Perry, attributing the poor performance to Dr. Lukas being a producer and the controversial, "heavy-handed" music video.

=== Weekly charts ===
Weekly chart performance
Chart (2024–2025)	Peak position
Argentina Airplay (Monitor Latino)	9
Australia (ARIA)	143
Austria Airplay (MusicTrace)	13
Belgium (Ultratop 50 Flanders)	35
Bolivia Airplay (Monitor Latino)	14
Brazil (Billboard Brasil)	114
Canada Hot 100 (Billboard)	77
Canada CHR/Top 40 (Billboard)	36
Canada Hot AC (Billboard)	30
Chile Airplay (Monitor Latino)	10
Colombia Anglo Airplay (Monitor Latino)	14
CIS Airplay (TopHit)	123
Costa Rica Anglo Airplay (Monitor Latino)	7
Croatia International Airplay (Top lista)	5
Dominican Republic Anglo Airplay (Monitor Latino)	9
Ecuador Anglo Airplay (Monitor Latino)	3
El Salvador Airplay (Monitor Latino)	15
Estonia Airplay (TopHit)	22
Finland Airplay (Radiosoittolista)	38
France (SNEP)	163
Germany Airplay (MusicTrace)	4
Global 200 (Billboard)	65
Guatemala Airplay (Monitor Latino)	18
Honduras Anglo Airplay (Monitor Latino)	3
Ireland (IRMA)	65
Israel International Airplay (Media Forest)	8
Italy Airplay (EarOne)	23
Japan Hot Overseas (Billboard Japan)	2
Lithuania Airplay (TopHit)	32
Malta Airplay (Radiomonitor)	4
Mexico Anglo Airplay (Monitor Latino)	5
New Zealand Hot Singles (RMNZ)	6
Nicaragua Airplay (Monitor Latino)	11
Panama Anglo Airplay (Monitor Latino)	4
Paraguay Airplay (Monitor Latino)	8
Peru Anglo Airplay (Monitor Latino)	8
Poland (Polish Airplay Top 100)	60
Portugal (AFP)	199
Portugal Airplay (AFP)	10
Puerto Rico Anglo Airplay (Monitor Latino)	5
San Marino Airplay (SMRTV Top 50)	19
Slovakia Airplay (ČNS IFPI)	17
Slovenia Airplay (Radiomonitor)	10
South Korea BGM (Circle)	187
Switzerland Airplay (Schweizer Hitparade)	9
UK Singles (Official Charts)	47
Uruguay Anglo Airplay (Monitor Latino)	3
US Billboard Hot 100	63
US Adult Contemporary (Billboard)	24
US Adult Pop Airplay (Billboard)	17
US Pop Airplay (Billboard)	22
Venezuela (Record Report)	28

2026 weekly chart performance
Chart (2026)	Peak position
Bolivia Anglo Airplay (Monitor Latino)	4

=== Monthly charts ===
Monthly chart performance
Chart (2024)	Peak position
Estonia Airplay (TopHit)	33
Lithuania Airplay (TopHit)	62
Paraguay Airplay (SGP)	30
Slovakia (Rádio – Top 100)	18

=== Year-end charts ===
Year-end chart performance
Chart (2024)	Position
Italy International Airplay (EarOne)	54

Year-end chart performance
Chart (2025)	Position
Argentina Anglo Airplay (Monitor Latino)	28
Bolivia Airplay (Monitor Latino)	70
Dominican Republic Anglo Airplay (Monitor Latino)	61
Honduras Anglo Airplay (Monitor Latino)	79
Nicaragua Anglo Airplay (Monitor Latino)	57
Panama Airplay (Monitor Latino)	98
Paraguay Anglo Airplay (Monitor Latino)	100
Uruguay Airplay (Monitor Latino)	72

== Certifications ==
Certifications and sales
Region	Certification	Certified units/sales
Brazil (Pro-Música Brasil)	Platinum	40,000^{‡}
^{‡} Sales+streaming figures based on certification alone.

== Release history ==
Release dates and formats
Region	Date	Format(s)	Version(s)	Label	Ref.
Various	July 11, 2024	Digital download; streaming	Original	Capitol	
Various	July 12, 2024	7-inch vinyl; CD	Original; instrumental	Capitol	
Italy	July 12, 2024	Radio airplay	Original	Capitol	
Various	July 15, 2024	Digital download; streaming	Extended play	Capitol	
United States	July 15, 2024	Hot adult contemporary radio	Original	Capitol	
United States	July 16, 2024	Contemporary hit radio	Original	Capitol	
