= Wonder (Katy Perry song) =

2024 song by Katy Perry

Song by Katy Perry

from the album 143
- Length: 3:24
- Label: Capitol
- Songwriters: Katy Perry; Cato Sundberg; Kent Sundberg; Ferras Alqaisi; Tor Erik Hermansen; Mikkel S. Eriksen; Henry Russel Walter
- Producers: Stargate; Cirkut

"Wonder" is a song by American singer Katy Perry from her seventh studio album, 143 (2024). It features vocals from Norwegian singer Tius Luka, who sings the song's opening and closing lines. Upon release, "Wonder" was highlighted by some music critics as the standout from 143, who noted the contrast of the song's personal lyrics to the rest of the album.

On June 12, 2026, Perry performed "Wonder" at the 2026 FIFA World Cup US opening ceremony in Los Angeles, joined by Luka who sang his part in the song. A week following the performance, the song debuted at number 54 on the Norwegian singles chart.

== Production and composition ==
"Wonder" includes vocals from its co-writer Kent Sundberg's son, Tius Luka. Luka recorded the song's intro and outro in 2021, at age five, while on vacation with his father in Western Norway. Sundberg later sent the recording to the songwriting and production duo Stargate, who liked the idea of building a track around it. Perry heard the recording in 2023 and was then inspired by Luka to record the full song. The song's chorus also contains background vocals sung Sundberg's daughter, who was 16 years old at the time. "Wonder" runs for 3 minutes and 24 seconds. It serves as the final track on Perry's seventh studio album 143, which was released through Capitol Records.

== Live performance ==
On June 12, 2026, Perry performed "Wonder" at the 2026 FIFA World Cup US opening ceremony at the Los Angeles Stadium, joined by Luka who sang his part in the song. Perry had revealed to People magazine on June 8 that she would perform a song from "one of her records" that she had never sang live before, and that "It's very fitting for the ceremony". The performance was described by Charisma Madarang and Althea Legaspi of Rolling Stone as "heartfelt".

== Credits and personnel ==
Credits are adapted from Apple Music.

- Katy Perry – lead vocals, lyrics
- Tius Luka Sundberg – background vocals
- Leah Gjerde Drabløs – background vocals
- Stargate – synthesizer programming
- Cirkut – synthesizer programming
- Thomas Andersson Drabløs – synthesizer programming
- Cato Sundberg – synthesizer programming, lyrics
- Knut-Ingolf Brenna – guitar
- Kent Sundberg – lyrics, choir arranger
- Ferras Alqaisi – lyrics
- Tor Erik Hermansen – lyrics
- Mikkel S. Eriksens – lyrics
- Henry Russell Walter – lyrics

== Charts ==
Chart performance
Chart (2026)	Peak position
Norway (IFPI Norge)	54
