= Dr. Luke =

American musician (born 1973)

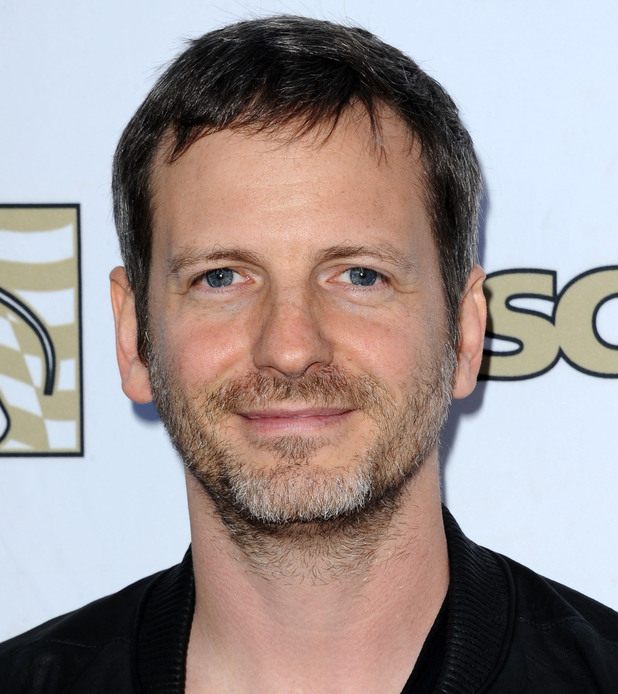
- Gottwald in 2014

Background information
- Also known as: Kasz; Richard Head; Made in China; Tyson Trax; Loctor Duke
- Born: Łukasz Sebastian Gottwald; September 26, 1973 (age 52); Providence, Rhode Island, US
- Origin: New York City, US
- Genres: Pop; hip hop; rock
- Occupations: Musician; songwriter; record producer
- Instrument: Guitar
- Years active: 1996–present
- Formerly of: Saturday Night Live Band

Łukasz Sebastian Gottwald (born September 26, 1973), known professionally as Dr. Luke, Tyson Trax, and Made in China, is an American musician, songwriter, and record producer. He began his professional music career as the Saturday Night Live Band's lead guitarist in 1996. In 2004 he produced Kelly Clarkson's single "Since U Been Gone" with Swedish record producer Max Martin, and later collaborated with Canadian producer Cirkut and fellow American producer Benny Blanco.

Gottwald continued to co-write and produce commercially successful songs such as "Who Knew" (2006) for Pink, "Girlfriend" (2007) for Avril Lavigne, and "I Kissed a Girl" (2008) for Katy Perry, before leaving Saturday Night Live and reuniting with Clarkson for "My Life Would Suck Without You" (2009). As the founder of both Kemosabe Records and Amigo Records, Gottwald has signed artists such as Kesha, Doja Cat, Becky G, Juicy J, R. City, and Lil Bibby to the former, as well as Kim Petras and Joy Oladokun to the latter.

In 2014, Gottwald was involved in a series of lawsuits with Kesha, in which she alleged abuse and employment discrimination whilst he claimed breach of contract and defamation. The case was settled out of court in June 2023.

Gottwald owns two publishing companies, Kasz Money Publishing, for his own songs, and Prescription Songs, which employs other songwriters. As of January 2011, he has garnered 21 Top 40 Billboard Hot 100 singles, becoming the producer with the third most such hits since the charts were created. Billboard named him one of the top performing producers of the 2000s, and the American Society of Composers, Authors and Publishers named him Producer and Songwriter of the Year from 2009 to 2011. At the 53rd Annual Grammy Awards, he was nominated for a Grammy Award for Producer of the Year, Non-Classical, and Perry's Teenage Dream was nominated for Album of the Year.

== Early life ==
Gottwald was born in Providence, Rhode Island. His father, Janusz Jerzy Gottwald, was an architect who was born in Łask, Poland. Growing up, Gottwald identified as Jewish and spent many of his formative years in New York City. He wanted to be a drummer, but his parents refused to allow a drum kit in the house. At 13, he picked up his older sister's guitar and taught himself to play. As a teenager, Gottwald would "listen to bad music over and over, if there was a guitar part [he] admired, so [he] could figure out what the guitar player was doing right."

== Career ==
Gottwald attended the Manhattan School of Music for two years. He was the lead guitarist in the Saturday Night Live Band from 1996 to 2007.

He produced tracks and remixes for various artists including Arrested Development and Nappy Roots. He released the 12" single "Wet Lapse", under the name Kasz, for Rawkus Records, and remixed the theme from the film Mortal Kombat. While deejaying at a house party, Gottwald met producer Max Martin and subsequently gave Martin a tour of New York clubs when Martin arrived in the city.

In 2004, he co-wrote and co-produced the Kelly Clarkson Billboard Hot 100 number two song, "Since U Been Gone" with Max Martin and provided the singer another hit in "Behind These Hazel Eyes". Subsequent songs by Pink, "Who Knew" and "U + Ur Hand" reached the top ten in the US. He would go on to co-produce a number one for Avril Lavigne with the song "Girlfriend" as well as seven other songs on Lavigne's album. He also achieved a UK number one with the 2007 song "About You Now" for the Sugababes. Gottwald contributed two songs to Katy Perry's second album, One of the Boys in 2008. US Billboard number one, "I Kissed a Girl" and "Hot n Cold", as well as three songs to Britney Spears' 2008 album, Circus, including the title track. He also co-produced the US number one song "Right Round" by Flo Rida. His third co-production for Kelly Clarkson, "My Life Would Suck Without You" reached the top of the Hot 100 as well. In late 2009, his song for Miley Cyrus, "Party in the U.S.A.", co-written by Jessie J, reached number two on the chart. In December 2009, Billboard named him as one of the top 10 producers of the decade.

In 2010, Gottwald was named Songwriter of the Year at the ASCAP Pop Music Awards and received 10 ASCAP Pop Music Awards for the year as the songwriter and publisher. He had received ten Pop Music Awards from ASCAP between 2006 and 2009. He was also named to Fast Company's 100 Most Creative People in Business, placing at number 33. Gottwald's co-production for Katy Perry's "California Gurls" debuted at number two on the Hot 100 and later reached number one. The second single "Teenage Dream" would follow suit. Taio Cruz's "Dynamite", co-produced by Gottwald, reached number one in the UK and number two in the US. He contributed to three more top ten songs, "Magic" for B.o.B, "My First Kiss" for 3OH!3, and "Take It Off" for Kesha, as well as a top five song, "Your Love Is My Drug", by the latter on the Hot 100.

In 2010, he was named both the Number One Hot 100 Songwriter of the Year and Number One Producer of the Year by Billboard. At the start of 2011, Advertising Age called Gottwald "the year's most successful producer and songwriter in terms of chart longevity."

In 2011 Gottwald co-executive produced Britney Spears' seventh studio album Femme Fatale alongside Max Martin.

On the week ending March 3, 2012, Gottwald's co-production for Katy Perry's "Part of Me" became the 20th song to debut atop the Billboard Hot 100. He also produced Perry's single "Wide Awake", which peaked at number 2 on the Billboard Hot 100, whilst topping the US Pop Songs chart.

In October 2014, Kesha filed a lawsuit against Gottwald, claiming sexual assault and battery, sexual harassment, gender violence, civil harassment, violation of California's laws against unfair business practices, infliction of emotional distress (both intentional and negligent), and negligent retention and supervision. Gottwald responded by filing a countersuit alleging that Kesha's lawsuit was an attempt by Kesha, her mother, and her new management firm to extort him into releasing her from her contract. In June 2023, one month before the case was scheduled for trial, Kesha and Gottwald released a joint statement saying the case had reached a settlement. Both parties wished each other well, although Gottwald still denied the allegations while Kesha continued to say she could not remember everything of that night.

After the lawsuit, Gottwald has maintained a low public profile. As of April 2017, he was no longer listed on the official Sony Music website and later that month it was announced that he was no longer the CEO of Kemosabe Records. That same year, Gottwald adopted the pseudonym Made in China. He has since produced songs for artists such as Trey Songz, Ne-Yo, and Big Boi. In 2017, Gottwald began songwriting and producing for German singer-songwriter Kim Petras. He also produced five songs on Doja Cat's second album Hot Pink (2019), including its number one single "Say So".

In 2021, Gottwald launched Amigo Records as an imprint of Republic Records. Its roster includes Petras, Big Boss Vette, and Joy Oladokun. The same year, he wrote and produced "Big Energy" by Latto which won Song of the Year at the 2022 BET Hip Hop Awards. In 2022, he produced the number one song "Super Freaky Girl" by Nicki Minaj. In 2023, he collaborated with Doja Cat and others. He won the ASCAP Pop Music Award for Songwriter of the Year in May.

== Lawsuit ==
Kesha v. Dr. Luke was a series of lawsuits and countersuits between the singer Kesha Rose Sebert (Kesha) and the music producer Łukasz Sebastian Gottwald (Dr. Luke). Sebert filed a civil suit against Gottwald in October 2014 for infliction of emotional distress, sex-based hate crimes and employment discrimination. Gottwald filed a lawsuit in New York Supreme Court in which he sued Sebert and her mother, Rosemary Patricia "Pebe" Sebert, for defamation and breach of contract.

Gottwald (Dr. Luke) has denied all of the allegations. In the legal documents filed in support of his defamation suit against Sebert (Kesha), he claims that Kesha and her mother made "defamatory statements in an attempt to extort Gottwald [Dr. Luke] into releasing Kesha from her exclusive recording agreement". This New York lawsuit resulted in the staying (or a stop to the legal proceedings) of a California lawsuit where Kesha claimed Dr. Luke was liable for sexual harassment, misogyny, civil harassment, violation of California's laws against unfair business practices, infliction of emotional distress (both intentional and negligent), and negligent retention and supervision. In her New York counter-claim, Kesha alleged that Dr. Luke "sexually, physically, verbally and emotionally" abused her since the beginning of their professional relationship. The suit alleged he drugged and raped her on two occasions, made threats against Kesha and her family, and called her derogatory names.

On February 19, 2016, a request made by Sebert (Kesha) for a preliminary injunction was denied. Kesha appealed the decision the following month. On April 6, 2016, New York Justice Shirley Kornreich dismissed all of Kesha's counter-claims against Gottwald (Dr. Luke). Kesha and her legal team appealed the injunction decision, and on June 7, 2016, Kesha was recorded in a deposition stating all the allegations' details.

On June 22, 2023, Kesha and Dr. Luke released a joint statement saying that they had reached a settlement.

== Awards and nominations ==
Awards and nominations
Awards	Year	Category	Nominated work	Result	Ref(s)
Grammy Award	2011	Producer of the Year, Non-Classical	Himself	Nominated	
Grammy Award	2011	Album of the Year	Teenage Dream	Nominated	
Grammy Award	2014	Producer of the Year, Non-Classical	Himself	Nominated	
Grammy Award	2014	Song of the Year	"Roar"	Nominated	
Grammy Award	2021	Record of the Year	"Say So"	Nominated	
Grammy Award	2022	Album of the Year	Planet Her (Deluxe)	Nominated	
Grammy Award	2022	Song of the Year	"Kiss Me More"	Nominated	
Grammy Award	2022	Best Rap Song	"Best Friend"	Nominated	
ASCAP Pop Music Awards	2010	Songwriter of the Year	Himself	Won	
ASCAP Pop Music Awards	2011	Songwriter of the Year	Himself	Won	
ASCAP Pop Music Awards	2023	Songwriter of the Year	Himself	Won	
iHeartRadio Music Awards	2021	Producer of the Year	Himself	Nominated	
