= Detwiler =

Detwiler, Detwiller or Dettwiler is a locational surname derived from the settlement of Dättwil, near Baden, in present-day northern Switzerland. The settlement was first recorded as Tetwiler in 924 AD and is described in early records as consisting of four farms or homesteads. The name has been associated with Tetra Villa (“four hamlets” or “four farms”), reflecting both the early form Tetwiler and the documented structure of the settlement.

- Andrea Detwiler, American costume designer
- Andy Detwiler (1969–2022), American farmer
- Chuck Detwiler (born 1947), American football player
- Cody Detwiler (born 1998), American YouTuber also known as WhistlinDiesel
- Dennis Detwiller (born 1972), Canadian tabletop game designer
- Jim Detwiler (born 1945), American football player
- Larry Detwiler, American television director
- Michele Detwiler (born 1976), American opera singer
- Monika Dettwiler (born 1948), Swiss-Italian journalist and author
- Noah Dettwiler (born 2005), Swiss Grand Prix motorcycle racer
- Ross Detwiler (born 1986), American baseball player

== See also ==
- Detweiler
- Deadwyler
