= Detweiler =

Detweiler or Dettweiler is a surname of German origin. Notable people with the surname include:

- Alan Detweiler (1926–2012), Canadian composer, writer, and patron of the arts
- Chip Detweiler (1932–1984) American architect
- Craig Detweiler (born 1964), American writer, filmmaker and cultural commentator
- Ducky Detweiler (1919–2013), former Major League Baseball player
- Frederick German Detweiler (1881–1960), American sociologist and expert on race relations
- Helen Dettweiler (1914–1990), American professional golfer
- Rene Dettweiler (born 1983), former German boxer
- Robert Detweiler (1930–2003), American competition rower, Olympic champion, naval officer, and scientist

== Fictional characters ==
- Theodore Jasper "T.J." Detweiller, one of the main protagonists in Recess
- Barry "Dutch" Detweiler, protagonist of Fedora
- Max Detweiler, character in The Sound of Music based on Franz Wasner

== See also ==
- Dettwiller in France, (in German) Dettweiler
- Deadwyler
- Detwiler
