= Melvin Bell =

US Coast Guard sailor (1920–2018)

Melvin Kealoha Bell Sr.
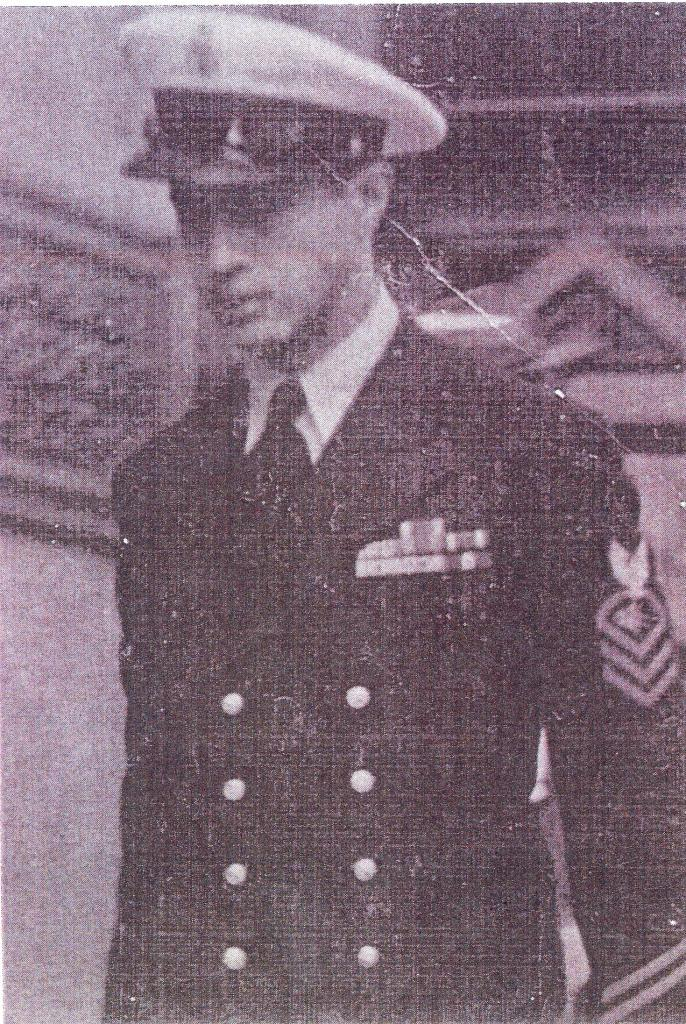
- Born: January 25, 1920; Hilo, Hawaii
- Died: September 9, 2018 (aged 98); Westminster, California
- Other names: Melvin Bell, Melvin Bell Sr.
- Occupations: sailor, electronics and radio expert
- Known for: namesake of a USCG cutter
- Children: 9

Melvin Kealoha Bell Sr. (1920–2018) was a sailor who served in the United States Coast Guard, and was the first Pacific Island sailor in the Coast Guard to be promoted to the rank of chief petty officer.

== Coast Guard service ==
Bell's father was an electronic technician with the telephone company, and his grandfather, who he lived with for several years while attending school, owned an electronics shop, and it was from them he first acquired an aptitude for electronics.

Bell worked for a few months as a mechanics assistant, but met United States Coast Guard sailors at the YMCA where he was living, and decided to enlist, in November 1938. At the time he enlisted, there was no recruiting office – so he enlisted on board USCGC Taney. The Territory of Hawaii was isolated so he was not sent to the continental United States for basic training.

In a 2014 interview, Bell described how he initially worked as a mess attendant. Prior to World War II the Coast Guard, Army and Navy were segregated, and non-white personnel were almost always assigned service roles, like mess attendant. In his interview, he described how he was able to make the extraordinary jump from mess attendant to skilled radio technician. Due to his familiarity with electronics, he was welcome to spend his off-duty hours in Taney's radio room. In May 1939 Taney's long range radio broke down, which severely restricted her operations.

Taney's radio had been down for close to a month, the District Communication's Officer, Henry Arnold had tried to assist the ship's senior radio operator in fixing it, without success. When they left, on Friday night, Bell asked the junior radio operator who was on duty if he could try fixing the radio. Bell had been watching closely, and he avoided duplicating anything the senior officers had already tried. He was thorough, and methodical. He ended up opening up the panel in the floor and methodically tracing and testing the leads coming to and leading away from the radio, and he found that an incoming relay had a short circuit. After he replaced the relay with a spare, and powered up the radio, he found he had fixed it. When he informed the radio operator on duty, he sent a signal to District HQ, informing them the ship was back online. Arnold, the District Communication Officer, was on duty, and asked who fixed the radio. When he was informed the radio he had tried and failed to fix had been fixed by a 19-year-old mess attendant, he took Bell under his wing.

Bell attributed his transfer to the electronics branch to Arnold's mentorship. Bell attributed his appointment as the radio operator of the small patrol boat USCGC Reliance to Arnold's mentorship. Arnold continued to mentor Bell for the duration of World War II.

When a large fleet of aircraft carrier-launched Japanese warplanes engaged in a sneak attack on US Navy forces at Pearl Harbor, Bell was the radio operator at the Coast Guard Station at nearby Diamond Head. He was the one who warned civilian vessels to steer clear of the attack.

Later in World War II, Bell learned Japanese and helped break Japanese codes. In 1943 he became the first Pacific Islander to be promoted to chief petty officer.

After the war, Bell became an electronics instructor for the Coast Guard. In 1958 when he was promoted to master chief petty officer, he was the first member of any minority to hold that rank.

When Bell retired after 20 years of active duty he started working for the Coast Guard as a civilian employee.

== US Navy career ==
After a long career with the Coast Guard, he began a long career as a civilian employee of the US Navy. During his career there he worked with both the Polaris and Trident ballistic missile programs.

== Legacy ==
When Bell retired from the US Navy in 2004, he was 84 years old and received an official recognition from President George W. Bush, honoring him for a long and distinguished career.

On July 26, 2019, Congressional Representative Luis Correa marked the 229th anniversary of the founding of the Coast Guard by addressing Congress, and noting the highlights of the careers of fourteen members of the Coast Guard, from minorities, whose accomplishments he felt merited more recognition. Bell was one of the heroes he recognized.

In 2010, Charles "Skip" W. Bowen, who was then the Coast Guard's most senior non-commissioned officer, proposed that all the cutters in the Sentinel class should be named after enlisted sailors in the Coast Guard, or one of its precursor services, who were recognized for their heroism. In 2019 the Coast Guard announced that Melvin Bell would be the namesake of the 55th cutter, USCGC Melvin Bell.
