= Diamond Head Lighthouse =

Lighthouse in Hawaii, United States

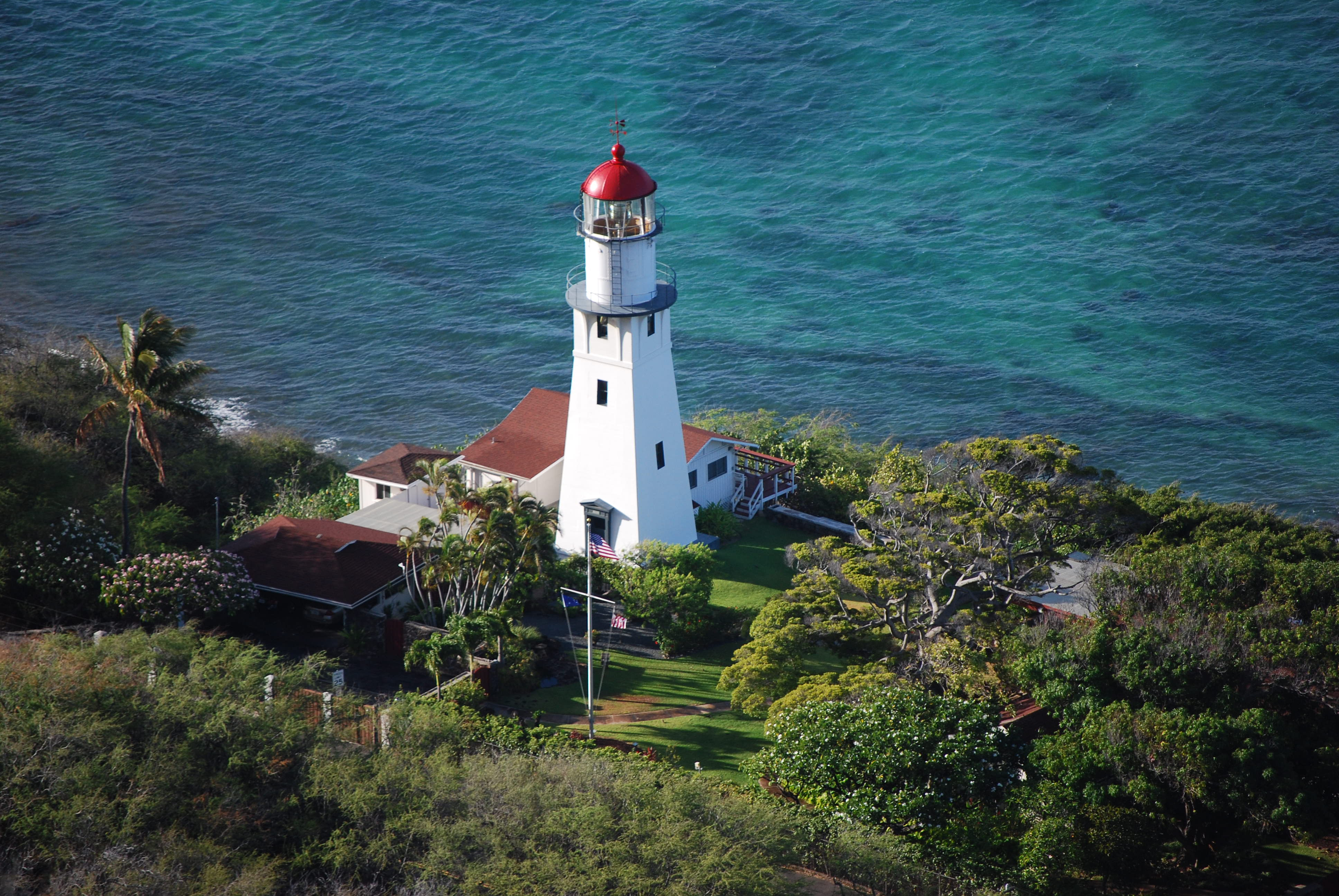
- Diamond Head Lighthouse
- Location: 3399 Diamond Head Rd. Honolulu, Hawaii
- Coordinates: 21°15′20.7″N 157°48′34.5″W

Tower
- Constructed: 1898 (first)
- Construction: concrete tower
- Height: 57 feet (17 m)
- Shape: square pyramidal tower with circular balcony and lantern
- Markings: white tower, red lantern dome
- Operator: United States Coast Guard
- Heritage: National Register of Historic Places listed place

Light
- First lit: 1917 (current)
- Focal height: 147 feet (45 m)
- Lens: Barbier et Bénard 3rd order Fresnel lens
- Range: white: 17 nautical miles (31 km; 20 mi) red: 14 nautical miles (26 km; 16 mi)
- Characteristic: Oc (2) WR 10s.
- U.S. Coast Guard Diamond Head Lighthouse
- U.S. National Register of Historic Places
- Location: 3399 Diamond Head Rd., Honolulu, Hawaii
- Coordinates: 21°15′25″N 157°48′34″W
- Built: 1917
- NRHP reference No.: 80001282
- Added to NRHP: October 31, 1980

Diamond Head Lighthouse is a United States Coast Guard facility located on Diamond Head in Honolulu, on the island of Oʻahu in the State of Hawaiʻi.

The lighthouse was listed on the National Register of Historic Places in 1980, and was featured on a United States postage stamp in June 2007.

== History ==
Originally constructed on a 40-foot (12 m) iron tower enclosed with coral rock walls, the lighthouse was first lit on July 1, 1899, with John M. Kaukaliu as the first keeper. The Lighthouse Board took control of the lighthouse in 1904. In 1917, the lantern room was moved to a temporary metal framework while a new 55-foot (17 m) reinforced concrete tower was built on the original foundation.

The adjacent residence was built in 1921 and lighthouse operations were automated in 1924. The superintendent of the 19th lighthouse district lived there until 1939, when the coast guard took control and built a radio station there during World War II.

In a 2014 interview, 94-year-old veteran Melvin Bell described serving as the radio operator at the Diamond Head station during the Japanese sneak attack on Pearl Harbor, and the steps he took to warn civilian vessels of the attack.

== Present ==
Since the war, the residence has become the private home for commanders of the coast guard's Oceania district (formerly the 14th district).

The lighthouse is featured in the 2021 music video for Katy Perry's song "Electric", which is a collaboration between Perry and Pokémon.

== See also ==
- List of lighthouses in Hawaii
