= Detweiler House =

Coordinates: 21.3093°N 157.8278°W

General information
- Architectural style: Tropical Modernism, Tropical Brutalist
- Location: Hawai'i
- Address: 2244 Round Top Drive
- Town or city: Honolulu
- Year(s) built: 1973
- Renovated: 2020
- Owner: Rick Kinsel

Design and construction
- Architect(s): Chip Detweiler
- Structural engineer: Richard M. Libbey
- Awards and prizes: AIA-Sunset Magazine Merit Award (1978), Historic Hawai'i Foundation.
- Designations: Hawai'i State Historic Register

Website
- www.detweilerhouse.org

Detweiler House is a Tropical Modern and Brutalist house in Honolulu, Hawaii. The house was built by Waialea Builders, with structural engineer Richard M. Libbey. It was designed by architect Walter Booser “Chip” Detweiler in 1973 to be his private residence.

== Design ==
Detweiler's work was influenced by Frank Lloyd Wright. Detweiler held to the architectural tenet of “truth to materials”, with his choice of palette, his unfinished treatment of construction materials such as concrete and rough-hewn lumber throughout the house, and his use of indigenous materials such as volcanic rock and redwood. The interior is minimalist and forgoes ornament. For example, there are no cornices, trims, or moldings.

Detweiler planned the building's design being conscious of air circulation in the tropical climate. Banks of clerestory windows with cantilevered glass run along the uphill (northeast oriented) side of the house and downhill (southwest oriented) facades of the house; other window-type openings have louvered wooden jalousie blinds. This system channels the Hawaiian trade winds through the house, cooling it naturally and eliminating the need for any mechanical system.

Detweiler lived in the house—first with his wife, Virginia (Ginny) Detweiler, and then later with his professional and life partner designer Dian Cleve until he died in 1984. A series of subsequent owners made alterations to the house, including sealing off window openings which thwarted the intended air circulation as designed by Detweiler, and adding giant floor-to-ceiling mirror panels to the interior.

== Restoration ==
In 2020, Vilcek Foundation President Rick Kinsel purchased Detweiler House, and worked with architects and artists to restore the house to Detweiler's intended vision using Detweiler's archive of drawings. In addition to removing the mirror panels and re-opening the sealed windows, Kinsel had both interior and exterior woodwork meticulously sanded back and refinished board by board, and the original electrical plan and furniture placement reinstated, as well as other projects that brought the house back the architect's original design and intention.

== Recognition and awards ==
Detweiler House won an American Institute of Architects-Sunset Magazine Merit Award in 1978. In 2022, after Kinsel's restoration, the house won a project award from the Historic Hawaii Foundation. In 2023, it was an Editor's Pick for the 2023 Architect's Newspaper Best of Design Award in residential restoration, and was also accepted for inclusion on the Hawaii State Historic Register.
