= Electric (Katy Perry song) =

2021 single by Katy Perry

Single by Katy Perry

from the album Pokémon 25: The Album
- Released: May 14, 2021
- Studio: Unsub Studios (Los Angeles); Secret Garden Studios (Santa Barbara)
- Genre: Electropop
- Length: 3:13
- Label: Capitol
- Songwriters: Katy Perry; Jonathan Bellion; Stefan Johnson; Jordan K. Johnson; Oliver Peterhof; Bruce Wiegner; Al Calderon; Rachel Kanner; Lucas Marx
- Producers: The Monsters & Strangerz; German; Wiegner

Katy Perry singles chronology
"Smile" (2020)	"Electric" (2021)	"When I'm Gone" (2021)

Pokémon 25 singles chronology
"Only Wanna Be with You" (2021)	"Electric" (2021)	"Take It Home" (2021)

Music video
- "Electric" on YouTube

"Electric" is a song by the American singer-songwriter Katy Perry from the Pokémon 25 soundtrack album (2021). It was released on May 14, 2021, by Capitol Records as the second single from the album. It is an electropop ballad written by Perry, Jon Bellion, Lucas Marx, Rachel Kanner, Al Calderon, and the producers Jordan Johnson, Oliver "German" Peterhof and Stefan Johnson of the Monsters & Strangerz and Bruce Wiegner.

Accompanying video was directed by Carlos López Estrada. In it, Perry and Pikachu assist younger versions of themselves. The younger version of Perry is played by Meili Aspen Caputo. Commercially, "Electric" charted in the low-tier positions of Billboard-published Canadian Hot 100 (number 97) and Global 200 (number 120). It entered digital component charts in the United States and Germany.

== Background and composition ==
On January 13, 2021, it was announced that the celebration of the 25th anniversary of Japanese media franchise Pokémon would commence with a musical collaboration with Perry. Describing herself as a "lifelong Pokémon fan", she stated that "In this moment of unknown, there are dependable places and characters and institutions and people, and I hope I can be one of them. That's what I hope for in my personal self, and even in my involvement with this collab." On May 10, 2021, the singer officially announced the single's title and release date through her social media accounts.

Perry later told MTV News that she was asked to write an empowerment anthem, and explained her philosophy regarding writing songs: "Some people write only heartache songs or sexy songs or a combination. And my lane seems to be the 'you can do it, ignite your light' empowerment. It's all within, you know? That's a message I love standing by." "Electric" was structured as an electropop ballad composed in the C major key. It talks about the joy that comes after achieving life goals with the help of friends. It was written by Perry, Jon Bellion, Lucas Marx, Oliver Peterhof, Rachel Kanner, Bruce Wiegner, Jordan Johnson and Stefan Johnson. It was produced by the Monsters & Strangerz, Wiegner and German. Perry's vocals spans from G_{3} to D_{5}.

== Release and promotion ==
"Electric" was released to digital download and streaming on May 14, 2021. It was released to Italian radios at the same day. The song serves as the second single of Pokémon 25: The Album after Post Malone's cover of "Only Wanna Be with You". A CD single was released on June 25. Additionally on the same page, pieces of merchandise inspired by the single are also sold. Additionally, "Electric" was included on the Netflix film soundtrack of He's All That (2021).

In the United States, "Electric" debuted at number 25 on Digital Song Sales chart. Elsewhere, it managed to peak at number 97 on Canadian Hot 100, 120 on Global 200 and 112 on Global 200 Excluding U.S. charts. In Latin American countries, the song charted within top 20 of Ecuador, El Salvador, Panama and Uruguay English charts. Jack White of Official Charts Company listed "Electric" as one of the songs responsible for driving 20% of CD single sales year-on-year, together with songs from artists such as Ed Sheeran, Olivia Rodrigo, Cardi B, and Coldplay among others.

== Reception ==
Halle Kiefer of Vulture said that it follows "in the well-trod footsteps of 'Roar' and 'Firework'", describing all three of them as "inspirational pop ballads". A staff review from Billboard wrote that the song "sees Perry return to anthemic pop." MTV News' Patrick Hosken called the song "belt-ready bop." In an article published by Universal Music Poland, the writer said the song "makes [the listener] immediately charged with the positive energy, in keeping with the song's title."

== Music video ==
=== Development and release ===
"Pikachu is the evolved form of Pichu, so in the video, you see the younger version of me with Pichu and myself in the present day with Pikachu. We both evolve, yet retain a sense of playfulness."

— Perry talking about the music video.

The music video was directed by Mexican-American filmmaker Carlos López Estrada, written by Estrada, Doug Klinger and Perry, with Klinger beinger executive producer, and Santiago Gonzales being director of photography. It was recorded on Hawaiian island Oahu in such locations as Diamond Head Lighthouse and Kualoa Ranch. United States Coast Guard approved shooting on the island. Perry told MTV News said that one of the ideas behind the music video was a "reminder of her trying to figure out who she wanted to be as a teenage artist performing under her given name, Katheryn Hudson." Singer also added that she chose Hawaii as clip's location because it "provided the perfect lush and naturalistic surroundings." Shooting took two 12-hour days.

Before the shooting, the production team was looking for a "girl with blonde hair and blue eyes that could play the guitar." Meili Aspen Caputo was finally cast to play the younger version of the singer in the video. The actress said that her mother received a phone call from the production team, and after a hair color change, Caputo played in the music video. During an interview with MidWeek magazine, the actress shared that being on the set was a "fun" experience. Perry also mentioned: "[Caputo] put her hair in pigtails and she looks identical to this one from that video I have of me playing."

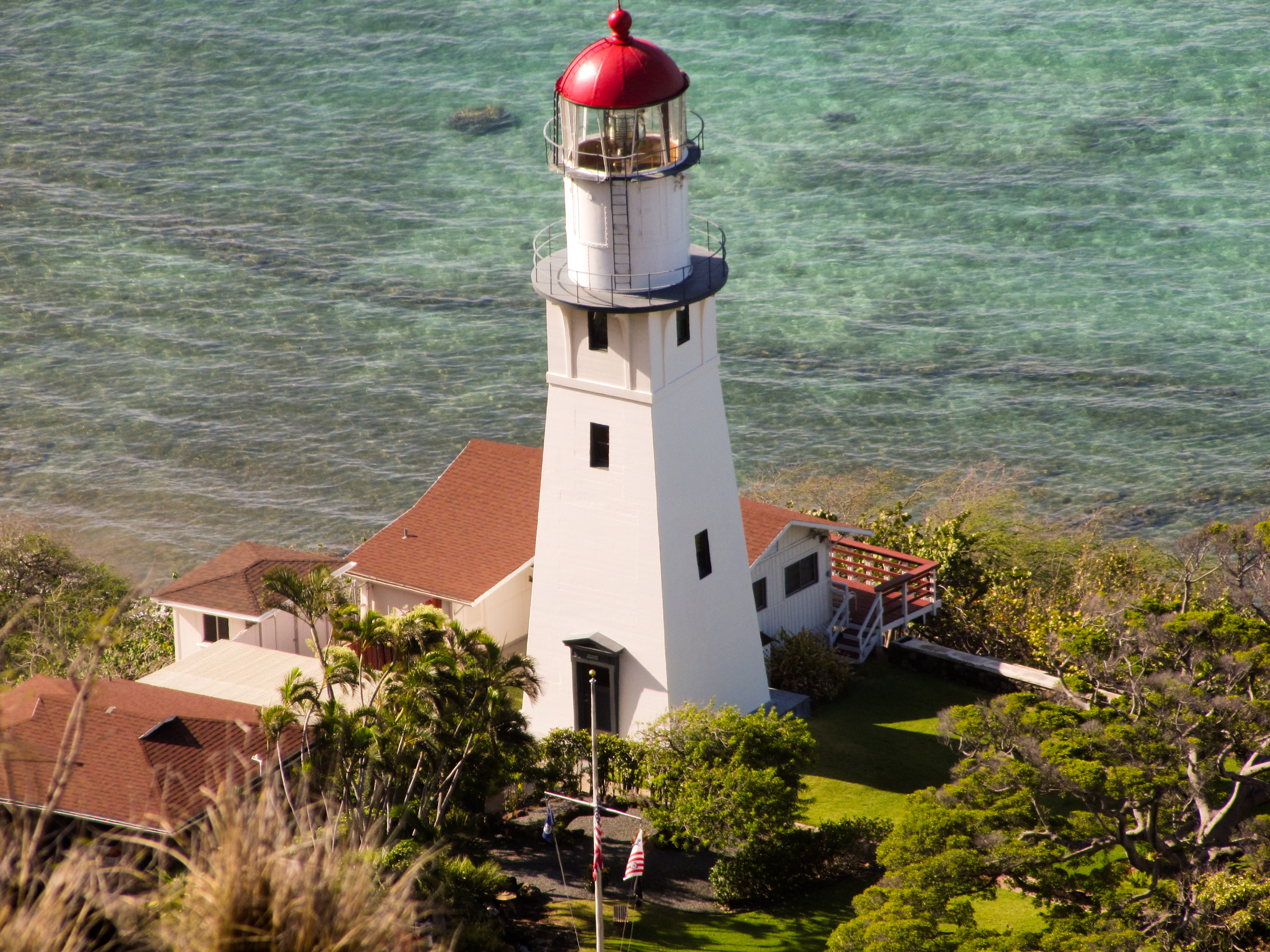
The music video starts off in Diamond Head Lighthouse (pictured).

Good Morning America shared a thirty-second sneak peek of the "Electric" music video on May 13, 2021, which premiered in full the following day. The behind-the-scenes video was published on Perry's official YouTube channel on June 7, 2021.

=== Synopsis and reception ===
The video starts with Perry and Pikachu hanging out in Hawaii. The two stop at Diamond Head Lighthouse and enjoy the view while in meditation. While they are meditating, they travel back in time. They encounter the younger versions of themselves, who are performing at the farmer's marketplace. The older version of Perry subtly manipulates the marketplace to help the younger version of herself find her style in music. Afterwards, she gets her younger version to join a talent competition being held at the island. By the end of the video, the younger version of Perry gives her first club performance as the older version of Perry and Pikachu looks on from the crowd until they wake up from their meditation.

Entertainment Weekly's Joey Nolfi and Pure Chart's Yohann Ruelle described the music video as "adorable." Halle Kiefer from Vulture stated that Pichu is the video's highlight. Patrick Hosken of MTV wrote that this song "needed a locale as large as its sound."

== Credits and personnel ==
=== Song credits ===
Credits adapted from Tidal and CD single.

Publishing and recording locations

- Published by When I'm Rich You'll Be My Bitch/WB Music Corp/Songs Of A Beautiful Mind/Art In The Fodder Music/BMG Chrysalis/Kobalt Music Copyrights SARL/1916 Publishing/BBMG Music/Kobalt Songs Music Publishing/BMG Platinum Songs/R8D Music/Songs of BBMG Publishing/Bruce Weigner publishing designee/Lucas Marx Music
- Recorded at Unsub Studios, Los Angeles, and Secret Garden Studios, Santa Barbara, California
- Mixed at MixStar Studios, Virginia Beach, Virginia
- Mastered at The Mastering Palace, New York, New York

Personnel

- Katy Perry – vocals, songwriting
- Bruce Wiegner – songwriting, production, co-production, programming
- The Monsters & Strangerz – production, programming
  - Jordan K. Johnson – songwriting
  - Stefan Johnson – songwriting
- German – production, programming
- Bart Schoudel – vocal production, programming
- Jon Bellion – songwriting
- Lucas Marx – songwriting
- Oliver Peterhof – songwriting
- Rachel Kanner – songwriting
- Rachael Findlen – engineering, recording, studio personnel
- Serban Ghenea – mixing, studio personnel
- John Hanes – mixing engineering
- Dave Kutch – mastering

=== Music video credits ===
Credits adapted from music video's promotional poster.

- Carlos López Estrada – writing, directing
- Doug Klinger – writing, executive production
- Katy Perry – writing, starring
- Nicole Jordan Webber – production
- Andrew Chennisi – production
- Yusef Chabayta – production
- Maverick Media – animation
- Targa Sahyoun – commission
- Anna Heinrich – head of production
- Vance Lorenzini – production designer
- Santiago Gonzales – photography direction
- Julian Conner – postproduction
- Cami Starkman – edition
- Meili Aspen Caputo – starring

== Charts ==
Chart performance for "Electric"
Chart (2021)	Peak position
Canada Hot 100 (Billboard)	97
Czech Republic Airplay (ČNS IFPI)	15
Ecuador Anglo (Monitor Latino)	15
El Salvador (Monitor Latino)	20
Germany Download (Official German Charts)	33
Global 200 (Billboard)	120
Italy Airplay (EarOne)	52
Japan Hot Overseas (Billboard Japan)	1
Latvia (EHR)	33
Mexico (Billboard Mexican Airplay)	45
New Zealand Hot Singles (RMNZ)	19
Panama Anglo (Monitor Latino)	8
Uruguay Anglo (Monitor Latino)	15
US Digital Song Sales (Billboard)	25

== Certifications ==
Region	Certification	Certified units/sales
Brazil (Pro-Música Brasil)	Gold	20,000^{‡}
^{‡} Sales+streaming figures based on certification alone.

== Release history ==
Release dates and formats for "Electric"
Region	Date	Format(s)	Label	Ref.
Various	May 14, 2021	Digital download; streaming	Capitol	
Italy	May 14, 2021	Radio airplay	Universal	
Various	June 25, 2021	CD single	Capitol	
