= Chip Detweiler =

American architect (1932–1984)

- Born: Walter Booser Detweiler; September 19, 1932; Harrisburg, Pennsylvania
- Died: February 4, 1984 (aged 51); Honolulu, Hawaii
- Occupation: architect

Walter Booser "Chip" Detweiler (September 19, 1932 – February 4, 1984) was an American architect who practiced primarily in Hawai’i. He was best known the design of his private residence on Round Top Drive, which won a Western Home Award sponsored by the American Institute of Architects and Sunset magazine.

Detweiler’s choices of rugged site and use of strong clean lines, intersecting planes and indigenous materials places his work solidly in the Tropical Modernism or Tropical Brutalist style.

== Early life and education ==
Detweiler was born in Harrisburg, Pennsylvania on September 19, 1932. He graduated from Carnegie Mellon University in 1955 with a Bachelor of Architecture. From 1955 to 1957, Detweiler served in the United States Army as First lieutenant and Construction Supervisor in the United States Army Corps of Engineers, at Andersen Air Force Base in Guam. He did one year of graduate architectural studies at Yale University.

== Career ==
Returning to the United States from Guam in 1957, Detweiler joined the firm D.K. Ritchey Associates in Pittsburgh, Pennsylvania, as a draftsman, delineator and designer, and spent two years working on local community space projects such as Northview Heights Housing, the Frick Park Nature Museum and the gymnasium/natatorium for the University of Pittsburgh. After a brief stint in Los Angeles working for the firm Daniel, Mann, Johnson and Mendenhall, and then a four-month trip to Japan, Detweiler returned to the East coast to pursue graduate studies in architecture at Yale University, but left the program after only one year, purportedly after a very harsh critique of a class project by Paul Rudolph.

=== Southeast Asia ===
Detweiler next turned up in Manila Philippines, where he was the chief architect for all Southeast Asia projects for Adrian Wilson and Associates, a successful California-based architecture firm handling many government and military contracts. A selected list of Detweiler’s projects taken from his 1968 resume includes various officer’s clubs, storage facilities and a theater at Mactan Air Base in Cebu, in the Philippines, operational facilities and housing at Clark Air Base on Luzon Island, in the Philippines, Saigon Military Hospital in Vietnam, and military recreational facilities in Okinawa Japan and Taiwan. Detweiler remained in Southeast Asia until 1967.

=== Meyers, Detweiler & Associates firm ===
Detweiler landed next in Honolulu, Hawaii. He worked for one year as chief designer and associate partner for Leo S. Wou and Associates, before establishing his own firm in 1968, with partner Irwin Don Meyers. Projects included proposed and built residences on Lot 85 and Lot 49 in the Koko-kai neighborhood of Oahu, as well as additions on other homes and offices. The firm’s first major project was the Airport Center building on Ualena Street in Honolulu, built for F.T. Opperman and Associates. With its bold, modern design the building remains a local landmark to this day, made even more iconic by the addition of giant murals depicting breaching whales painted by artist Wyland on one side of the structure in the late 1990s.

=== Residential projects ===
In 1973, Detweiler designed and built a private residence for himself on Round Top Drive in Honolulu, constructed on a steep, what some considered “unbuildable” site with sweeping views of the city. Detweiler’s design for the house—simple yet clever with intersecting horizontal and vertical planes, blends Tropical Modernism and Brutalist architecture. The house—referred to as the Detweiler House—fits seamlessly into its hillside environment, with a carefully designed air circulation system involving large clerestory windows with cantilevered glass and other openings with louvered wooden jalousie blinds, which channel the Hawaiian trade winds through the house, cooling it naturally and eliminating the need for a mechanical system. Detweiler lived in the house—first with his wife Ginny and then later with his professional and life partner designer Dian Cleve—until his death in 1984.

Detweiler’s other major residential project was a house on Loa Ridge, also in Honolulu. It is a very similar siting and design to Detweiler House—another steep site with spectacular views, the design also featuring horizontal planes and a cleverly designed air flow system that takes advantage of the location. His partner Dian Cleve designed the interiors, using the surrounding landscape as inspiration for the palette.

In 2020, the house was listed for sale, Vilcek Foundation President Rick Kinsel purchased Detweiler House, and had the house meticulously restored to the architect’s original design and intention using Detweiler’s archive of drawings.

== Recognition and awards ==
The Detweiler House won an American Institute of Architects-Sunset Magazine Merit Award in 1978. In 2022, after Kinsel’s restoration, the house won a project award from the Historic Hawaii Foundation. In 2022, it was an Editor’s Pick for The Architect’s Newspaper's Best of Design Award in residential restoration. In 2023 Detweiler House was also accepted for inclusion on the Hawaii State Historic Register.

Detweiler's Hawaii Loa Ridge house also won an HS/A.I.A. Design Award/Award of Merit in 1984, which was reported in Hawaii Architect, the Journal of the Hawaii Society of the American Institute of Architects.

== Personal life and death ==
Chip Detweiler said about his work, “The idea of architecture gives complete meaning to my life. The intellectual, spatial, functional and economic relationships are the inevitable reflection of truth, honesty and integrity, which are the ideals I strive for in my life.”

Detweiler died on February 4, 1984.
