= Kaimana Hila =

1916 Hawaiian song

Song by Charles E. King
- Language: Hawaiian
- Released: 1916
- Genre: Hawaii music
- Length: 2 minutes
- Songwriter: Charles E king
- Composer: Charles E. King
- Lyricist: Andrew Cumming

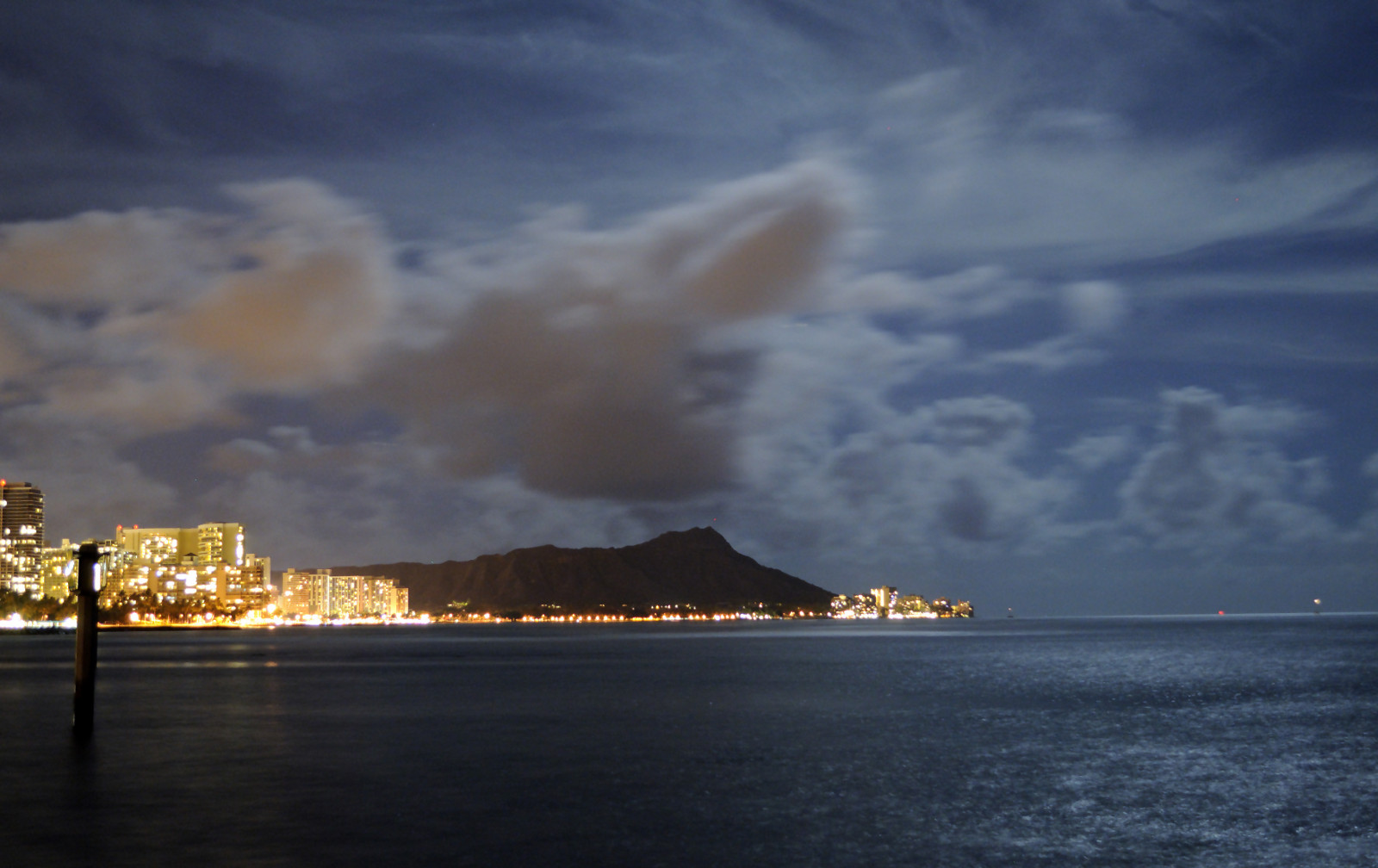
A recent view of Diamond Head and Waikiki, Honolulu, Hawaii

Kaimana Hila is a Hawaiian language song composed in 1916 by Charles E. King, assisted by Andrew Cummings, it is about the volcano named Diamond Head, which can be also viewed from Waikiki beach on Honolulu, Oahu Island.

Kaimana Hila means Diamond head, from the Hawaiian word "Kaimana", which means diamond, and the English word hill. It is one of the popular Hawaiian songs, like Aloha Oe, On a Little Bamboo Bridge, Blue Hawaii, and the King's other song, the Hawaiian Wedding Song.

It is extremely popular in Japan, because of the imagery of Diamond head from Waikiki, Honolulu, the Japanese people's most popular tourist destination in Hawaii.

Kaimana Hila is a direct English translation, where the true Hawaiian name for the crater is Lē’ahi.

The music is melodious and easy to remember. The words start with the following lines are:

Kaimana Hila
Iwaho makou i ka po nei
'Ike i ka nani Kaimana Hila ...

Translation: Diamond head
We went out at night
And saw beautiful Diamond head ...

== See also ==
- Music of Hawaii
- Category:Hawaiian-language songs
