= Diamond Head Theatre =

Coordinates: 21°16.280′N 157°48.149′W

The Diamond Head Theatre is the oldest performing arts center in Hawaii, opened in 1915. Locally known as the "Broadway of the Pacific", it is located on the slopes of Diamond Head in Honolulu, Hawaii.

== History ==
On April 28, 1915, a new theatrical group called the Footlights was born when Will Lewers, Mrs. Walter F. Dillingham, Helen Alexander, Margaret Center and Gerrit Wilder appeared in The Amazons by Pinero. The performance took place at the Honolulu Opera House, where the main post office on Merchant Street now stands. The legacy of those theatre lovers grew into the third-oldest, continuously operating theatre in the entire United States.

In 1934, the Footlights reorganized and took on a new name: Honolulu Community Theatre. In the original mission statement, still honored today, the theatre committed itself to community service through the art of theatre, involving the people of Hawaii as audience members, stage crew and performers.

During World War II, Honolulu Community Theatre productions entertained thousands of troops at over 300 performances throughout the Pacific (a tradition they continued with the Pacific tour of Ain't Misbehavin' during the 1990 season). Then, in 1952, Honolulu Community Theatre took up residence in the Fort Ruger Theatre, the Army Post's then movie house. Major refurbishments to make that structure a fully modern venue for stage productions included the addition of scene and costume shops, installation of lighting and sound systems, handicapped-accessible restrooms, a first-ever lobby for patrons and an upstairs addition for expanded office space, spotlights, and sound and lighting boards.

In 1990, Honolulu Community Theatre was renamed Diamond Head Theatre. Each season Diamond Head Theatre offers six mainstage theatrical productions, including five major musicals. They provide theatre workshops to train residents of Hawaii in the theatrical arts. Acting, voice and dance classes for children, teens, and adults are offered throughout the year. Diamond Head Theatre's Shooting Stars, a youth performing arts troupe, provides exposure and training to area youth.

== Past seasons ==
=== 2007–2008 season ===
- The Best Little Whorehouse in Texas, September 21 – October 7, 2007
- Meet Me in St. Louis, November 30 – December 16, 2007
- Barefoot in the Park, February 1–17, 2008
- Flower Drum Song, March 21, 2008 – April 6, 2008
- The Producers, May 16 – June 1, 2008
- The Wizard of Oz, July 11–27, 2008

=== 2008–2009 season ===
- Les Misérables, a Hawaii Community Theatre premiere, September 26, 2008 – October 12, 2008
- Peter Pan, December 5–31, 2008
- Souvenir, a Hawaii premiere, January 30 – February 15, 2009
- Gypsy, March 20 – April 5, 2009
- Dirty Rotten Scoundrels, a Hawaii premiere, May 15–31, 2009
- The Wedding Singer, a Hawaii premiere, July 10–26, 2009

=== 2009–2010 season ===
- The Drowsy Chaperone, a Hawaii premiere, September 25 – October 11, 2009
- Irving Berlin's White Christmas, a Hawaii premiere, December 4–20, 2009
- The Joy Luck Club, January 29 – February 14, 2010
- SHOUT! The Mod Musical, a Hawaii premiere, March 19 – April 4, 2010
- Guys and Dolls, May 14–30, 2010
- The Sound of Music, July 9–25, 2010
