= Deadwyler =

Deadwyler is a surname. Notable people with the surname include:

- Danielle Deadwyler (born 1982), American actress
- Leonard Deadwyler (1941–1966), victim of a police shooting in Los Angeles

== See also ==
- Detwiler
