= Diamond Head, Hawaii =

Volcanic tuff cone on the Hawaiian island of Oʻahu

Diamond Head
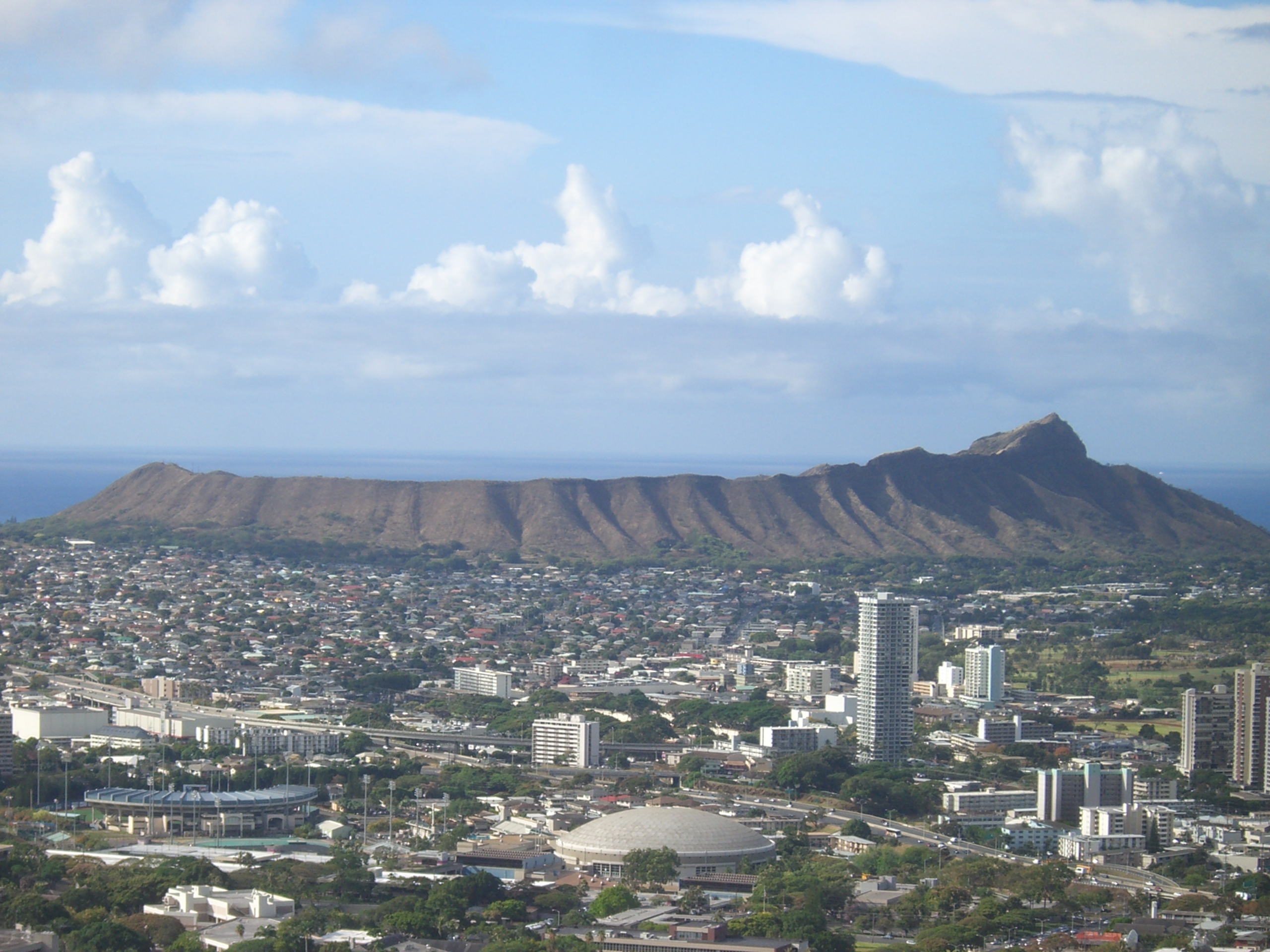
- Diamond Head cone seen from Tantalus-Round Top Road

Highest point
- Elevation: 762 ft (232 m)
- Prominence: 596 ft (182 m)
- Coordinates: 21°15′43″N 157°48′20″W

Geography
- Location within Oahu Location within Hawaii
- Location: Honolulu, Hawaii, US
- Parent range: Hawaiian Islands
- Topo map: USGS Honolulu

Geology
- Rock age: 200,000 years
- Mountain type: Volcanic cone
- Last eruption: Unknown

Climbing
- Easiest route: Trail

U.S. National Natural Landmark
- Designated: 1968

View from the top of Diamond Head, 2015

Diamond Head is a volcanic tuff cone on the Hawaiian island of Oʻahu. It is known to Hawaiians as Lēʻahi (pronounced [leːˈʔɐhi]), which is most likely derived from lae (browridge, promontory) plus ʻahi (tuna) because the shape of the ridgeline resembles the shape of a tuna's dorsal fin. Its English name was given by British sailors in the 19th century, who named it for the calcite crystals on the adjacent beach.

== Geology ==
Diamond Head is part of the system of cones, vents, and their associated eruption flows that are collectively known to geologists as the Honolulu Volcanic Series, formed by renewed eruptions from the Koʻolau Volcano that took place long after the volcano formed and had gone dormant. These eruptive events created many of Oʻahu's well-known landmarks, including Punchbowl Crater, Hanauma Bay, Koko Head, and Mānana Island.

Like the rest of the Honolulu Volcanic Series, Diamond Head is much younger than the main mass of the Koʻolau Mountain Range. While the Koʻolau Range is about 2.6 million years old, Diamond Head is estimated to be about 400,000 to 500,000 years old.

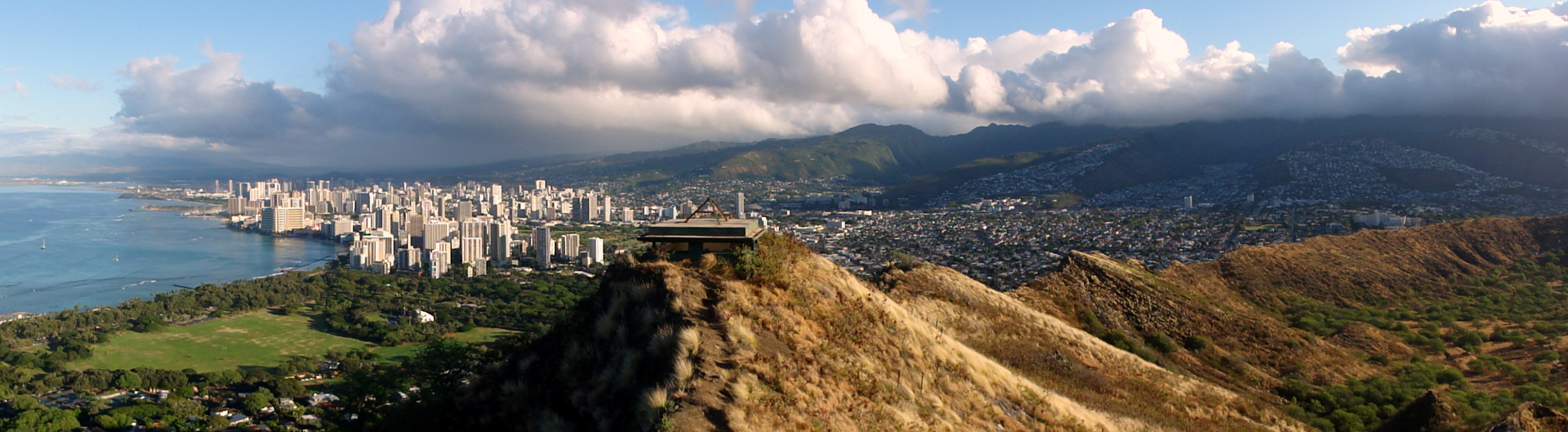
View from the rim showing the Waikiki neighborhood (left), the cone (right), and the pillbox at the peak (middle)

== History ==
Known as Lēʻahi in Hawaiian, the mountain was given the name Diamond Hill in 1825 by British sailors who discovered sparkling volcanic calcite crystals in the sand and mistook them for diamonds. This is reflected in another local name, Kaimana Hila. The name later became Diamond Head, with head being shortened from headland.

The interior and adjacent exterior areas were the home to Fort Ruger, the first United States military reservation on Hawaii. Only Battery 407, a National Guard emergency operations center, and Birkhimer Tunnel, the Hawaii State Civil Defense Headquarters (HI-EMA), remain in use in the crater. An FAA air traffic control center was in operation from 1963 to 2002.

== Tourism ==
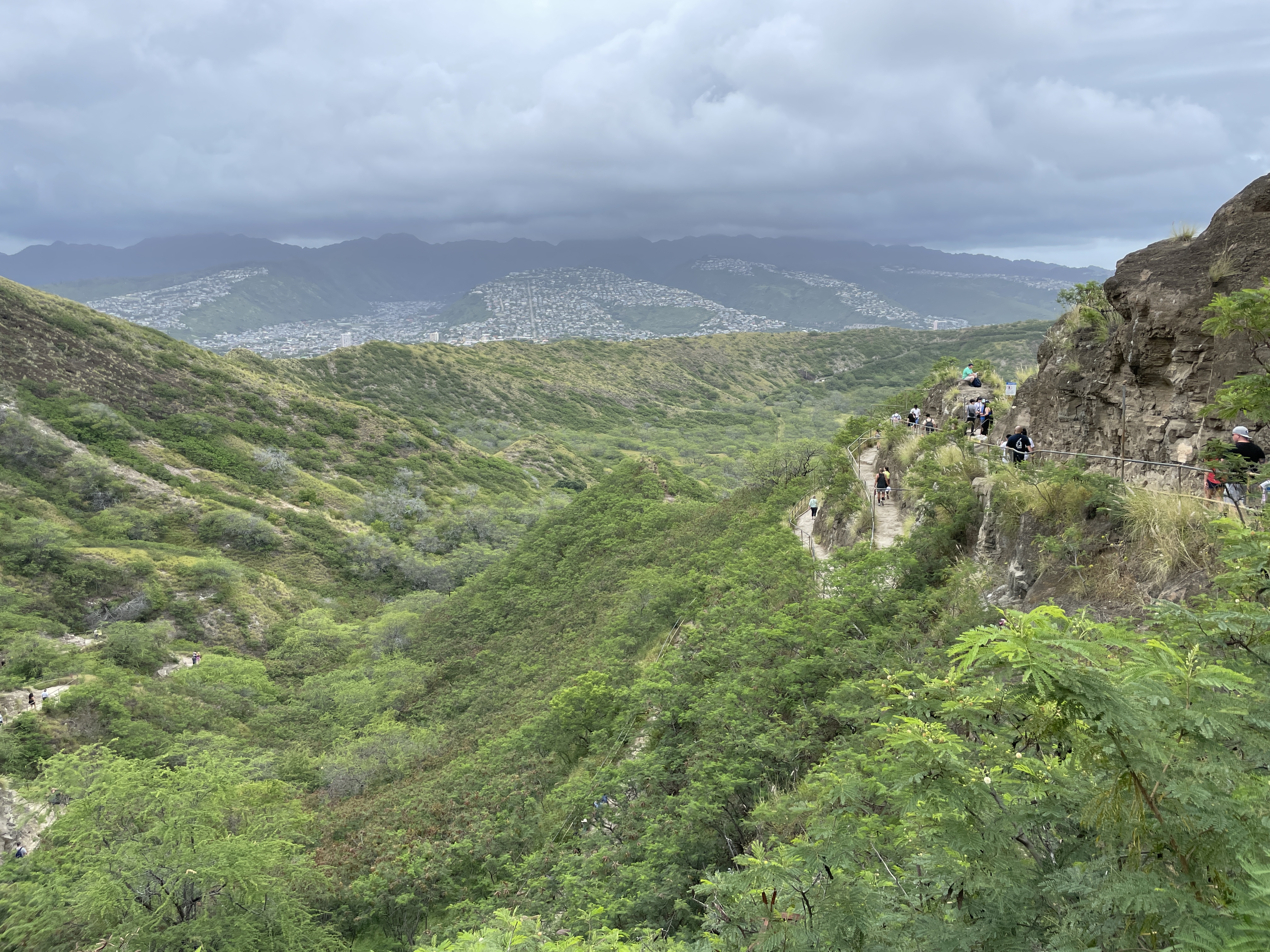
People on the trail, 2023

Diamond Head is an iconic landmark overlooking Honolulu, and is featured as a backdrop to Waikīkī in numerous movies and TV shows set in Hawaii. It is both a State Monument and, since 1968, a U.S. National Natural Landmark. While part of it is closed to the public and serves as a platform for antennas used by the U.S. government, a 0.8 mile trail open to tourists leads to the summit from the Visitors Center at the crater floor. Access to the trail for non-Hawaii residents requires reservation online beforehand and a small fee. The trail was originally built in 1908 as part of the U.S. Army Coastal Defense System. The trail rises 560 feet and includes a series of steep paths, stairs, and tunnels. At the summit are several bunkers which were used as a control station to direct artillery fire in case of war. The view from the top and its proximity to Honolulu's resort hotels and beaches makes the summit a popular tourist destination.

== National Natural Landmark ==
In 1968, Diamond Head was declared a National Natural Landmark. The crater, also called Diamond Head Lookout, was used as a strategic military lookout in the early 1900s. Spanning over 475 acres (190 ha) (including the crater's interior and outer slopes), it served as an effective defensive lookout because it provides panoramic views of Waikiki and the south shore of Oahu.

The Diamond Head Lighthouse, a navigational lighthouse built in 1917, is directly adjacent to the crater's slopes. In addition, a few pillboxes are on Diamond Head's summit.

== In popular culture ==
Diamond Head appears on an 80-cent air mail stamp issued in 1952 to pay for shipping orchids to the U.S. mainland.

Charlton Heston stars in the 1963 film Diamond Head, in a role that Clark Gable was supposed to play.

"Diamond Head" an instrumental song by Danny Hamilton recorded in 1964 by The Ventures, was an international hit. The song was especially popular in Japan where it became the first single to sell a million copies.

A 1975 televised game show, The Diamond Head Game, was set at Diamond Head.

Several television shows set in Hawaii feature episodes filmed on or near Diamond Head and include frequent shots of the crater as a scenic backdrop. These include the original 1968 Hawaii Five-O and 2010 reboot, as well as the original 1980 Magnum, P.I. and 2018 reboot.

The Crater was the location of several concerts in the 1960s and 1970s. First held on New Year's Day 1969, and often known as Hawaiian Woodstock, Diamond Head Crater Festivals, sometimes called Sunshine Festivals, were all-day music celebrations held in the 1960s and '70s, attracting over 75,000 attendees for performances of the Grateful Dead, Santana, America, Styx, Journey, War, and Tower of Power, alongside Hawaiian talent like Cecilio & Kapono and the Mackey Feary Band. The one-day festivals became two-day events in 1976 and 1977, but were canceled by the Hawai'i Department of Land and Natural Resources because of community noise and environmental impact concerns. Many items from the bands were brought into and out of the Crater by helicopter.

Diamond Head has been a popular theme in music. The 1916 Hawaiian language classic Kaimana Hila by Charles King is an ode to Diamond Head, as are songs by the Beach Boys and the Ventures, both titled "Diamond Head".

Fans of popular singer/songwriter Neil Diamond are often referred to as "Diamondheads".

Various views of Diamond Head

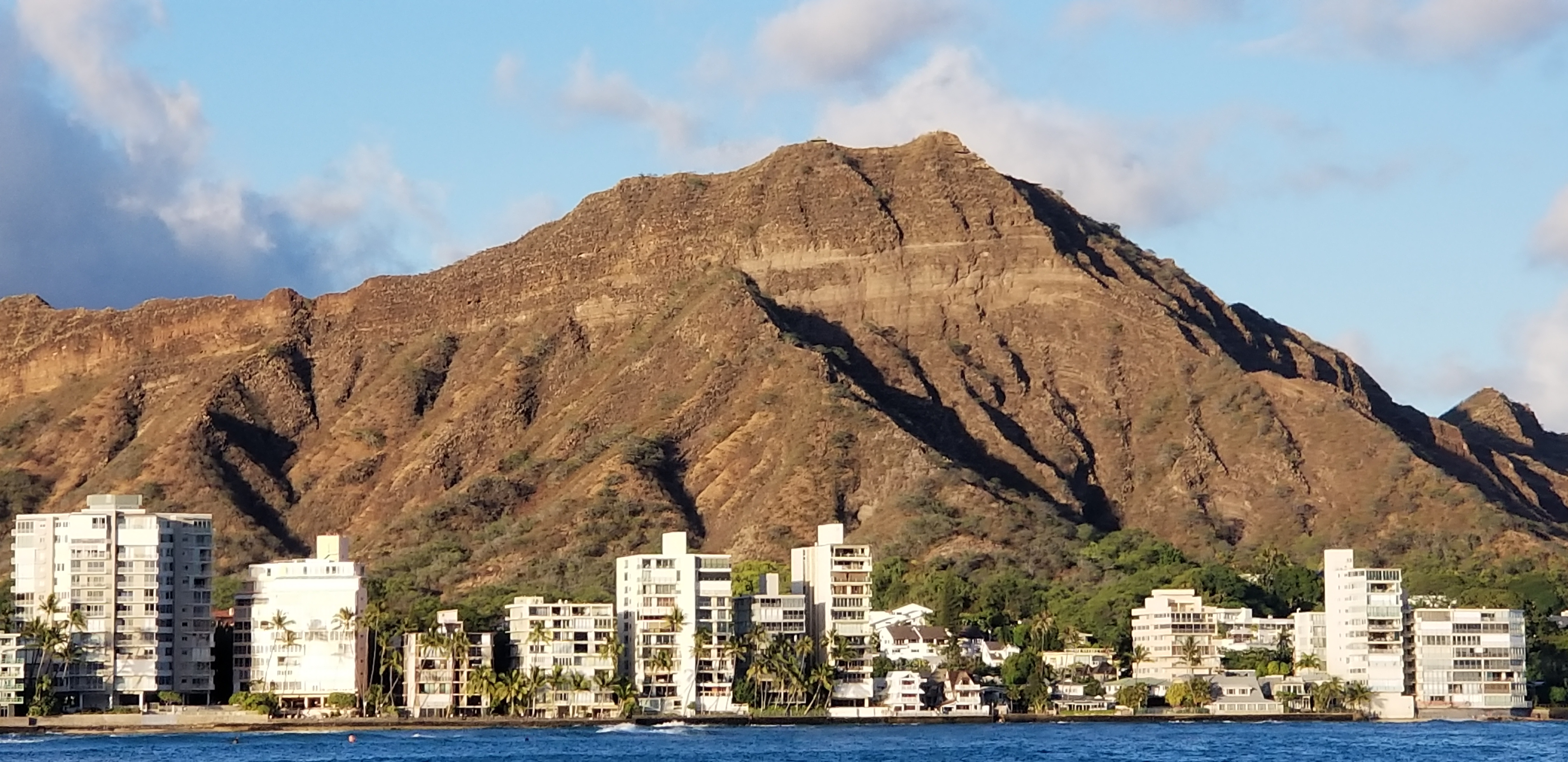
A view from the ocean of Diamond Head

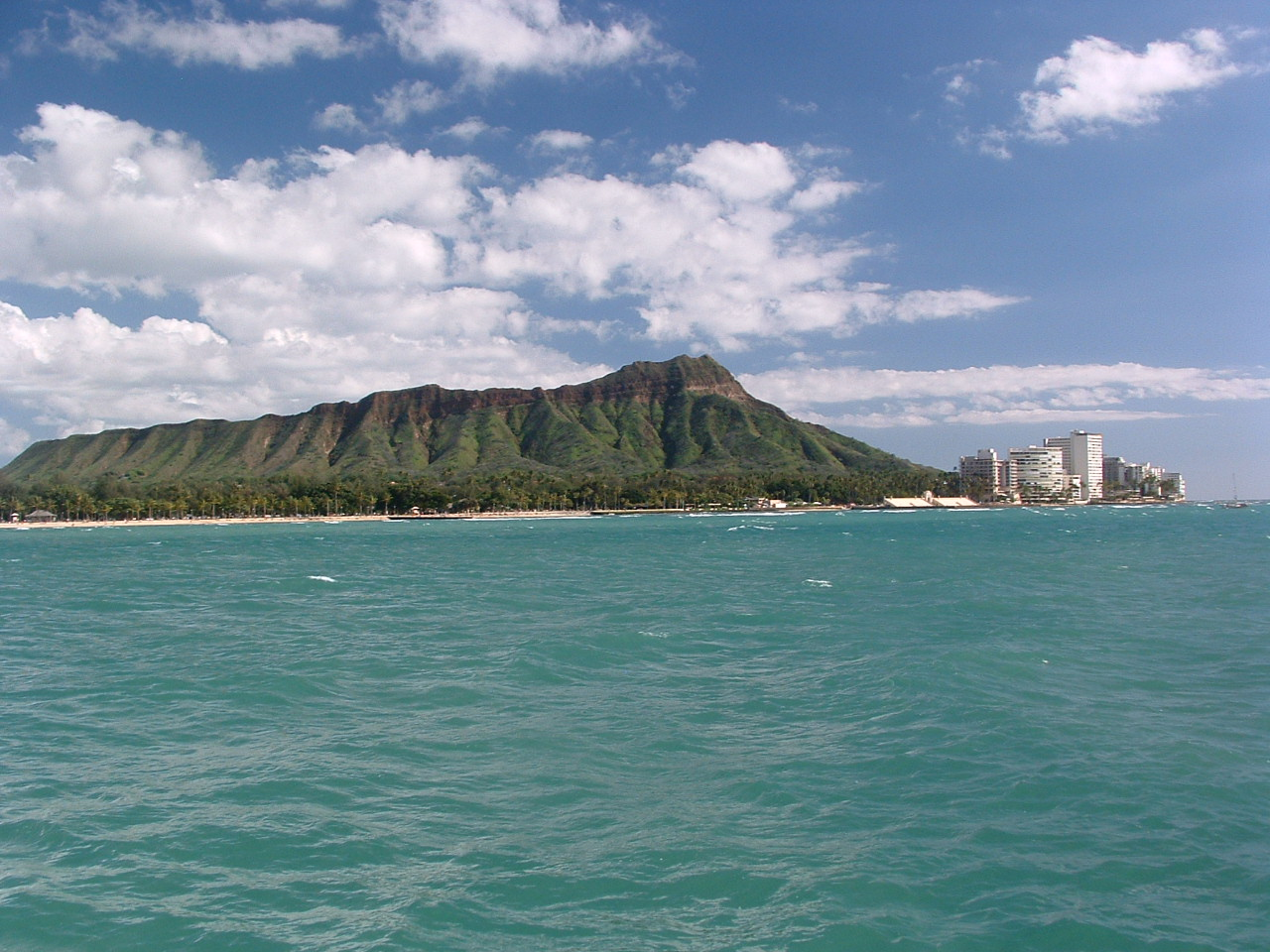
Diamond Head cone seen from the coast off Waikiki

Diamond Head seen from Punchbowl, Honolulu, approximately 1940s

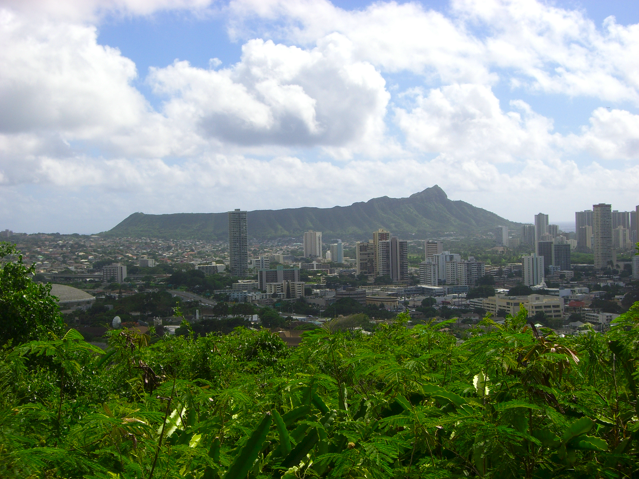
View from Rocky Hill, which resides over Punahou School

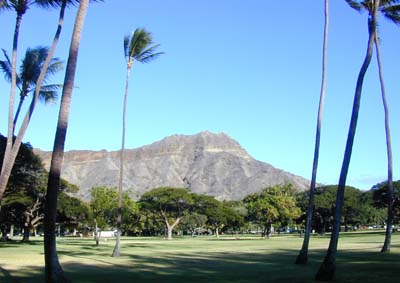
Diamond Head peak from Kapiolani Park

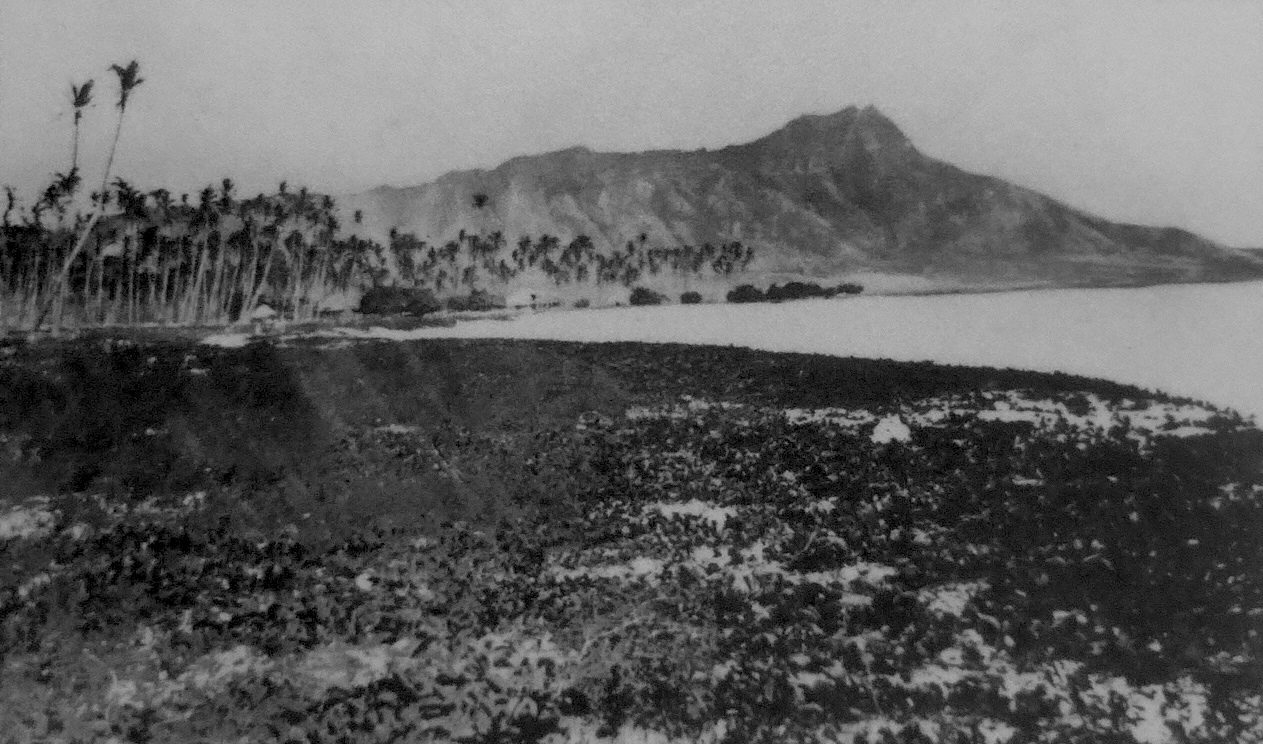
Diamond Head seen from Waikiki in the 1800s

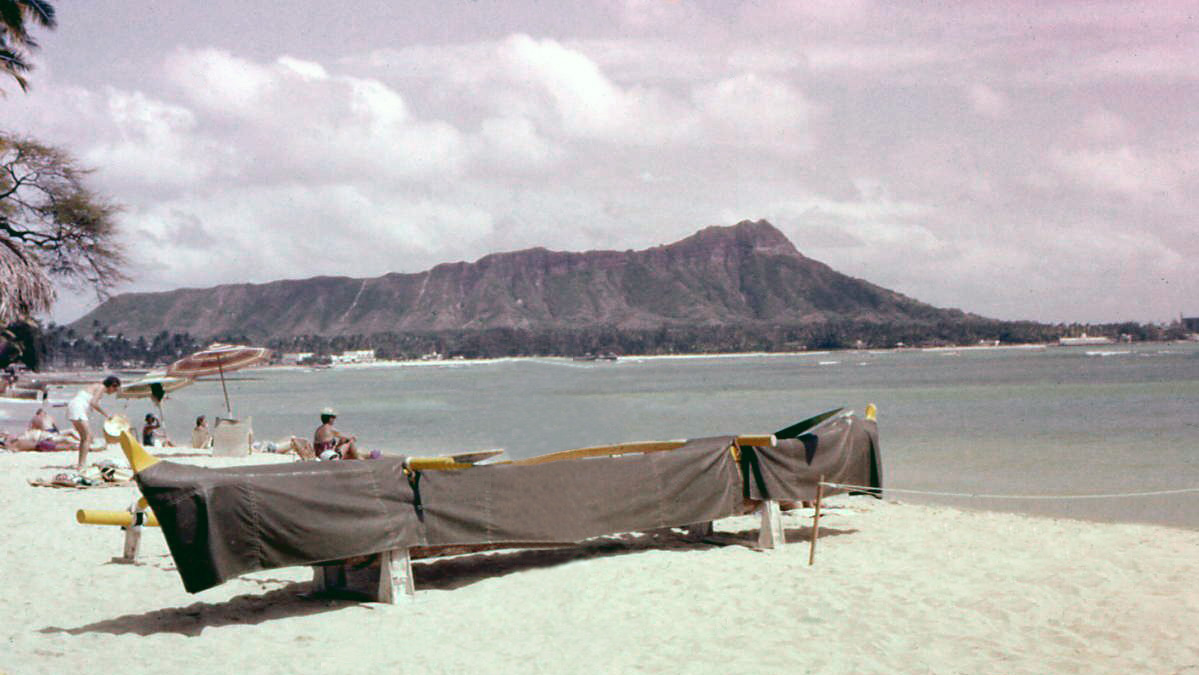
Waikiki Beach facing Diamond Head, 1958

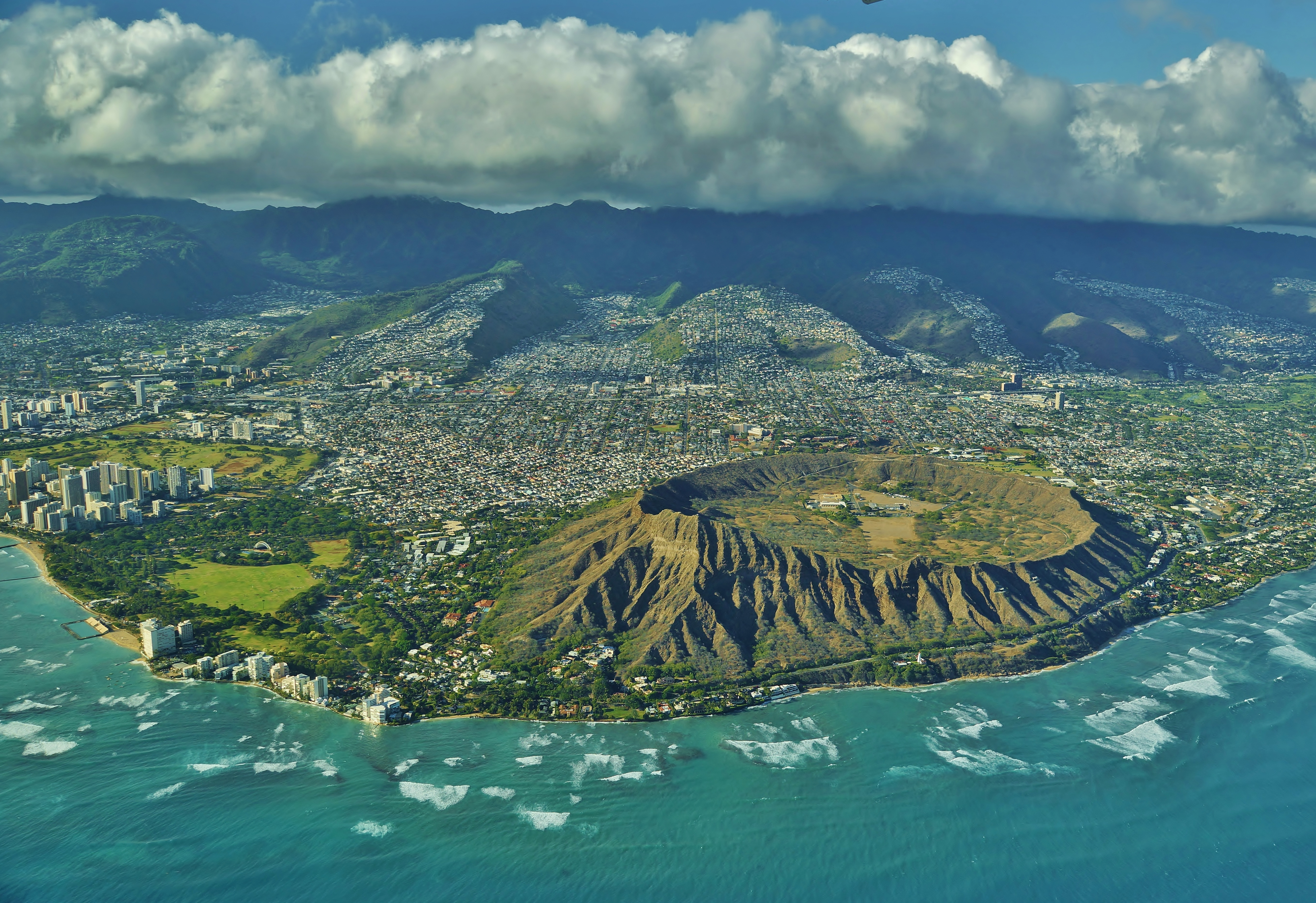
Aerial view of the cone, and the Kahala and Kaimuki neighborhoods

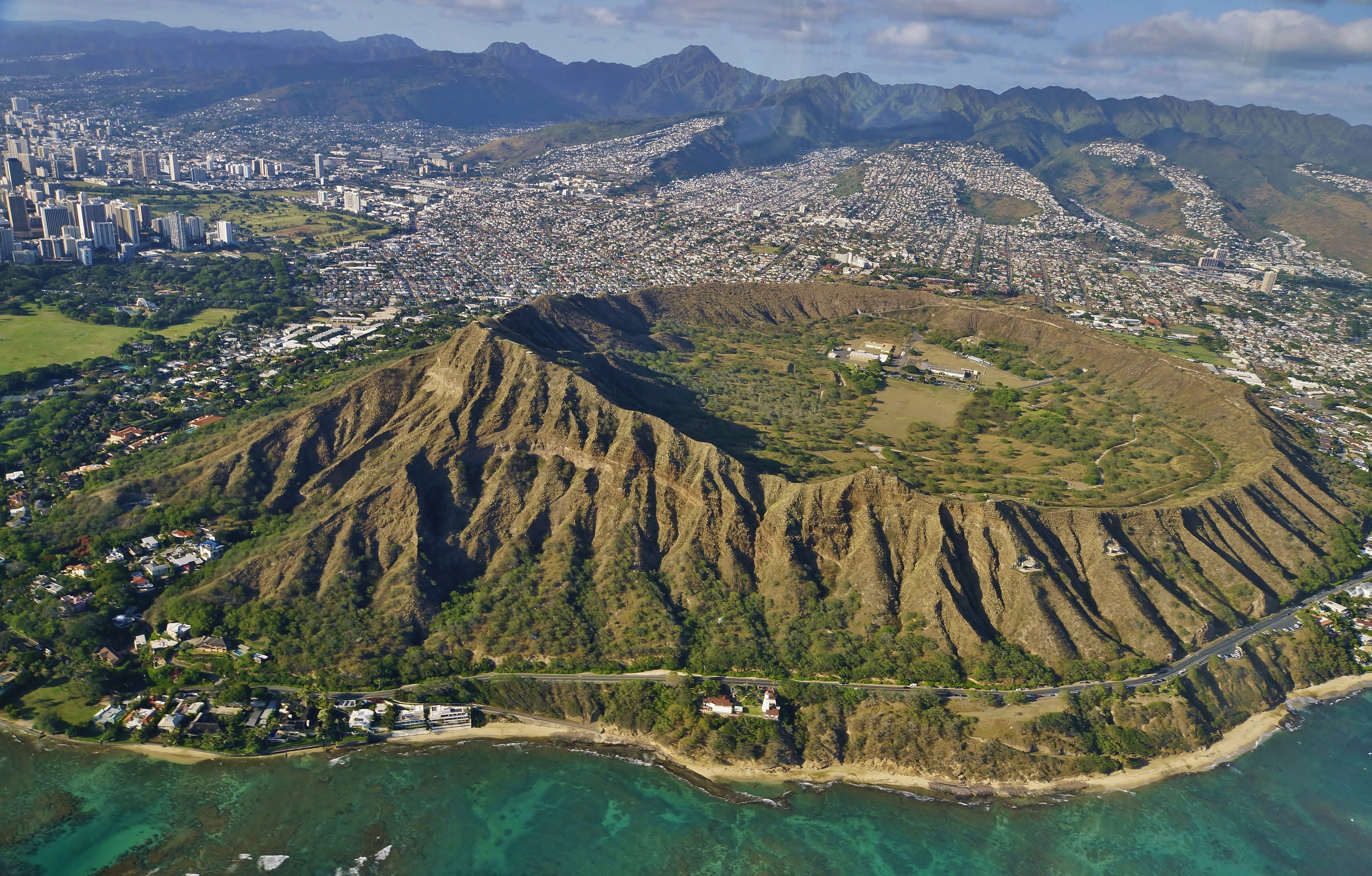
Aerial view of the Diamond Head

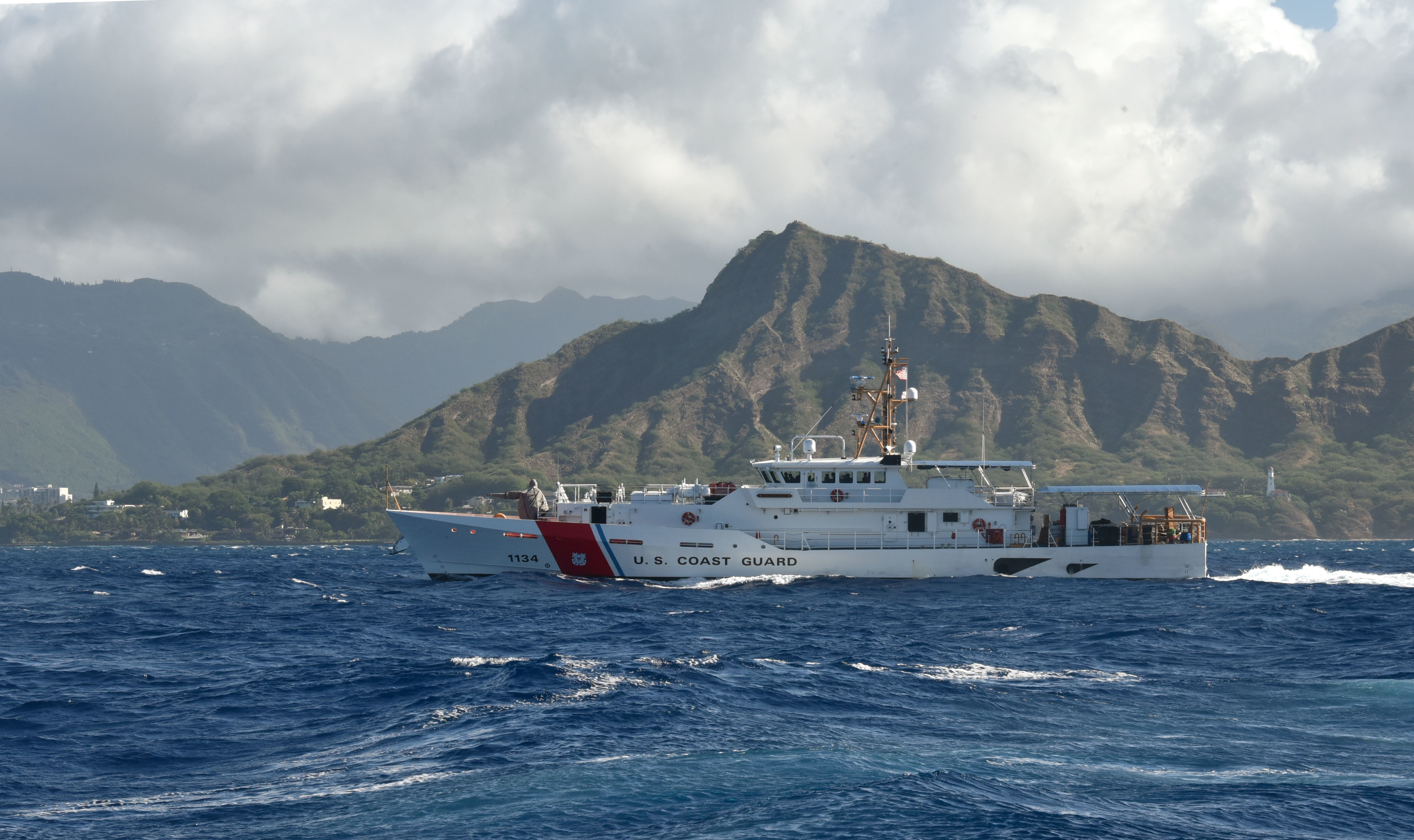
A view from the south, including Diamond Head Lighthouse

== See also ==
- Diamond Head Lighthouse
- Diamond Head Theatre
- Kapiʻolani Community College
