= Michele Detwiler =

American opera singer

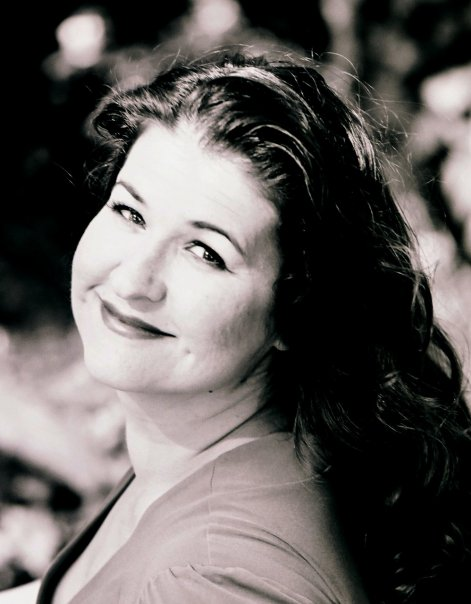
Michele Detwiler

Mezzo-soprano Michele Detwiler (born 1976 in California) is an American opera singer.

Since 2000, she has sung over fifteen roles with regional companies on the West Coast, favoring Gustav Mahler, Richard Strauss, bel canto and French repertoire.

From 2001 to 2007, she was a Principal Artist and Guest Artist with Opera San Jose where she sang in eighteen productions ranging from lyric to dramatic repertoire. In addition, Ms. Detwiler has sung with Sacramento Opera, West Bay Opera, Trinity Lyric Opera, San Francisco Lyric Opera, Mission City Opera, and Apollo Sierra Opera.

Critics have described her instrument as "amber-voiced", "a velvety mezzo soprano voice with excellent range", with some performances being cited as "riveting" and holding "center stage commandingly".

== Recent engagements ==
Role	Work	Company	Date
Flora	La traviata	Opera San Jose	2007
Suzuki	Madama Butterfly	Opera San Jose	2007
Soloist	Handel's Messiah	Boise Master Chorale	2007
Soloist	Herzogenberg's Die Geburt Christi	Boise Master Chorale	2008
Soloist	Einhorn's Voices of Light	Boise Philharmonic	2009
Siebel	Faust	Opera Idaho	2009
Tisbe	La Cenerentola	Opera Idaho	2010
Soloist	Candide Suite	Boise Philharmonic	2010

== Main Roles ==
• Zerlina (Don Giovanni)
• Dorabella (Così fan tutte)
• Stefano (Roméo et Juliette)
• Pauline (Pique Dame)
• Romeo (I Capuleti e i Montecchi)
• Meg Page (Falstaff)
• Suzuki (Madama Butterfly)
• Carmen (Carmen)
• Octavian (Der Rosenkavalier)
• Composer (Ariadne auf Naxos)
• Elizabeth Proctor (The Crucible)

== In Concert ==
• Messiah (Handel)
• Requiem (Mozart)
• Christmas Oratorio (Camille Saint-Saëns)
• Die Geburt Christi (Herzogenberg)
• Voices of Light (Einhorn)
