= Tantalus-Round Top Road =

- U.S. National Register of Historic Places
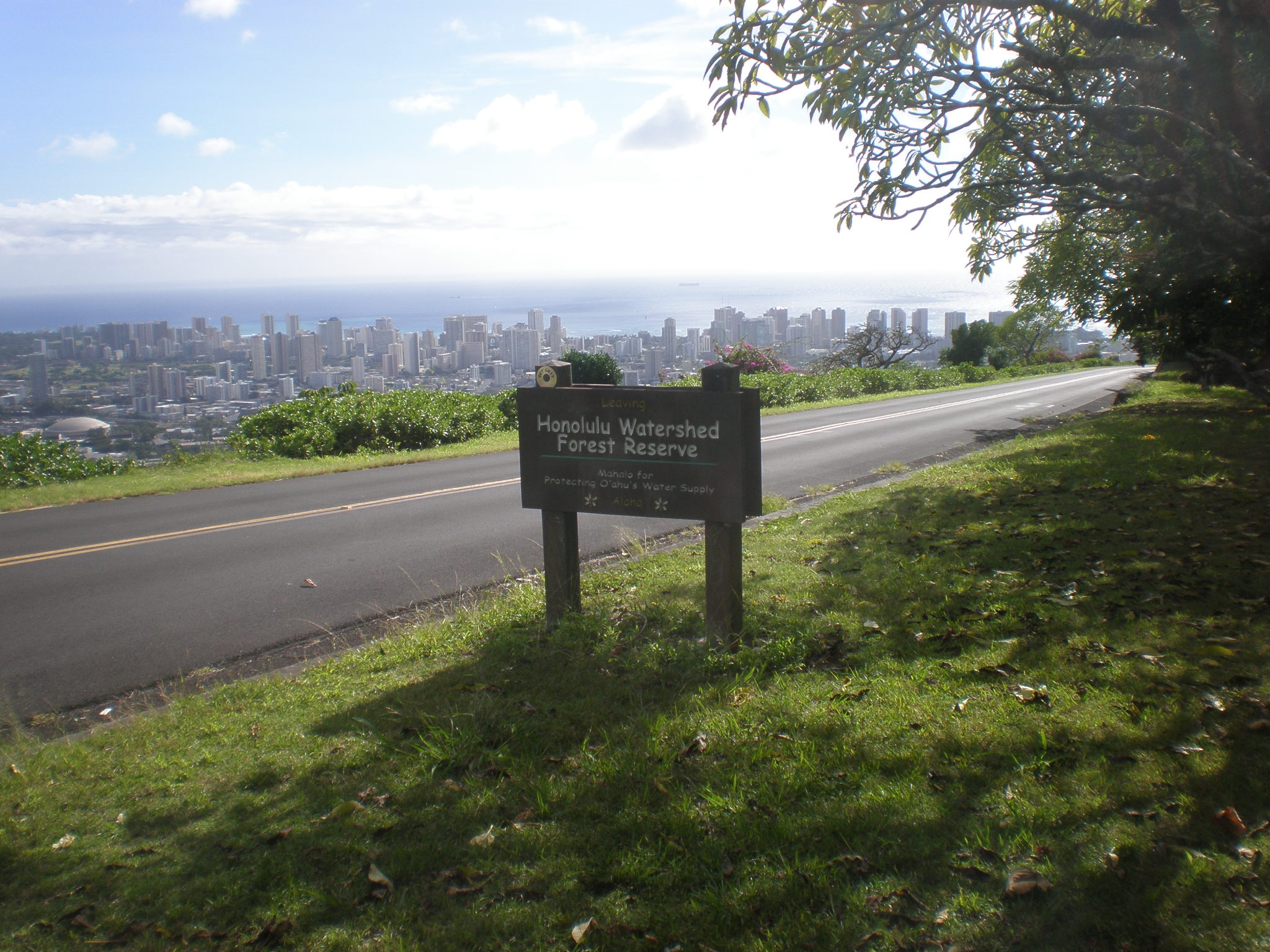
- Round Top Drive view of Waikiki

- Location within Oahu Location within Hawaii
- Nearest city: Honolulu, Hawaii
- Coordinates: 21°19′51″N 157°49′1″W
- Area: 7 miles
- Built: 1892
- NRHP reference No.: 08000373
- Added to NRHP: August 14, 2009

The winding, hillside road from Tantalus to Round Top in Honolulu, Hawaii, dates back to 1892. Tantalus Drive and Round Top Drive were gravel roads when they were completed in 1917, but were paved in 1937. In March 2007, a seven-mile stretch of the road was added to the State Register of Historic Places, and in August 2009 to the National Register of Historic Places, the first such designation for a roadway on Oahu. The more populated lower portions of Tantalus Drive and Round Top Drive were not so designated. This road joins the Hana Highway on Maui on the National Register, and 97 such Historic Roads nationally. Not all of the latter are on the National Register, but some are listed among the Federal Highway Administration's National Scenic Byways or All-American Roads.

== Gallery ==
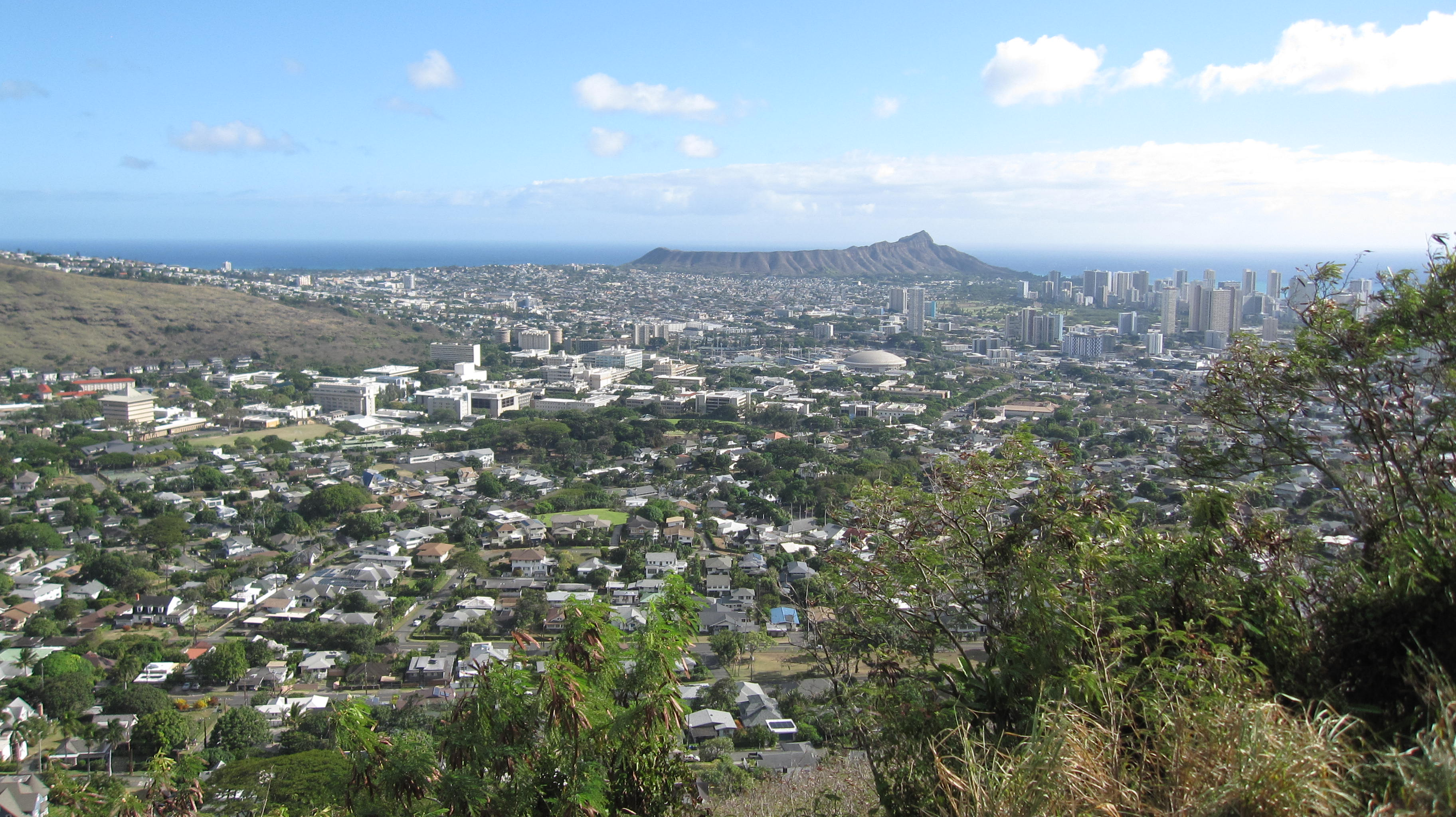
University of Hawaii at Manoa and Diamond Head from Round Top Drive

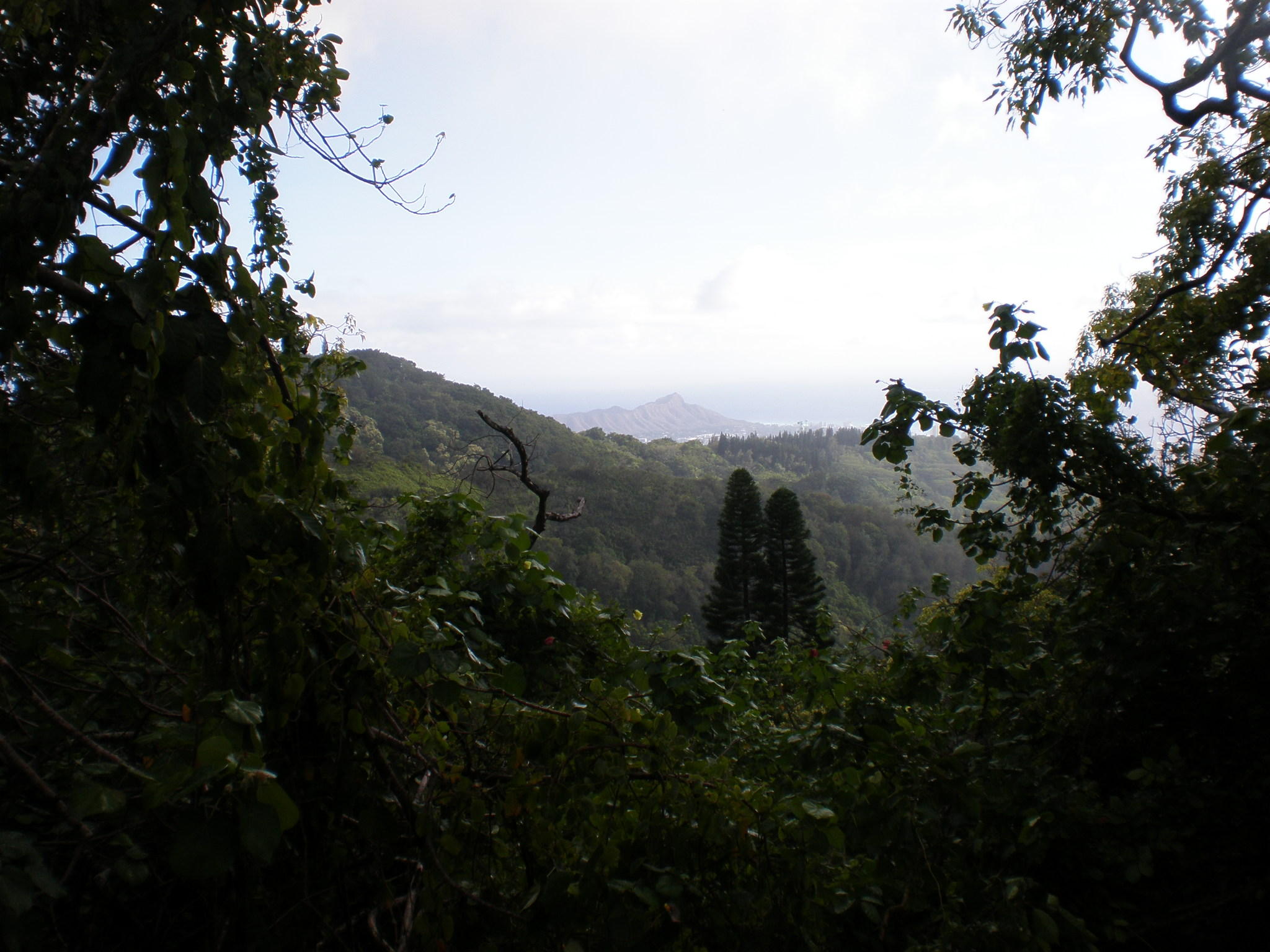
View of Diamond Head from Tantalus Drive

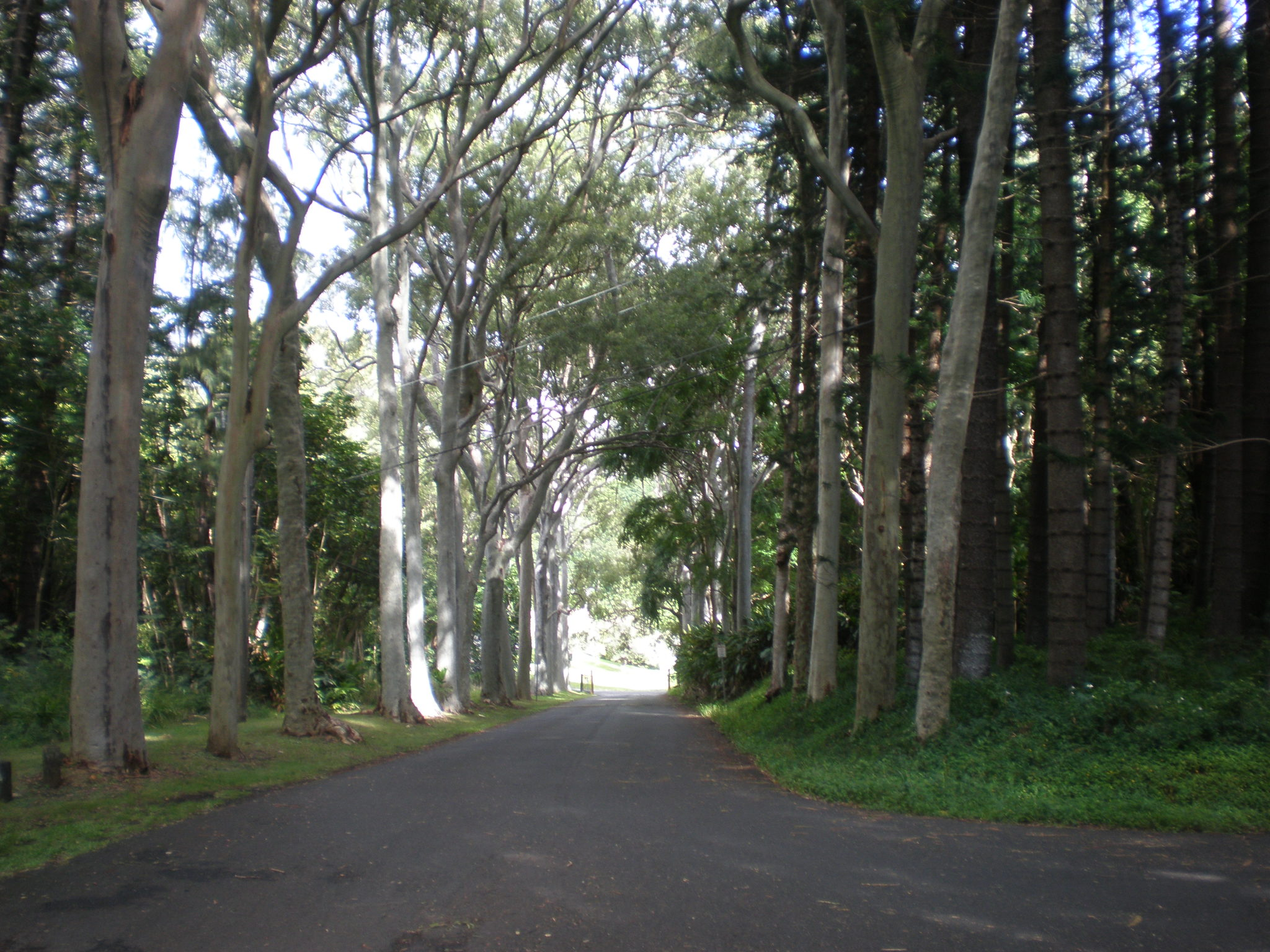
Trees lining Puʻu ʻUalakaʻa State Wayside entrance, Round Top Drive

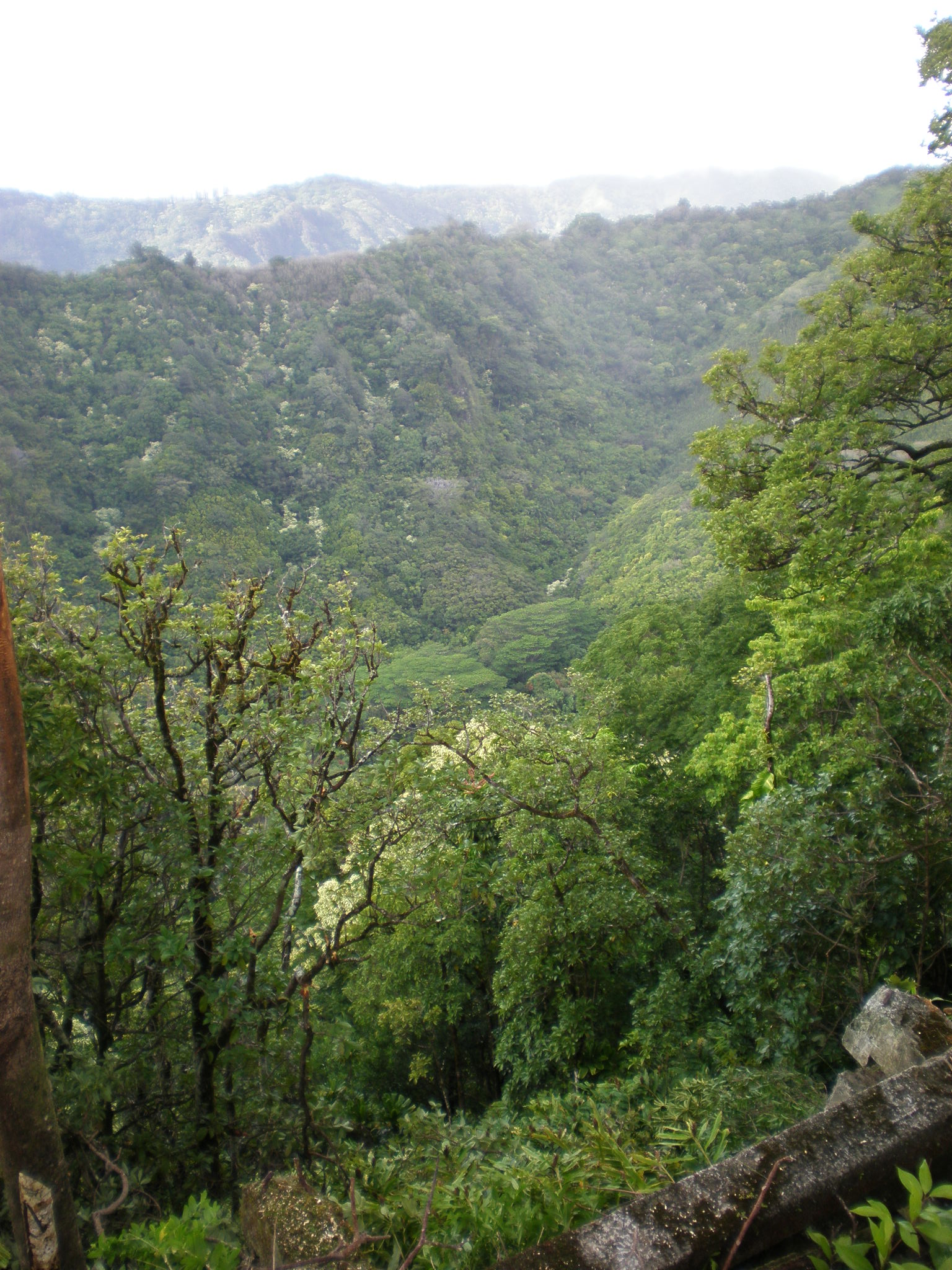
View toward Nuʻuanu Valley from Tantalus Drive

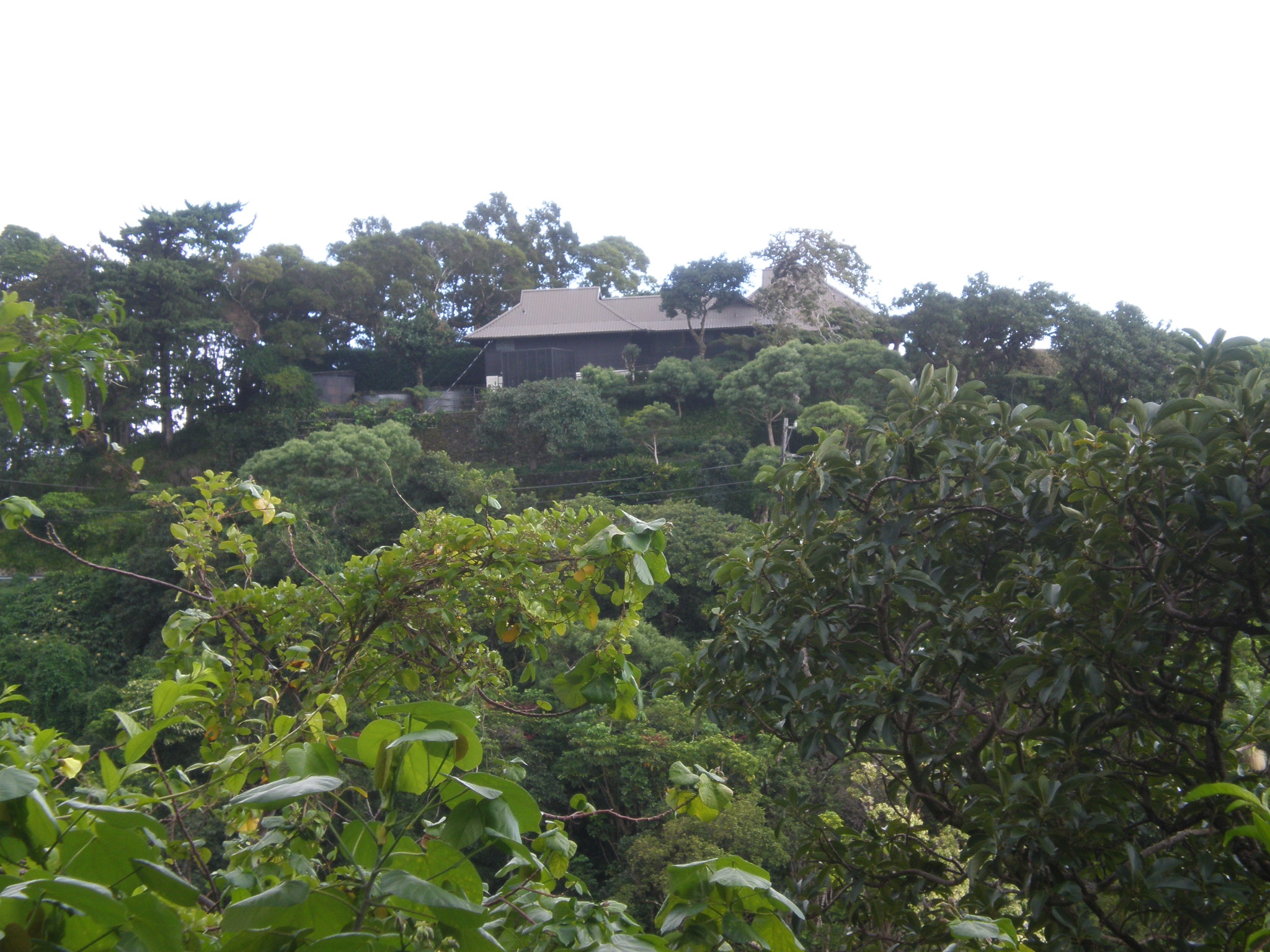
Mountaintop home and tropical foliage, Tantalus Drive

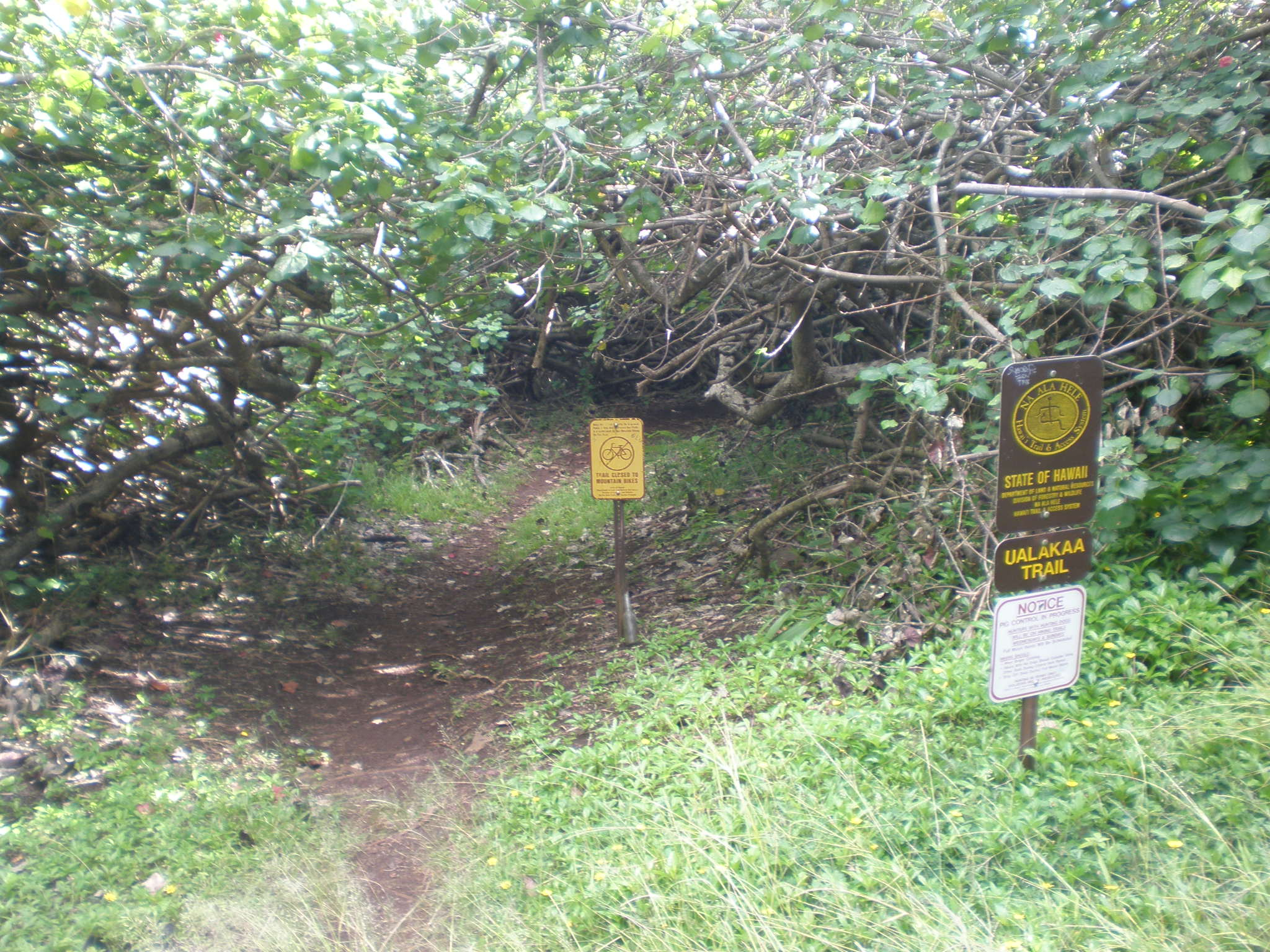
ʻUalakaʻa Trail crossing, Round Top Drive
