= Andrea Detwiler =

Accomplished costume designer

Andrea Detwiler is an accomplished costume designer. On April 28, 2006, Detwiler won an Emmy Award in the category of outstanding achievement in costume design/styling for her work on PBS's Sesame Street.

== Education ==
She is a 1991 graduate of Virginia Commonwealth University in Richmond, Virginia.

== Information ==
She currently is in England working on the new Muppet movie.
