= WhistlinDiesel =

American YouTuber (born 1998)

- Born: Cody Shane Detwiler; July 18, 1998 (age 28); Indiana, U.S.
- Years active: 2015–present

YouTube information
- Channel: WhistlinDiesel
- Genre: Automotive
- Subscribers: 10.7 million
- Views: 1.92 billion
- Last updated: August 8, 2026
- Website: whistlindiesel.com

Cody Shane Detwiler (born July 18, 1998), known online as WhistlinDiesel, is an American YouTuber known for automotive videos involving vehicle durability tests, modifications, off-roading, and the deliberate destruction of vehicles. Based in Nashville, Tennessee, his projects have included modified pickup trucks, a Ferrari F8, a Tesla Cybertruck, and a reconstruction of Marvin Heemeyer's armored bulldozer commonly known as the Killdozer.

== Early life ==
Cody Shane Detwiler was born on July 18, 1998, in Indiana.

== Career ==
In November 2020, Detwiler drove an eight-wheeled Chevrolet Silverado into the Gulf of Mexico off Anna Maria Island, Florida. The truck was later pulled from the water while the United States Coast Guard, local sheriff's office, and wildlife authorities responded. He received a $70 citation for improper registration of an aquatic vessel.

In October 2022, Detwiler and two other automotive content creators posted material suggesting that they had been arrested while filming in Dawson County, Georgia. The Dawson County Sheriff's Office subsequently said that it had worked with the creators as part of the staged video.

In August 2023, a 2020 Ferrari F8 Tributo owned by Detwiler caught fire while being driven in a field near Waco, Texas, during the filming of a video. The fire spread to nearby vegetation and a van before firefighters extinguished it.

In November 2023, Detwiler signed with Creative Artists Agency. Variety reported at the time that he was based in Nashville and had also established an apparel brand called MonsterMax.

=== Cybertruck durability tests ===
In August 2024, Detwiler began a series of videos comparing the durability of a Tesla Cybertruck with a Ford F-150. The first test included off-road obstacles, towing, impacts, and other deliberately extreme tests. During an attempted recovery of the F-150, part of the Cybertruck's rear structure and hitch separated. Road & Track noted that the Cybertruck had previously struck a concrete obstacle during the testing and that it was unclear how much prior damage contributed to the failure.

A second installment was released in January 2025. The vehicles were subjected to additional towing, payload, off-road, and water-crossing tests. During the testing, the Cybertruck sustained damage including a broken motor shaft and rear wheel assembly, while the F-150 also suffered mechanical damage.

The third part of the series was released in July 2026 after nearly two years of testing. It included further off-road testing in Moab, Utah, repeated repairs to the Cybertruck, and a remotely controlled high-speed collision in which the Cybertruck struck the F-150 at a displayed speed of 111 mph (179 km/h). Both vehicles were severely damaged in the collision.

=== Killdozer reconstruction ===
From January 2024 to July 2025, Detwiler and a team of seven worked on a reconstruction of the armored Komatsu D355A bulldozer built by Marvin Heemeyer, commonly referred to as the Killdozer. The project was created around the twentieth anniversary of Heemeyer's 2004 rampage in Granby, Colorado, and incorporated the original machine's hatch.

After completing the vehicle, Detwiler's team used it in videos involving obstacle destruction and durability tests using gunfire and explosives.

== Legal proceedings ==
In November 2025, Detwiler was arrested in Williamson County, Tennessee, following an indictment concerning Tennessee sales tax allegedly owed in connection with his purchase of the 2020 Ferrari F8 Tributo in 2023. Court documents cited by Road & Track contained one count relating to Detwiler and another relating to WhistlinDiesel LLC. The allegations concerned the vehicle's registration in Montana, which does not impose a general sales tax, while Tennessee authorities alleged that approximately $30,000 in Tennessee sales tax was owed.

Detwiler was released on a $20,000 bond. He disputed the allegations and said that Tennessee authorities had not contacted him regarding the claimed tax liability before his arrest. Following his arrest, he sold merchandise featuring his booking photograph and said that proceeds would be used toward his legal expenses.

In December 2025, a Tennessee judge imposed a limited gag order in the case.

Detwiler was arrested again in January 2026 after returning to Tennessee. He said the second arrest related to another vehicle involved in the tax investigation. He was released after posting bond.
