= MTV Unplugged (Katy Perry EP) =

2009 EP by Katy Perry

EP / live album by Katy Perry
- Released: November 17, 2009
- Recorded: July 22, 2009
- Venues: NEP Midtown Studios (New York City, New York)
- Genres: Jazz; lounge
- Length: 29:36 (EP); 45:00 (DVD)
- Label: Capitol
- Producer: Chris Garcia

Katy Perry chronology
| One of the Boys (2008) | MTV Unplugged (2009) | Teenage Dream (2010) |

MTV Unplugged is a live extended play (EP) by American singer-songwriter Katy Perry, released in the United States on November 17, 2009, by Capitol Records. After airing more than 100 MTV Unplugged specials, MTV wanted to bring back the series, in order to expose them to a younger generation. The channel recruited various mainstream and popular artists to perform as part of the series, including Perry, who particularly expressed interest in the idea as it would allow her to showcase herself as an artist and share the stories behind her songs. Her special was recorded at NEP Midtown Studios, based in New York City, New York.

The extended play, produced by Chris Garcia, includes acoustic lounge rearrangements of five songs from Perry's album One of the Boys (2008), a previously unreleased original song and a cover version of a song by Fountains of Wayne. Alongside the audio disc, the album includes a DVD with the video recording of her performance and an exclusive interview. Upon its release, MTV Unplugged received mixed reviews from critics, who questioned the idea of giving Perry's songs an acoustic treatment, while some deemed Perry a hard-working artist. On the US Billboard 200, the set debuted at number 168, while on the French and Swiss album charts, it reached numbers 192 and 82 respectively.

== Background and content ==
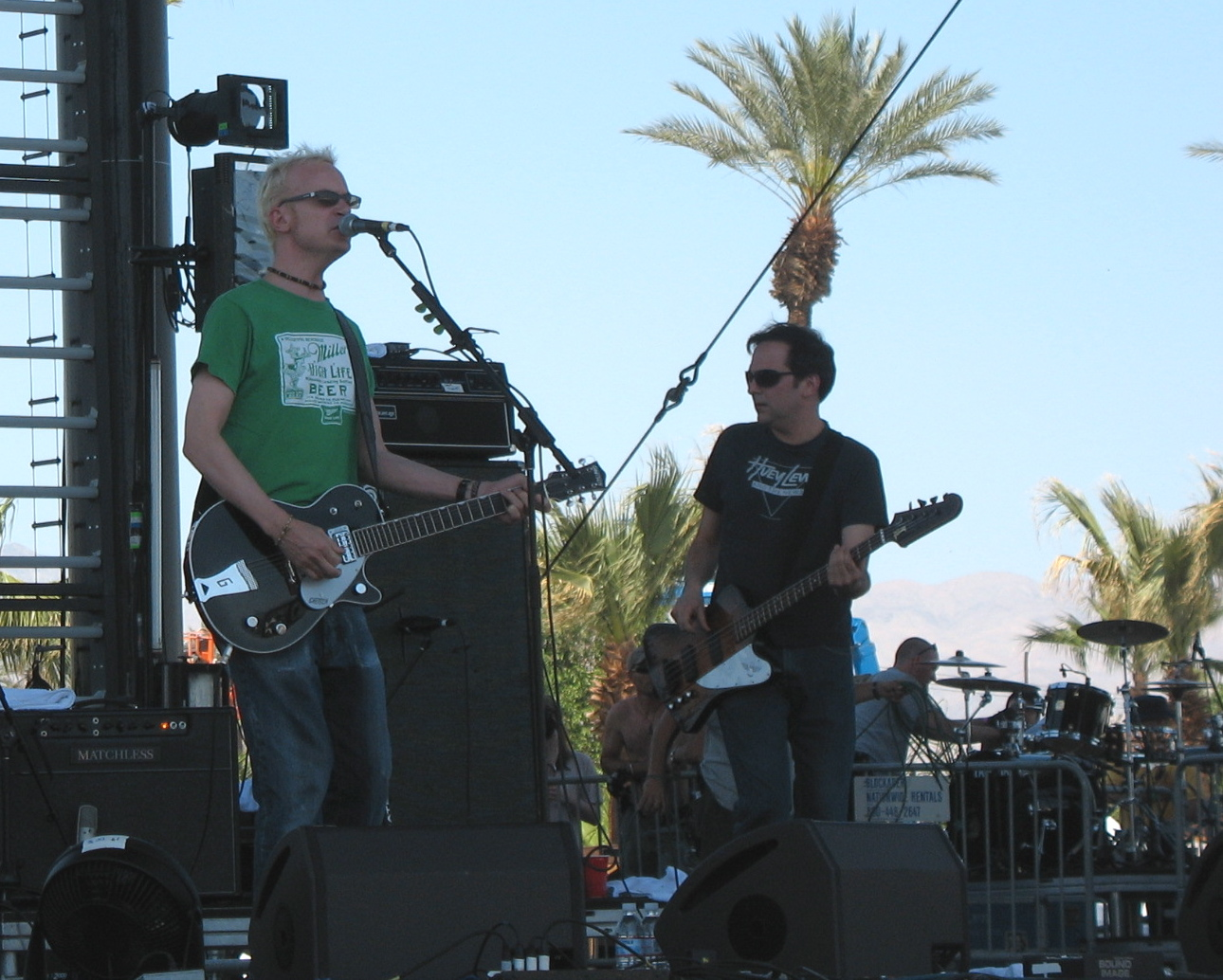
The EP includes a cover of "Hackensack" by Fountains of Wayne.

After airing more than 100 specials, in May 2009, MTV announced the relaunch of its MTV Unplugged TV series, which would feature mainstream and popular artists in an acoustic setting. Amy Doyle, the executive vice president of music and talent for MTV, stated: "Unplugged has always been a fan and artist favorite and one of the more iconic MTV performance series ever. By bringing the series to MTV.com, we're able to deliver it to a new generation of music fans and offer a greater level of access to their favorite musicians through performances, interviews and artist-chosen playlists - and it's all viewable on demand." The relaunch would also include airing "full-song and special clips from performances" on various MTV sister channels. Perry, appeared on the program during that summer.

Perry thought that it would be a great opportunity to showcase herself as an artist, as well as expressing the true meaning of her songs. She stated: "I really wanted to do MTV Unplugged, obviously, because it has such a great history of showing off really who the person is ... You get to hear the real story of the songs, which is important to me". The audience for the program was selected on a contest where fans over the age of 18 could send photos and explain why they were fans of Perry. The episode featuring Perry was recorded on July 22, 2009. For the recording, Perry was dressed in a pale pink chiffon evening gown, with flowers in her hair. She further said: "Some people have an idea who I am, a little piece of the cake, but I get to show off really more. I have a larger-than-life personality and my clothes reflect that. For MTV Unplugged, I wanted to be a mixture of Stevie Nicks and a fairy!".

MTV Unplugged consists of two discs. The first, which is a Compact Disc, contains acoustic renditions of her songs "I Kissed a Girl", "Ur So Gay", "Thinking of You", "Waking Up in Vegas", and "Lost" from One of the Boys, a cover of "Hackensack" by American power pop band Fountains of Wayne, and a new song titled "Brick by Brick". Perry explained why she chose Hackensack, saying that she related to the lyrics of "having a loyal lover [or] friend back home when she's on the road", though, directly, the song does not narrate any event of Perry's life. The versions performed incorporate lighter genres than pop rock, which is embraced in One of the Boys, like jazz and lounge music, particularly in "I Kissed a Girl". The second disc is a DVD, containing the video recording of the performance, recorded at NEP Midtown Studios, located in New York City. Aside from the live performance, it also contains an interview with the singer.

== Release and reception ==
MTV Unplugged was first released in Switzerland and the United States, respectively, in CD/DVD and digital formats, on November 17, 2009. Select songs and interviews from the EP were aired during MTV's morning block, AMTV, three days later. The physical edition was released in the United States and France on November 17, 2009. The full video recording was released, on 27 November, on the MTV official website, while the television premiere followed at 9 PM of that day, on the high-definition channel Palladia, being reaired at midnight. In Brazil, the set was released in a DVD/CD format, packaged in a keep case. The Japan release, also as a DVD/CD package, only occurred more than one year after, on November 24, 2010. The album opened at number 168 on the US Billboard 200, having dropped out from the chart on the following week. As of August 2020, it has sold 63,000 copies in the United States. It debuted at number 192 on the French Albums Chart, and higher on the Swiss Albums Chart, at number 82.

Professional ratings
Review scores
| Source | Rating |
|---|---|
| AllMusic | 3/5 stars |
| Blogcritics | Positive |
| Entertainment Weekly | D |
| The Washington Post | Positive |

Upon its release, MTV Unplugged received generally mixed reviews from music critics. AllMusic editor Stephen Thomas Erlewine gave the album three out of five stars, praising Perry for being a hard working music act and "seeming more likeable here than she did on her debut", though he wrote that her flaws were "amplified" during the performance. Sahar from Blogcritics was more positive about the set, writing that although Perry was not the "best singer out there", she made up for it "in catchiness and just plain adorableness". The contributor was more negative of the acoustic version of "I Kissed a Girl" and the fact that MTV cut out parts from the video recording: "What I'd like to have seen is for MTV to make Katy Perry enter into an unscripted dialog with the fans that are there, film the whole thing and put that on a DVD – then you will really have something unplugged. For how can you truly know an artist if we don't see such interactions?" Simon Vozick-Levinson from Entertainment Weekly gave the live album a D, opining that "the stripped-down treatment of MTV Unplugged does Perry's yowling voice no favors", and that "[the] songs just aren't solid enough to stand on their own without loads of glossy production". Catherine Lewis of The Washington Post praised Perry's "translate her more rambunctious numbers into an acoustic format" and wrote that the album was "definitely a step in a good — and unexpected — direction".

== Track listing ==
Titles are obtained from the iTunes Store; lengths are adapted from the liner notes.

MTV Unplugged – Disc 1 (CD)
| No. | Title | Writer(s) | Length |
|---|---|---|---|
| 1. | "I Kissed a Girl" | Katy Perry; Lukasz Gottwald; Max Martin; Cathy Dennis | 4:12 |
| 2. | "Ur So Gay" | Perry; Greg Wells | 4:26 |
| 3. | "Hackensack" | Chris Collingwood; Adam Schlesinger | 3:04 |
| 4. | "Thinking of You" | Perry | 4:41 |
| 5. | "Lost" | Perry; Ted Bruner | 5:01 |
| 6. | "Waking Up in Vegas" | Perry; Desmond Child; Andreas Carlsson | 3:33 |
| 7. | "Brick by Brick" | Perry; Wells | 4:39 |
| Total length: | | | 29:36 |

MTV Unplugged – Disc 2 (DVD)
| No. | Title | Length |
|---|---|---|
| 1. | "I Kissed a Girl" | 4:11 |
| 2. | "Ur So Gay" | 4:22 |
| 3. | "Hackensack" | 3:00 |
| 4. | "Thinking of You" | 4:38 |
| 5. | "Lost" | 4:59 |
| 6. | "Waking Up in Vegas" | 3:28 |
| 7. | "Brick by Brick" | 4:46 |
| 8. | "Interview" | 8:23 |
| Total length: | | 45:00 |

== Personnel ==
Credits were adapted from the album's liner notes.

Band

- Katy Perry – vocals, guitar
- Adam Marcello – musical director, drums, vocals
- Patrick Matera – guitar, backing vocals
- Joshua Moreau – bass
- Korel Tunador – guitar, piano, Wurlitzer, pump organ, toy piano, saxophone, bells, finger cymbals, vocals

Strings

- Daniel Cho – cello
- Surai Nesrine Balbeisi – viola
- K Ishibashi – violin
- Beth Meyers – violin
- Deborah Lurie – arrangement on "Thinking of You"
- Daniel Cho – arrangement on "Hackensack"
- Chris Garcia – additional vocal production

Horns

- David Luther – tenor sax, Wurlitzer
- Kenny Rampton – trumpet

Crew

- Julia Ervin – tour manager
- Fern Alvarez – production manager
- Kim Hilton – tour coordinator
- Angela Hudson – tour assistant
- Bobby Sepulveda – stage manager
- Ryan Johnson – monitor engineer
- Steve Luna – guitar tech
- Todd Delano – make-up
- Aaron Light – hair
- Johnny Wujek – stylist
- Josh Leibman – stylist assistant

== Charts ==
| Chart (2009) | Peak position |
|---|---|
| Australian Music DVDs (ARIA) | 13 |
| French Albums (SNEP) | 192 |
| Swiss Albums (Schweizer Hitparade) | 82 |
| US Billboard 200 | 168 |

== Release history ==
Release dates and formats for MTV Unplugged
| Country | Date | Format | Label | Ref. |
|---|---|---|---|---|
| Switzerland | November 17, 2009 | CD/DVD | Capitol; EMI | |
| United States | November 17, 2009 | Digital download | Capitol; EMI | |
| United States | November 17, 2009 | CD/DVD | Capitol; EMI | |
| France | November 17, 2009 | CD/DVD | Capitol; EMI | |
| Japan | November 24, 2010 | DVD/CD | EMI Music Japan | |
| United States | April 5, 2025 | Vinyl | Universal | |
