= Ur So Gay (EP) =

EP by Katy Perry
- Released: November 20, 2007
- Length: 16:51
- Label: Capitol
- Producers: Ted Bruner; Ray Martin; Junior Sanchez; Greg Wells

Katy Perry chronology
Katy Hudson (2001)	Ur So Gay (2007)	One of the Boys (2008)

Ur So Gay is the debut extended play (EP) by American singer-songwriter Katy Perry. It was released digitally on November 20, 2007 by Capitol Records. A physical edition of the EP was released on January 15, 2008. The EP contains four tracks: the title track "Ur So Gay", a remix of the title track by American DJ Junior Sanchez, "Use Your Love" (a remake of the Outfield's 1986 song "Your Love"), and "Lost". "Ur So Gay" and "Lost" would later appear on Perry's second studio album, One of the Boys (2008).

== Music ==
According to Perry, she had a couple of different choices in mind for covers. She initially wanted to record a Queen song, but could not think of one that was particularly club-worthy. While at a club with her friends, the Outfield's song "Your Love" was played. Perry said that when the song came on, every girl there went onto the dance floor and had "the best time", which is something that she wanted to capture on the EP.

== Release ==
The EP was not expected to be a huge seller and only "a few thousand" copies were sold. According to Chris Anokute, Perry's A&R, the EP "did well in terms of building a press story but because people didn't run to iTunes to buy the EP some executives in the company started backpedalling".

== Critical reception ==
Billboard senior editor Chuck Taylor believed that Ur So Gay had "all the potential to amuse the masses". He further highlighted the remix of its title track, referring to this as "ripe and ready for clubs—where gays are bound to embrace it".

== Track listing ==
Ur So Gay – Standard edition
No.	Title	Writer(s)	Producer(s)	Length
1.	"Ur So Gay"	Katy Perry; Greg Wells	Wells	3:39
2.	"Ur So Gay" (remix)	Perry; Wells	Wells; Junior Sanchez	5:54
3.	"Use Your Love"	John Spinks; Perry	Sanchez; Ray Martin	3:03
4.	"Lost"	Perry; Ted Bruner	Bruner	4:20
Total length:				16:51

Vinyl edition
No.	Title	Writer(s)	Producer(s)	Length
5.	"Ur So Gay" (instrumental)	Perry; Wells	Wells	3:38
6.	"Ur So Gay" (instrumental remix)	Perry; Wells	Wells; Sanchez	5:55
7.	"Ur So Gay" (a capella)	Perry; Wells	Wells	3:15
Total length:				29:39

== Release history ==
Release dates and formats for Ur So Gay
Region	Date	Format	Label	Ref.
United States	November 20, 2007	Digital download	Capitol	
United States	March 28, 2008	Vinyl	Capitol	
