= Ur So Gay =

2007 song by Katy Perry

Promotional single by Katy Perry

from the EP Ur So Gay and the album One of the Boys
- Released: November 20, 2007
- Recorded: 2007
- Studio: Rocket Carousel Studio (Los Angeles, California)
- Genre: Trip hop; electropop; pop rock
- Length: 3:39
- Label: Capitol
- Songwriters: Katy Perry; Greg Wells
- Producer: Greg Wells

Music video
- "Ur So Gay" on YouTube

"Ur So Gay" is a song released by American singer Katy Perry from her 2007 extended play (EP) of the same name, through Capitol Records. She co-wrote the song with its producer, Greg Wells, while Drew Pearson served as the track's engineer. The song was recorded at Rocket Carousel Studio in Los Angeles, California in 2007, and was first released as a promotional single from an EP of the same name (alongside a remix by Junior Sanchez) that same year. "Ur So Gay" was later included on Perry's second studio album, One of the Boys (2008). The song was released through Capitol Records, and is a trip hop, electropop, and pop rock song about sex.

Commercially, "Ur So Gay" charted at number 146 on the ARIA Singles Chart, while topping the US Billboard Hot Dance Singles Sales. The song has been certified Platinum in Brazil and Gold in the United States. A music video for the song was also made, directed by Walter May and released in November 2007. "Ur So Gay" would later be featured on Perry's MTV Unplugged set (2009).

== Background and composition ==
When asked about the song, Perry and her mother said it was about sex. The song "wasn't meant to be a big single or show what the album is going to be all about. That was for my Internet bloggers, so I'm not coming out of nowhere." Perry's A&R representative Chris Anokute confirmed this by saying that they had no plans for radio coverage but just wanted to put this "novelty" song out online as an introduction to see "what the attraction was". As expected, sales were low, but Anokute said the track did well in terms of building a press story. Due to the song's content, there was concern from the label over commercially releasing "Ur So Gay".

"Ur So Gay" moves at a moderate pace. The song is written in the key of E minor and the tempo is at 80 beats per minute. Perry's vocal's in "Ur So Gay" span from the lower note of E_{3} to the higher note of D_{#5}.

== Critical reception ==
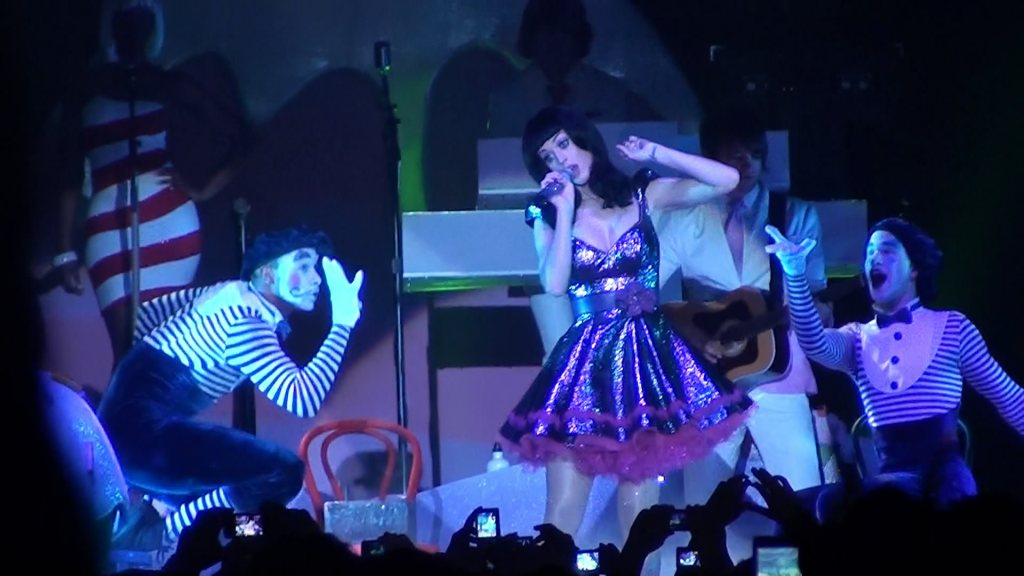
Perry performing "Ur So Gay" on the California Dreams Tour

The song's lyrics have been described in a positive review as "eighteen different kinds of wrong". The song itself has been described as an "emo-bashing anthem that's either horribly homophobic, a sly piece of social commentary or, possibly, both". The Tampa Bay Times wrote that the "boyfriend-skewering..... isn't homophobic, but it does pummel straight guys who can't handle her edge". Billboard senior editor Chuck Taylor believed the song "has all the potential to amuse the masses," further commenting that the song is "just too good" for top 40 programmers to not play.

Some critics, however, concluded that the song was homophobic. Ugo.com says the song settles for "catchphrase-homophobia" while AllMusic describes the lyrics as "gay-baiting". Writing for Glamour in 2020, Christopher Rosa called the track Perry's worst song. He criticized its "offensive queer tropes" and found its lyrics problematic.

== Commercial performance ==
In the United States, "Ur So Gay" topped the Billboard Hot Dance Singles Sales for the week ending June 14, 2008. It also charted at number two on the Billboard Hot Singles Sales. The song was later certified Gold by the Recording Industry Association of America (RIAA) for equivalent sales of 500,000 units in the US. In Australia, "Ur So Gay" peaked at number 146 on the ARIA Singles Chart during the chart dated July 7, 2008.

== Music video ==
=== Background ===
The video was directed by Walter May and released in November 2007. According to senior vice president of A&R at Capitol Records Bob Semanovich, the purpose of the video was to introduce Perry to audiences in a way that was "fun and playful". Perry conceived the idea to center the video around dolls, as she wanted audiences to know that the song was meant as a "tongue-in-cheek dis[s] track".

=== Synopsis ===
In the video, Perry plays the song in front of a bright cartoon-like background with clouds that have smiley faces on them. The characters in the video are played by Fashion Royalty dolls. At the end of the video, the clouds had sad faces on them because of Perry's lyrics.

== Live performances ==
Perry performed the song as part of her MTV Unplugged set, released on 13 November 2009. The song was also performed on Perry's Hello Katy Tour (for One of the Boys) and her California Dreams Tour (for Teenage Dream).

== Credits and personnel ==
Credits and personnel adapted from the One of the Boys album liner notes.

- Katy Perry – writer, vocals, whistles
- Greg Wells – writer, producer, piano, guitar, bass, beats
- Drew Pearson – recording at Rocket Carousel Studio (Los Angeles)
- Joe Zook – mixing at Aus Studios (Studio City)
- Jerry Hey – horn section, horn arrangement
- Gary Grant – horn section
- Bill Reichenbach – horn section
- Dan Higgins – horn section

== Charts ==
Chart performance for "Ur So Gay"
Chart (2008)	Peak position
Australia (ARIA)	146
US Hot Singles Sales (Billboard)	2
US Hot Dance Singles Sales (Billboard)	1

== Certifications and sales ==
Certifications for "Ur So Gay"
Region	Certification	Certified units/sales
Brazil (Pro-Música Brasil)	Platinum	60,000^{*}
United States (RIAA)	Gold	500,000^{‡}
^{*} Sales figures based on certification alone.^{‡} Sales+streaming figures based on certification alone.

== See also ==
- List of Billboard number-one dance singles of 2008
