= One of the Boys =

Studio album by Katy Perry
- Released: June 17, 2008
- Studios: Butch's old house (Los Feliz, California); Deathstar Studios (Los Angeles, California); Dr. Luke's Studios (New York City, New York); Legacy Recording Studios (New York City, New York); Conway Recording Studios (Los Angeles, California); Rocket Carousel Studios (Los Angeles, California); Freshkills (New York City, New York); Rondor Studios (Los Angeles, California); Capitol Studios (Hollywood, California); The Compound (Los Feliz, California); UMPG Studios (Los Angeles, California); Aerowave Studios (Encino, California); Unstable Studios (Surrey); Monster Island (New York City, New York); The Earth's Core (Glasgow)
- Genres: Pop rock; power pop; soft rock
- Length: 43:36
- Label: Capitol
- Producers: Katy Perry; Greg Wells; Dr. Luke; Glen Ballard; Dave Stewart; Butch Walker; S*A*M and Sluggo; Ted Bruner

Katy Perry chronology
Ur So Gay (2007)	One of the Boys (2008)	MTV Unplugged (2009)

Singles from One of the Boys
- 1. "I Kissed a Girl" Released: April 28, 2008; 2. "Hot n Cold" Released: September 9, 2008; 3. "Thinking of You" Released: January 12, 2009; 4. "Waking Up in Vegas" Released: April 21, 2009

One of the Boys is the second studio album by the American singer-songwriter Katy Perry. It was released on June 17, 2008, through Capitol Records. Perry worked with producers including Butch Walker, Dr. Luke, Benny Blanco, Greg Wells, S*A*M and Sluggo, Ted Bruner, Scott Cutler, Anne Preven, and Dave Stewart. It was preceded by her debut extended play (EP) Ur So Gay in 2007.

One of the Boys is Perry's first album under the stage name Katy Perry, following her debut studio album, Katy Hudson (2001), which was released under her real name on Red Hill Records. One of the Boys received mixed reception from critics, with some deeming it as being filled with "potential hits" and others criticizing the material they perceived to be weak. Commercially, it charted within the top ten in Argentina, Austria, Canada, Denmark, France, Germany, Ireland, Mexico, Norway, Switzerland, and the United States. One of the Boys earned Perry two Grammy Award nominations, and has sold seven million copies worldwide. It has been certified multi-platinum in Australia, Canada, Chile, Denmark, France, New Zealand, Norway, the United Kingdom, and the United States.

The album's lead single and Perry's debut single, "I Kissed a Girl", became Perry's first US Billboard Hot 100 number-one single and the 1,000th number-one rock song on the chart. Its second single, "Hot n Cold", reached number three in the United States, while topping the charts in Germany, Canada, the Netherlands, and Austria, among others. The third single, "Thinking of You", reached the top-thirty in the US, while the fourth and final single, "Waking Up in Vegas", became a top ten hit and her third top ten hit overall. To further promote the album, Perry embarked on two concert tours: the 2008 Warped Tour and her first solo world tour, the Hello Katy Tour.

== Background ==
Perry's change in record label, and adoption of a pseudonymous surname accompanied a shift from the Christian rock of her debut album Katy Hudson. The singer stated that she had been working on the album since she was eighteen years old. During the making of the album, Perry signed to and was dropped from a joint-venture between Java Records and Island Def Jam, and Columbia Records, without releasing any singles or a project from either. The original titles for the album were Katy Perry and Fingerprints during this period.

Several unused songs from the original recording sessions were eventually given to other artists after Perry's success, such as "I Do Not Hook Up" and "Long Shot" going to Kelly Clarkson, "Breakout" and "The Driveway" going to Miley Cyrus, and "Rock God" and "That's More Like It" going to Selena Gomez & the Scene. Perry has stated she had written close to a hundred songs in preparation of an album release.

Perry collaborated with producers Greg Wells, Dr. Luke, Dave Stewart, and Max Martin among others on One of the Boys. Perry co-wrote every song on the album, as well as writing three entirely by herself, including the title track, "Mannequin", and "Thinking of You", which Perry wrote back in 2002, a year after Katy Hudson released.

Once signed to Capitol, label head Jason Flom started studio sessions between Perry, Dr. Luke, and Max Martin, where they created "I Kissed a Girl" and "Hot n Cold". Perry felt either of the songs would have been a strong lead single for the album, but eventually chose "I Kissed a Girl" as a more notable track. Perry then collaborated again with Greg Wells, creating the songs "Ur So Gay" and "Mannequin". According to Perry's A&R Chris Anokute, they ended up with five new songs and then chose six songs from previously shelved sessions to compile One of the Boys. When talking about the songs on the album Perry said that she released the promotional single "Ur So Gay" as an introduction to the album:

The album will have a lot of the same characteristics [as "Ur So Gay"], though. There will be lots of storytelling, because lyrics are important to me. There are a few songs that will make you cry, but there are others to make you dance and sing. Every song is on the album for a specific reason.

== Music and lyrics ==
=== Themes and influences ===
Although Perry's musical style and way of composing ironic and bawdy songs has been heavily compared to the style of singers Avril Lavigne and Lily Allen, the singer was influenced by Queen and Freddie Mercury in particular. All songs on the album were written by Perry, assisted by musicians Greg Wells, Max Martin, Dr. Luke, Cathy Dennis, Desmond Child, Andreas Carlsson, Sam Hollander, Dave Katz, S*A*M and Sluggo, Ted Bruner, Scott Cutler, Anne Preven, Dave Stewart, and Glen Ballard. The album includes several tracks that tell stories — a balance of sad songs and happier tunes. About these opposites, she said, "I think people can appreciate a songwriter who shows different sides..... I've put everything into [this album] and I feel like it's my baby." Its primary sound is pop, in the styles of pop rock, power pop, soft rock, and teen pop, with inflections of pop-punk.

=== Songs ===
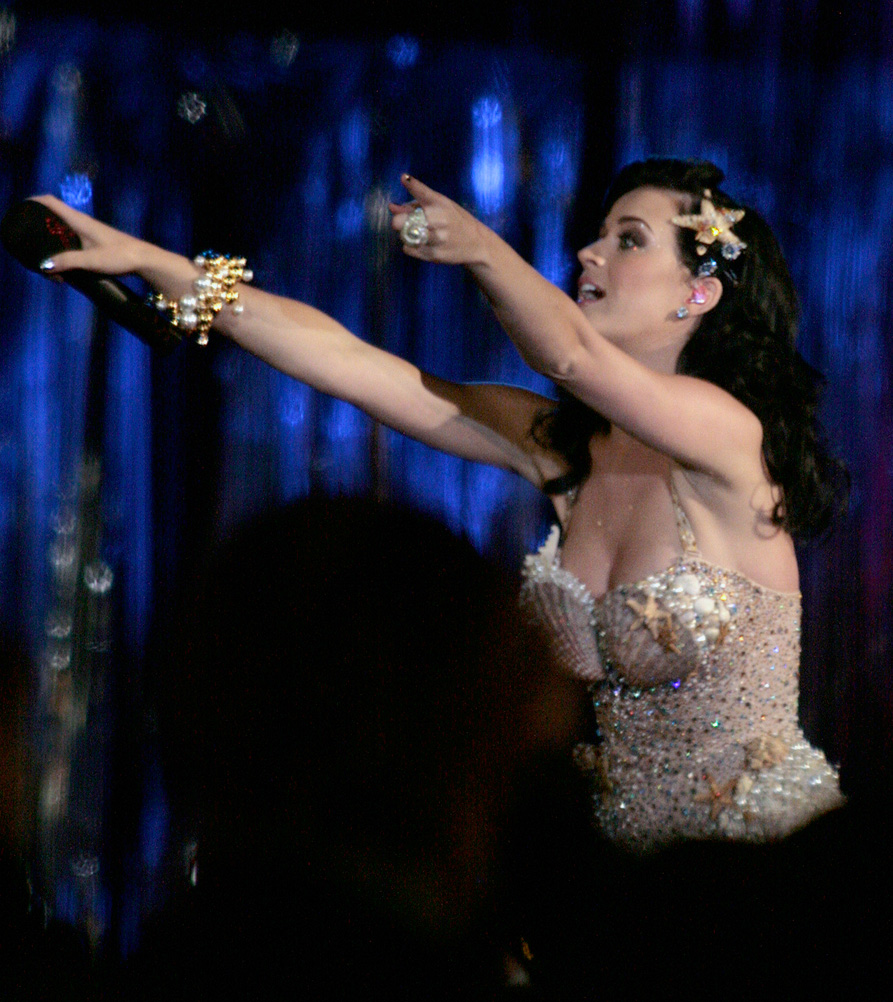
Perry performing "I Kissed a Girl" at the Life Ball in May 2009 in Vienna, Austria

The opening track is the title track "One of the Boys", where Perry express that she does not want to "be one of the boys of her love interest", describing the song, Charles A. Hohman from PopMatters noted that "she used to belch the alphabet and tape down her tits, but one summer, the tomboy lifestyle just didn't hold her interest, so she started 'studying Lolita religiously' and noticing guys noticing her." The song was inspired by "Confessions of a Teenage Girl" by Bonnie McKee, who after meeting Perry at a thrift shop became her friend and collaborator. Its second track is the lead single "I Kissed a Girl", which generated some controversy, and dealt with the subject of lesbianism. The song was inspired by actress Scarlett Johansson. Musically, it is a pop rock track. It contains influences of new wave and runs through a throbbing beat and an organic instrumental thump, according to About.com's Bill Lamb. The track features instrumentation provided by drums, guitars and bass. The song sparked controversy for its homosexual themes. The album's third song is "Waking Up In Vegas". The song deals with trips with friends to Las Vegas. "Thinking of You" is the first ballad of the album. It is a downtempo pop rock song, as the singer reflects on settling for the second best: "You said move on, where do I go?"/"I guess second best, it is all I will know", she sings. Reviewing the song, editor CT from Billboard described it as "a mid-'90s No Doubt pop/rock palette".

In the fifth track, "Mannequin," Perry critiques a stoic man, singing "You're not a man, you're just a mannequin!" Rolling Stone's Nicole Frehsee compared "Mannequin" to 1980s Cher songs. "Ur So Gay" was composed as a tool of revenge by the singer on her ex-boyfriend, where Perry satirizes his exaggerated emo style and metrosexual attitude. It is a trip hop track with a moderate tempo. In the seventh track "Hot n Cold", Perry discusses the theme of uncertainty and the ups and downs of relationships. It is a synthpop song which utilizes guitars and synthesizers. "If You Can Afford Me" cops a mixed message about female materialism. Sal Cinquemani from Slant Magazine compared the song with Madonna's song "Material Girl" (1984). "Lost" and "I'm Still Breathing" are both ballads, in the latter, she sings: "I leave the gas on/Walk the alleys in the dark", the verse use a metaphor for a dying relationship.

== Release and promotion ==
The album was first released on June 17, 2008. It was released in separate editions: the standard edition, the Australian Tour edition, which contains the standard CD plus a bonus CD (which was also released as a separate EP on the Australian iTunes Store) containing an acoustic version of "Thinking of You" and remixes, the special edition, which is packaged in a digipak and contains four bonus tracks, and the Japanese re-issue. The European, Japanese, and iTunes editions of the album all contain bonus tracks.

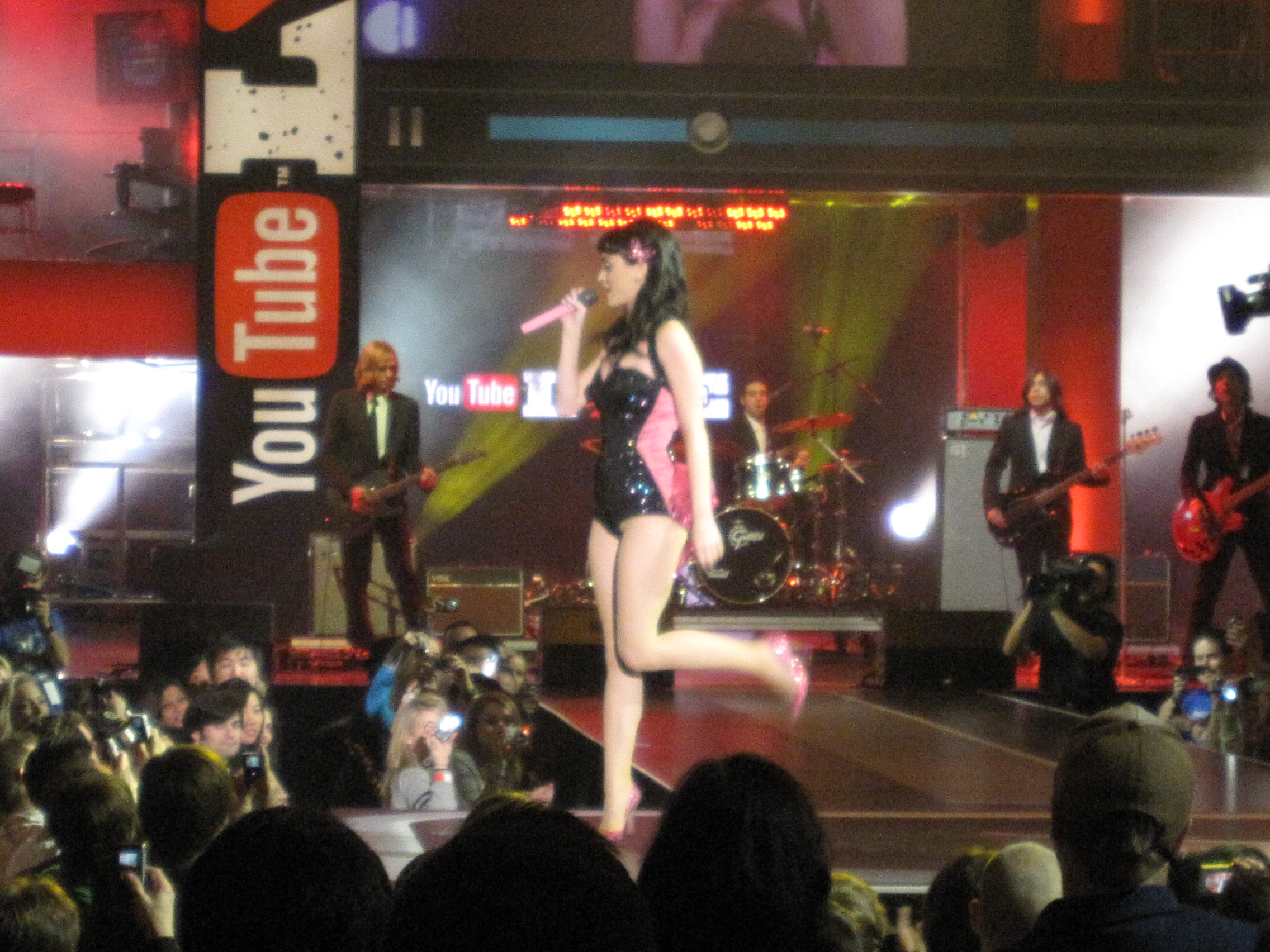
Perry performing the opening act for YouTube Live in 2008

Upon its release, the singer had been heavily criticized for her song, "Ur So Gay", considered by the site The New Gay to be homophobic. The author of the publication added, "It's time for Katy Perry to stop talking nonsense" because "the song trots out a number of tired gay stereotypes to condemn one of Perry's ex-boyfriends and includes a paradoxical chorus". Jane Czyzselska from The Guardian commented that "Perry's song is a rather sweet, refreshing antidote to the avalanche of overtly sexualized boy-grinds-girl songs." She promoted the song in Portugal, and it was not very well received by the public. Her first single, "I Kissed a Girl", became a worldwide controversy. Despite the context, Perry mentioned several times that she does not define herself as heterosexual. She has been strongly criticized by the LGBT community, who believe that the singer used music to make money and not on behalf of homosexuals, and by critics who claimed that music leads the girls to be lesbian. The song was criticized by the local headquarters of the evangelical Havens Corners Church, which has set the following sentence in its garden in September 2008: "I kissed a girl and liked it. So I went to hell." To promote the album Perry embarked on three tours: the Warped Tour 2008, her first solo world tour, the Hello Katy Tour, with 89 shows performed, and No Doubt's Summer Tour 2009 as its opening act.

== Singles ==
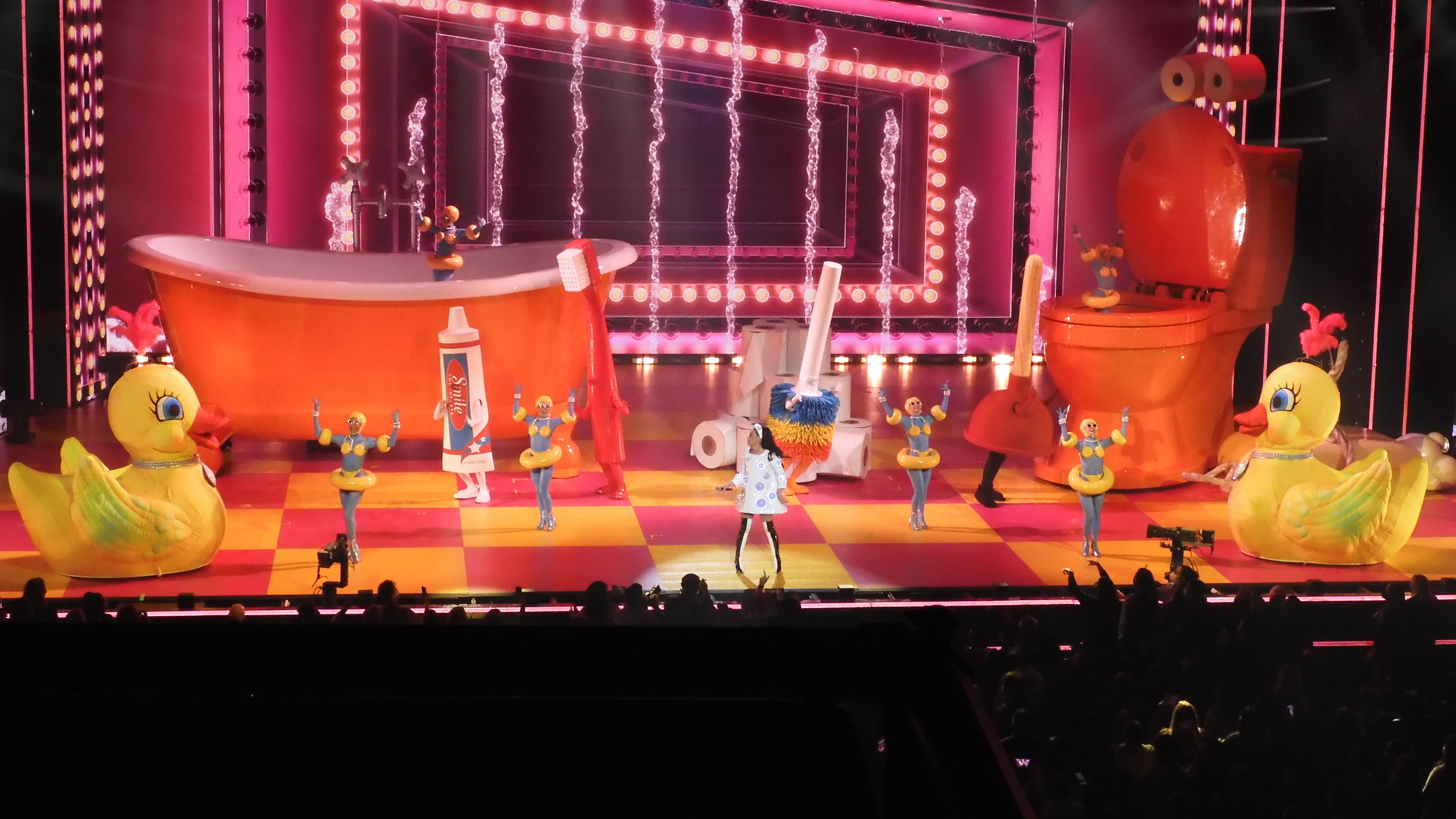
Perry performing "Waking Up in Vegas" during her Play residency

The album's lead single, "I Kissed a Girl" was released in late April and subsequently soared up the charts. "I Kissed a Girl" was a commercial success. It topped the Billboard Hot 100 chart, becoming the 1000th chart-topper of the rock era. The song has since become a major worldwide hit, and along with the United States, it has topped the charts in more than twenty countries, including Australia, Canada, Ireland, and the United Kingdom.

The second single, "Hot n Cold", made it onto the chart after the album came out due to digital downloads. It was released as a single in early September, and peaked at number three on the US charts, making it Perry's second consecutive top five single. On November 14, the song became Perry's first number one on radio airplay. It is officially one of the ten best-selling digitally downloaded songs of all time after its initial run.

"Thinking of You", the penultimate single, was originally planned to be the first single from the album, but was scrapped for "I Kissed a Girl" due to latter song's surge in popularity. "Thinking of You" received a video in late April 2008, but the video was removed from YouTube and replaced by a new video after the single was re-released as the third international single from the album. Perry shot the second video with director Melina Matsoukas in the first week of December 2008. The video for the single was released on December 23, 2008. The track peaked at number twenty-nine on the Billboard Hot 100 on the week of February 12, 2009 where it remained for the next two weeks before declining to number thirty-one in its seventh week on the chart.

"Waking Up in Vegas" is the fourth and final single from the album. It went for radio adds on April 21, 2009, in the US. It was released to Australian radio on March 23, 2009, where it became the fourth most added song in its release week. Perry performed it on American Idol in May, resulting in a surge of sales for the song. The music video was shot by Joseph Kahn during March 2009 in Las Vegas and officially premiered on the iTunes Store in the US, and Australia on April 28, 2009. It peaked at number nine on the Billboard Hot 100, becoming the third top-ten single from the album.

=== Promotional singles and other songs ===
"Ur So Gay" was released as the album's sole promotional single on November 20, 2007. It was released on the exact same day as Perry's debut EP of the same name, which included the track, alongside a remix from Junior Sanchez and instrumental and a cappella versions of the track on the vinyl edition. The song itself would chart within the top 10 of the Hot Singles Sales chart and the Dance/Electronic Singles Sales chart, peaking at the top of the latter chart. It also charted at number 146 on the ARIA Charts, and was certified Gold by the Recording Industry Association of America (RIAA) and Platinum by Pro-Música Brasil (PMB), respectively equivalent to units of 500,000 and 60,000.

Two other non-singles from the album would also chart. The first, the title track, charted at number 40 on Australia's ARIA Charts. The second, "If You Can Afford Me", charted at number 28 on New Zealand's Official Aotearoa Music Charts. Two remixes of "I Kissed a Girl" would also chart, one by Jason Nevins and another by Norman and Attalla. The former charted at number 104 on the CIS Airplay chart in Russia and peaked at number 94 on the Russian Singles Chart. The latter charted at number 124 on the Ukrainian Singles Chart.

== Critical reception ==
Professional ratings
Aggregate scores
Source	Rating
Metacritic	47/100
Review scores
Source	Rating
AllMusic	3.5/5 stars
The A.V. Club	D−
Blender	3.5/5 stars
The Guardian	2/5 stars
NOW	2/5 stars
Rolling Stone	2/5 stars
PopMatters	4/10
Slant Magazine	2/5 stars
Spin	3/10
Uncut	3/5 stars

One of the Boys received mixed reviews from critics. On Metacritic, which assigns a normalized rating out of 100 to reviews from mainstream critics, the album has received a score of 47, citing "mixed or average reviews". A highly positive review came from Kerri Mason of Billboard, who felt it was "packed with potential hits." Blender argued, "Perry's creative-writing-class punch lines don't always justify her self-congratulatory drag-queen tone. But she hiccups quirkily enough, and myriad big-name producers (from Dr. Luke to Glen Ballard) keep the new-wave synth hooks hopping."

Stephen Thomas Erlewine of AllMusic initially gave the album two out of five stars, remarking it "sinks to crass, craven depths that turn One of the Boys into a grotesque emblem of all the wretched excesses of this decade"; however, the rating was eventually upgraded to 3 and a 1/2 out of 5. Uncut wrote, "Gwen Stefani should be nervous", while Sal Cinquemani of Slant Magazine criticized Perry's vocal performances, and compared the title track to "No Doubt's 'Just a Girl' sans personality and conviction". Alex Miller of NME discouraged music consumers with "even a passing interest in actually enjoying a record" from buying it. Robert Christgau gave the album a two-star honorable mention in his Consumer Guide review, naming "I Kissed a Girl" and "One of the Boys" as highlights while writing, "She stopped taping her 'suckers' down, and kissing her girlfriend was just an experiment, but trumpeting her vulnerability she's as loud and laddish as a hockey fan".

== Commercial performance ==
One of the Boys debuted at number nine on the US Billboard 200, with 47,000 copies sold in its first week of release. The record became Perry's third-longest charting album, remaining on the Billboard 200 for 92 weeks. According to Nielsen Music, the album has sold 1.73 million copies in the United States as of August 2020. One of the Boys was later certified three-times Platinum by the Recording Industry Association of America (RIAA) for moving three million album-equivalent units in the country.

In the United Kingdom, One of the Boys peaked at number 11 on the UK Albums Chart and has sold 758,410 copies as of May 2026. It was later certified two-times Platinum by the British Phonographic Industry (BPI). Elsewhere, One of the Boys reached the top 10 in Argentina, Austria, Canada, Denmark, France, Germany, Ireland, Mexico, Norway, and Switzerland. The album has been certified five-times Platinum in Canada, three-times Platinum in Australia and Chile, two-times Platinum in Denmark, France, New Zealand, and Norway, and Platinum in Austria, Ireland, and Italy. According to the International Federation of the Phonographic Industry (IFPI), One of the Boys was the 33rd highest-selling album of 2008. It has sold seven million copies worldwide as of August 2010.

== Accolades ==
=== Awards and nominations ===
Awards and nominations for One of the Boys
Award	Category	Nominee(s)	Result	Ref.
ASCAP Pop Music Awards	Most Performed Song	"I Kissed a Girl"	Won	
ASCAP Pop Music Awards	Most Performed Song	"Hot n Cold"	Won	
ASCAP Pop Music Awards	Most Performed Song	"Hot n Cold"	Won	
ASCAP Pop Music Awards	Most Performed Song	"Waking Up in Vegas"	Won	
Eska Music Awards	Best Selling Album	One of the Boys	Won	
Grammy Awards	Best Female Pop Vocal Performance	"I Kissed a Girl"	Nominated	
Grammy Awards	Best Female Pop Vocal Performance	"Hot n Cold"	Nominated	
Los Premios MTV Latinoamérica	Song of the Year	"I Kissed a Girl"	Nominated	
Los Premios MTV Latinoamérica	Best Ringtone	"Hot n Cold"	Won	
MTV Europe Music Awards	Most Addictive Track	"I Kissed a Girl"	Nominated	
MTV Europe Music Awards	Best Video	"Waking Up in Vegas"	Nominated	
MTV Video Music Awards	Best Art Direction	"I Kissed a Girl"	Nominated	
MTV Video Music Awards	Best Cinematography	"I Kissed a Girl"	Nominated	
MTV Video Music Awards	Best Editing	"I Kissed a Girl"	Nominated	
MTV Video Music Awards	Best New Artist	"I Kissed a Girl"	Nominated	
MTV Video Music Awards	Best Female Video	"I Kissed a Girl"	Nominated	
MTV Video Music Awards	Best Female Video	"Hot n Cold"	Nominated	
MTV Video Music Awards Japan	Best Pop Video	"I Kissed a Girl"	Won	
Much Music Video Awards	UR Fave: International Artist	"I Kissed a Girl"	Nominated	
Much Music Video Awards	International Video of the Year – Artist	"Hot n Cold"	Nominated	
Much Music Video Awards	International Video of the Year – Artist	"Waking Up In Vegas"	Nominated	
Music Video Production Awards	Video of the Year	"Waking Up In Vegas"	Won	
Nickelodeon Kids' Choice Awards	Favorite Song	"I Kissed a Girl"	Nominated	
NRJ Awards	International Album of the Year	One of the Boys	Won	
People's Choice Awards	Favorite Pop Song	"I Kissed a Girl"	Won	
The Record of the Year	The Record of the Year	"I Kissed a Girl"	Nominated	
Teen Choice Awards	Choice Music: Summer Song	"I Kissed a Girl"	Nominated	
Teen Choice Awards	Choice Music: Single by a Female Artist	"Hot n Cold"	Nominated	
Teen Choice Awards	Choice Music: Album (Female Artist)	One of the Boys	Nominated	

=== Listicles ===
Publication	Accolade	Rank	Ref.
Blender	Top 33 Albums of 2008	19	
Complex	The 50 Best Pop Album Covers of the Past Five Years	16	

== Track listing ==
Standard edition
No.	Title	Writer(s)	Producer(s)	Length
1.	"One of the Boys"	Katy Perry	Butch Walker	4:07
2.	"I Kissed a Girl"	Perry; Lukasz Gottwald; Max Martin; Cathy Dennis	Dr. Luke; Benny Blanco^{[a]}	3:00
3.	"Waking Up in Vegas"	Perry; Desmond Child; Andreas Carlsson	Greg Wells; Perry	3:20
4.	"Thinking of You"	Perry	Walker	4:06
5.	"Mannequin"	Perry	Wells	3:17
6.	"Ur So Gay"	Perry; Wells	Wells	3:37
7.	"Hot n Cold"	Perry; Gottwald; Martin	Dr. Luke; Blanco^{[a]}	3:40
8.	"If You Can Afford Me"	Perry; Dave Katz; Sam Hollander	S*A*M and Sluggo	3:19
9.	"Lost"	Perry; Ted Bruner	Bruner	4:15
10.	"Self Inflicted"	Perry; Scott Cutler; Anne Preven	Cutler; Preven	3:25
11.	"I'm Still Breathing"	Perry; David Stewart	Stewart	3:48
12.	"Fingerprints"	Perry; Wells	Wells	3:44
Total length:				43:38

15th Anniversary edition
No.	Title	Writer(s)	Producer(s)	Length
13.	"A Cup of Coffee" (2023 remaster)	Perry; Glen Ballard; Matthew Thiessen	Ballard	4:16
14.	"I Think I'm Ready" (2023 remaster)	Perry; Bruner	Bruner	2:36
Total length:				50:30

=== Notes ===
- ^{^[a]} signifies an additional producer
- ^{^[b]} signifies a remixer
- "A Cup of Coffee" was initially available exclusively on the Walmart special, France digital and Japanese edition.
- "I Think I'm Ready" was initially available exclusively on the North American iTunes Store, International digital special and Asian digital edition
- International and Japanese edition include the rock remix of "I Kissed a Girl".
- International iTunes Store deluxe edition includes the bonus music video of "I Kissed a Girl".
- Asian special edition includes the Manhattan Clique remix radio edit of "Hot n Cold", the Morgan Page remix of "I Kissed a Girl" and the music videos of "I Kissed a Girl", "Hot n Cold", and "Thinking of You".
- Platinum Australian tour edition includes the EP The Hello Katy Australian Tour as a bonus disc.
- 2LP edition includes a bonus disc which features four remixes of "I Kissed a Girl" and four remixes of "Hot n Cold".

== Personnel ==
=== Musicians ===
- Katy Perry – lead vocals (all tracks), whistles (track 6), piano (11)
- Darren Dodd – drums (tracks 1, 4)
- Dan Chase – keyboards, programming (tracks 1, 4)
- Butch Walker – instrumentation (tracks 1, 4)
- Dr. Luke – guitars, bass guitar, drums, programming (tracks 2, 7)
- Benny Blanco – programming (tracks 2, 7), drums (7)
- Cathy Dennis – background vocals (track 2)
- Steven Wolf – live drums (track 2)
- Greg Wells – all instruments (tracks 3, 5, 12); piano, guitar, bass guitar, beats (6)
- Jerry Hey – horns (track 6)
- Gary Grant – horns (track 6)
- Bill Reichenbach – horns (track 6)
- Dan Higgins – horns (track 6)
- Max Martin – guitars (track 7)
- Sean Gould – guitars (track 8)
- Dave Katz – guitars, programming (track 8)
- Sam Hollander – programming (track 8)
- Josh Freese – drums (tracks 9, 10)
- Ted Bruner – instrumentation (track 9)
- Paul Bushnell – bass guitar (track 10)
- Dave Levita – guitar (track 10)
- Scott Cutler – guitar (track 10)
- Ned Douglas – programming (track 11)
- Jeff Bova – additional programming (track 11)
- David A. Stewart – guitar, instrumentation (track 11)

=== Technical ===
- Brian "Big Bass" Gardner – mastering
- Joe Zook – mixing (tracks 1, 3, 4, 6, 8–11)
- Serban Ghenea – mixing (tracks 2, 7)
- Greg Wells – mixing (track 5), engineering (3, 5, 12)
- Paul Hager – engineering (tracks 1, 4)
- Emily Wright – engineering (tracks 2, 7)
- Sam Holland – engineering (tracks 2, 7)
- Nick Banns – engineering (tracks 2, 7)
- Tina Kennedy – engineering (tracks 2, 7)
- Mike Caffrey – engineering, drum recording, additional drum production (track 2)
- Aniella Gottwald – engineering (track 2)
- Luke Tozour – engineering (track 5)
- Drew Pearson – engineering (track 6)
- Tatiana Gottwald – engineering (track 7)
- Sean Gould – engineering (track 8)
- Ted Bruner – engineering (track 9)
- Doug Boehm – engineering (track 10)
- Ned Douglas – engineering (track 11)
- Bill Malina – engineering (track 11)
- John Hanes – mix engineering (tracks 2, 7)
- Mike Fennell – drum engineering (track 9)
- Tim Roberts – mix engineering assistance (tracks 2, 7)
- Kitty Purry – engineering assistance (track 2)
- Jerry Hey – horn arrangement (track 6)

=== Visuals ===
- Michael Elins – photography
- Ed Sherman – art direction
- Shayne Ivy – design, illustration

Credits adapted from album liner notes.

== Charts ==
=== Weekly charts ===
Chart (2008–2009)	Peak position
Argentine Albums (CAPIF)	5
Australian Albums (ARIA)	11
Austrian Albums (Ö3 Austria)	6
Belgian Albums (Ultratop Flanders)	24
Belgian Albums (Ultratop Wallonia)	23
Canadian Albums (Billboard)	6
Czech Albums (ČNS IFPI)	33
Danish Albums (Hitlisten)	4
Dutch Albums (Album Top 100)	32
Finnish Albums (Suomen virallinen lista)	13
French Albums (SNEP)	10
German Albums (Offizielle Top 100)	7
Greek Albums (IFPI)	11
Greek International Albums (IFPI)	7
Hungarian Albums (MAHASZ)	37
Irish Albums (IRMA)	10
Italian Albums (FIMI)	23
Japanese Albums (Oricon)	53
Mexican Albums (Top 100 Mexico)	9
New Zealand Albums (RMNZ)	17
Norwegian Albums (VG-lista)	7
Polish Albums (ZPAV)	49
Portuguese Albums (AFP)	18
Scottish Albums (Official Charts)	12
South African Albums (RISA)	19
Spanish Albums (Promusicae)	51
Swedish Albums (Sverigetopplistan)	19
Swiss Albums (Schweizer Hitparade)	6
UK Albums (Official Charts)	11
US Billboard 200	9
US Top Alternative Albums (Billboard)	3
US Top Rock Albums (Billboard)	3

=== Year-end charts ===
Chart (2008)	Position
Australian Albums (ARIA)	30
Austrian Albums (Ö3 Austria)	63
European Albums (Billboard)	82
French Albums (SNEP)	111
German Albums (Offizielle Top 100)	86
Swiss Albums (Schweizer Hitparade)	77
UK Albums (Official Charts)	47
US Billboard 200	73
US Top Rock Albums (Billboard)	18
Worldwide Albums (IFPI)	33

Chart (2009)	Position
Australian Albums (ARIA)	49
Austrian Albums (Ö3 Austria)	26
Belgian Albums (Ultratop Flanders)	77
Belgian Albums (Ultratop Wallonia)	62
Danish Albums (Hitlisten)	59
European Albums (Billboard)	29
French Albums (SNEP)	64
German Albums (Offizielle Top 100)	46
Mexican Albums (AMPROFON)	66
Swiss Albums (Schweizer Hitparade)	32
UK Albums (Official Charts)	84
US Billboard 200	51
US Top Rock Albums (Billboard)	14

Chart (2010)	Position
Australian Albums (ARIA)	94
UK Albums (Official Charts)	98

== Certifications and sales ==
Certifications and sales for One of the Boys
Region	Certification	Certified units/sales
Australia (ARIA)	3× Platinum	210,000^{‡}
Austria (IFPI Austria)	Platinum	20,000^{*}
Belgium (BRMA)	Gold	15,000^{*}
Canada (Music Canada)	5× Platinum	400,000^{‡}
Chile	3× Platinum	
Denmark (IFPI Danmark)	2× Platinum	40,000^{‡}
Finland	2× Platinum	40,000
France (SNEP)	2× Platinum	200,000^{*}
Germany (BVMI)	3× Gold	300,000^{^}
Greece (IFPI Greece)	Gold	3,000
Ireland (IRMA)	Platinum	15,000^{^}
Italy (FIMI) (Since 2009)	Platinum	50,000^{‡}
New Zealand (RMNZ)	2× Platinum	30,000^{^}
Norway (IFPI Norway)	2× Platinum	40,000^{‡}
Portugal (AFP)	Gold	10,000^{^}
Sweden (GLF)	Gold	20,000^{^}
Switzerland (IFPI Switzerland)	Platinum	30,000^{‡}
United Kingdom (BPI)	2× Platinum	758,410
United States (RIAA)	3× Platinum	3,000,000^{‡}
Summaries
Europe (IFPI)	Platinum	1,000,000^{*}
Worldwide	—	7,000,000
^{*} Sales figures based on certification alone.^{^} Shipments figures based on certification alone.^{‡} Sales+streaming figures based on certification alone.
