= Thinking of You (Katy Perry song) =

2009 single by Katy Perry

Single by Katy Perry

from the album One of the Boys
- Written: 2002
- Released: January 12, 2009
- Studio: Deathstar, Butch's Old House (Los Feliz)
- Genre: Soft rock
- Length: 4:06
- Label: Capitol
- Songwriter: Katy Perry
- Producer: Butch Walker

Katy Perry singles chronology
"Hot n Cold" (2008)	"Thinking of You" (2009)	"Waking Up in Vegas" (2009)

Music video
- "Thinking of You" on YouTube

"Thinking of You" is a song written and recorded by American singer and songwriter Katy Perry from her second studio album, One of the Boys (2008). It was written by Perry herself in 2002, a year after the release of her debut studio album, Katy Hudson (2001). The song was later recorded in 2008 and produced by Butch Walker, who held the sessions at his old "Deathstar" house, based in Los Feliz, Los Angeles. "Thinking of You" is a soft rock song that deals with a break-up in which Perry does not want to move on but has no choice, and feels nostalgic of a previous lover while in a relationship with another man.

The song was later released on January 12, 2009, as the album's third single, through Capitol Records. Commercially, it charted within the top 20 in Austria, France, Germany, Italy, the Netherlands, and Scotland as well as the top 30 in Canada, Sweden, the United Kingdom, and the United States. After being included on the Brazilian soap opera India, a Love Story, "Thinking of You" became more popular there and was certified platinum. The track also received platinum certifications within Australia, Canada, and the United States.

Two music videos were released for the song. The first was released in 2007, one year before its inclusion on One of the Boys, and features Perry in two different rooms—black and white—and was directed by a friend of hers. In the second, for the commercial release in 2009, is set in the 1940s she plays a woman who lost her lover, a soldier (played by American actor Matt Dallas), in battle during World War II. Perry began playing the song during gigs as early as 2006, and has performed it at her concert tours the Hello Katy Tour, the California Dreams Tour, the Prismatic World Tour, Witness: The Tour, and The Lifetimes Tour. The song was also performed at her MTV Unplugged set (2009), and appears in the Prismatic World Tour concert film The Prismatic World Tour Live (2015).

== Background and composition ==
"Thinking of You" was written by Perry in 2002 and produced by Butch Walker. Amateur video of Perry performing an entirely acoustic version at the Hotel Café in Los Angeles as early as 2006 is available on YouTube. The song has been described as a soft rock ballad that was compared to Alanis Morissette and Evanescence. An audio video of the song was officially uploaded to Perry's YouTube channel on June 12, 2008. After music video premiere in December 2008, "Thinking of You" was chosen as the third single promoting the album, seeing its first official release on January 12, 2009, when it debuted on the US mainstream radio stations. The next month, the single was issued to American hot adult contemporary format, on February 10. In following weeks, "Thinking of You" received both digital and physical releases, with a CD being released first in Germany by Capitol Records, and later to whole Europe by EMI Music Publishing. On March 9, original and acoustic versions of the song were released on iTunes collectively, and separately on Amazon. Later that month, another CDs were released in the United Kingdom and France.

According to digital sheet music published at Musicnotes.com by Sony-ATV Music Publishing, the song is written in the key of E major and the tempo moves at 76 beats per minute. Perry's vocal range in the song spans from the low note of G♯_{3} to the higher note of C_{5}. According to Perry, the lyrics of the song are about a break-up after which she does not want to move on but has no choice, and is thinking about her ex-boyfriend while she is with her current lover. Perry describes her former lover as "perfection" and feels disgusted with herself when she kisses her current boyfriend, calling him second best in comparison.

== Critical reception ==
The song has received some retrospective praise, with Christopher Rosa of Glamour described it as her most emotional song compared to others in her discography, adding that it is "one of Perry's rawest vocal performances, but [the] chorus still packs a punch."

Writing for BBC Music, Lizzie Ennever exalted her vocal performance while commenting that the song possesses "edge" and "rawness" that, according to Ennever, are characteristic of the "real [Perry]". David Balls from Digital Spy described the track as a "serious offering designed to show off her vocal and songwriting talents", and compared it to the catalogues of Alanis Morissette and band Evanescence. Giving it three stars out of five, he wrote: "So does she succeed? Well, certainly not for want of trying." In a less positive review, Nicole Frehsee from Rolling Stone dismissed the song as "generic Dawson's Creek schlock".

Jon Caramanica of The New York Times favored the song's production, stating that Perry works better with melody and emotion. He contrasted the song—which he described as "gently and compellingly angry"—with Perry's singles of sexual themes, and concluded that "feeling deeply is shocking enough". For Contactmusic.com, Kelda Manley called the song "high quality" whereas NME reviewer Alex Miller jokingly regarded it as having "all the emotional subtlety of a flamethrower". A writer for The Boston Globe found similarities to Alanis Morissette's musicality in the track, such as her "sour melodicism" and vocals. Reviewing the single for Billboard, editor CT praised Perry for her "distinct vocal inflection". Another writer of Capital described it as "cracking" and "single material".

== Commercial performance ==
In the United States, "Thinking of You" attained moderate success. The song debuted on the US Billboard component chart Bubbling Under Hot 100 at number five. Three weeks later, it entered the primary Hot 100 chart at number 79; having climbed to number 50 in the following week. It rose fifteen spots one week after, giving the track the title of "Greatest Digital Gainer" for that chart issue. The following week, it reached a peak of number 29, where it stayed for more two weeks. By the seventh week spent on the chart, the song moved to number 31; from there on, it started plummeting down the chart. Following a chart progression of 34– 44– 51– 55– 67– 68– 84, it left the chart at number 97 on the May 9 chart issue. "Thinking of You" has sold 1.1 million copies in the United States as of January 2015.

Internationally, commercial outcomes for "Thinking of You" were likewise modest. In Europe, the song received moderate success. The song debuted at number 63 on the UK Singles Chart. After seven weeks on the chart, the song peaked at number 27. The song peaked at 38 on the Irish Singles Chart. In France, the song was much more successful, debuting at number 11 on the singles chart, and stayed in the charts for 32 weeks, becoming her third top twenty and her second longest-running song after "I Kissed A Girl". The song peaked at number 29 on the Swedish Singles Chart and number 14 on the Italian Singles Chart. In Brazil the song peaked at number one and stayed there for several weeks, partly due to the use of the song in the Emmy-winning soap opera India – A Love Story. In Australia, the song debuted at number 34 on the Australian Singles Chart, which was its peak position. The single stayed in the charts for six weeks.

== Music videos ==
=== Original version ===
The first music video was released in 2007 and surfaced on YouTube in May 2008. The video features Perry in two rooms: a white room in which Perry is happily in a relationship and a dark room with an unhappy Perry showing signs of regret. In the dark room, Perry smokes a cigarette as a man dressed in a suit sits beside her. Soon after, another woman enters and pushes Perry off to the side. Back in the white room, Perry sips red wine as her lover undresses beside her, while Perry's hands are wet with blood and there is blood on the bedsheets. The video ends with the revelation that Perry stabbed her lover in the white room in the back, as she sings tearfully while covered in blood before the shot spans to the side, showing the knife on the floor. The video uses a cross-cutting technique that compares the two relationships. Perry stated that the aim of the video was never to get a commercial release, but that it is just a simple video "made by a friend".

=== Commercial version ===
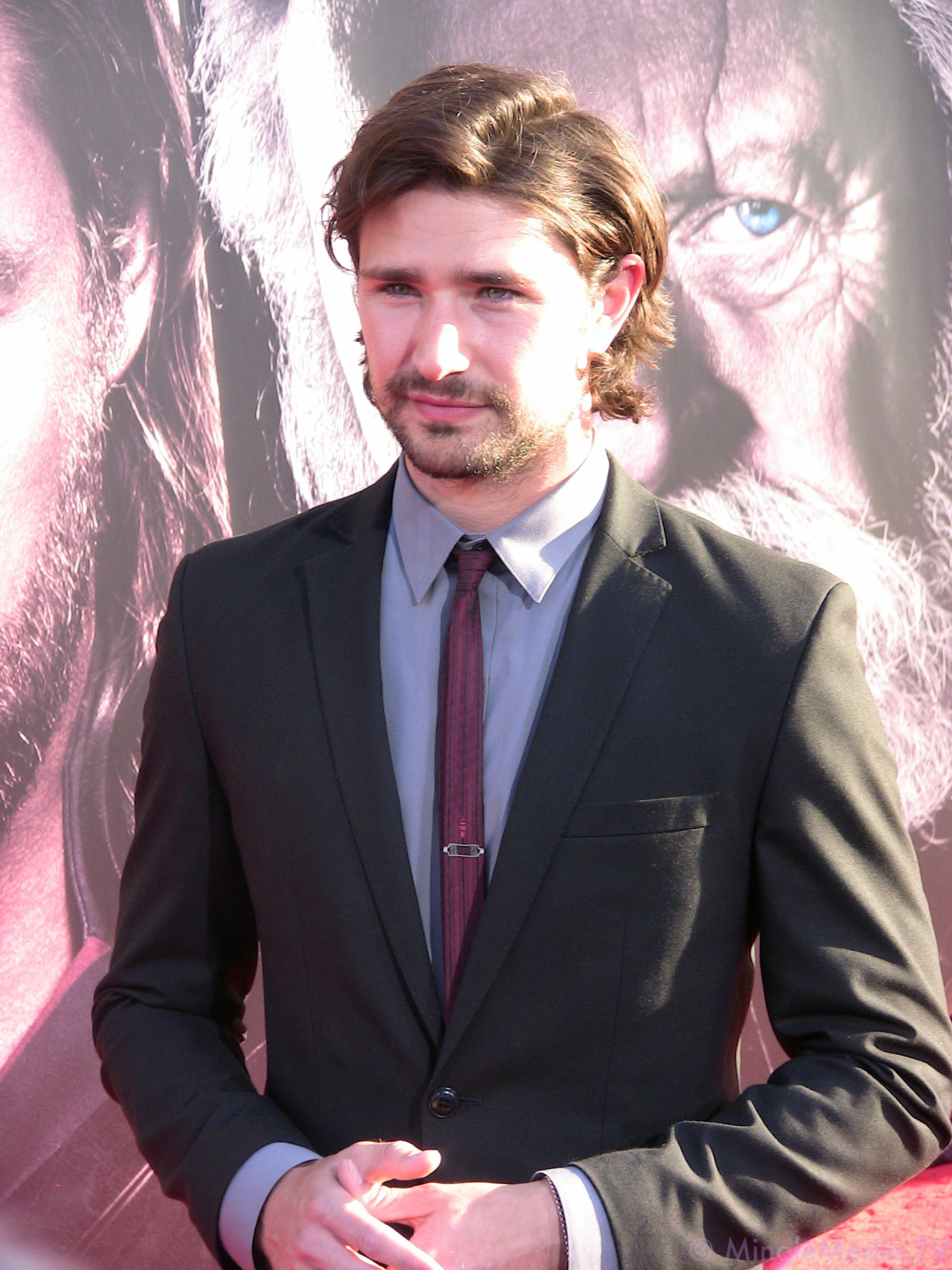
Matt Dallas portrays Perry's soldier love interest in the commercial music video.

Perry revealed on her blog that she had already started filming a second and official music video in the first week of December 2008, directed by Melina Matsoukas. The video premiered exclusively on iTunes on December 23, 2008. The music video is presented as a flashback montage with a young woman whose lover, played by actor Matt Dallas, is killed in France during World War II, and begins with Perry in bed with another man, played by model Anderson Davis. Perry is clearly unhappy with her new partner and longs for her deceased lover as she looks at a photograph of him. Perry reminisces back to a bicycle ride with him, and looks out of her window to see a vision of the two of them laughing outside. Perry's current boyfriend approaches her and kisses her while she remembers a picnic with her former lover, as well as a trip to a lake. In another flashback, Perry slow dances with her former lover at a bar before emotionally waving goodbye to him before he goes to war. While Perry's new love kisses her, she imagines her old lover at a battlefield, being shot and clutching his chest. In another scene, Perry is tearfully applying makeup and putting on a funeral veil, and in another she is opening a letter informing her that her boyfriend has died in battle. After applying dark makeup and dressed in funeral attire, Perry walks out of her house to attend her dead lover's funeral. On April 16, 2012, Perry uploaded on her Vevo channel an "Extended Version" of the video. The video received largely positive reviews from critics.

== Track listing ==
- CD single and 2-track digital download
1. "Thinking of You" – 4:09
2. "Thinking of You" (Acoustic version) – 4:51
- Digital download / French CD single
1. "Thinking of You" – 4:09
  - Digital download
  - streaming
  – Thinking of the One That Got Away EP
1. "The One That Got Away" – 3:47
2. "The One That Got Away" (Acoustic version) – 4:19
3. "Thinking of You" – 4:06
4. "Thinking of You" (Acoustic version) – 4:51
5. "Thinking of You" (Live at MTV Unplugged, 2009) – 4:38
6. "Legendary Lovers" – 3:44

== Credits and personnel ==
Credits are adapted from One of the Boys album liner notes and "Thinking of You" CD release.

=== Publishing and locations ===
- Published by When I'm Rich You'll Be My Bitch / WB Music Corp
- Recorded at Deathstar Studios and Butch's old house (Los Feliz)
- Mixed at Aus Studios (Studio City, Los Angeles)
- Mastered at Bernie Grundman Mastering (Hollywood)

=== Personnel ===
- Katy Perry – vocals, songwriting
- Butch Walker – instrumentation, production
- Darren Dodd – drums
- Dan Chase – keyboards, programming
- Paul Hager – vocal recording
- Joe Zook – mixing
- Brian "Big Bass" Gardener – mastering

== Charts ==
=== Weekly charts ===
Weekly chart performance
Chart (2009–2012)	Peak position
Australia (ARIA)	34
Austria (Ö3 Austria Top 40)	18
Belgium (Ultratip Bubbling Under Flanders)	9
Belgium (Ultratip Bubbling Under Wallonia)	14
Canada Hot 100 (Billboard)	24
Canada CHR/Top 40 (Billboard)	19
Canada Hot AC (Billboard)	10
CIS Airplay (TopHit)	137
Croatia International Airplay (HRT)	11
Czech Republic Airplay (ČNS IFPI)	12
Europe (European Hot 100 Singles)	20
France (SNEP)	11
Germany (GfK)	19
Ireland (IRMA)	38
Italy (FIMI)	14
Netherlands (Dutch Top 40)	18
Netherlands (Single Top 100)	79
Scottish Singles Sales (Official Charts)	11
Slovakia Airplay (ČNS IFPI)	37
Sweden (Sverigetopplistan)	29
Switzerland (Schweizer Hitparade)	45
UK Singles (Official Charts)	27
US Billboard Hot 100	29
US Adult Contemporary (Billboard)	26
US Adult Pop Airplay (Billboard)	11
US Pop Airplay (Billboard)	17

Chart (2026)	Peak position
Philippines Hot 100 (Billboard Philippines)	20

=== Monthly charts ===
Monthly chart performance for "Thinking of You"
Chart (2009)	Position
Brazil (Brasil Hot 100 Airplay)	10
Brazil (Brasil Hot Pop Songs)	5

=== Year-end charts ===
Year-end chart performance for "Thinking of You"
Chart (2009)	Position
Brazil (Crowley)	51
Croatia International Airplay (HRT)	75
Europe (European Hot 100 Singles)	88
US Adult Top 40 (Billboard)	48

== Certifications and sales ==
Certifications for "Thinking of You"
Region	Certification	Certified units/sales
Australia (ARIA)	Platinum	70,000^{‡}
Brazil (Pro-Música Brasil) DMS	Platinum	60,000^{*}
Brazil (Pro-Música Brasil)	Platinum	60,000^{‡}
Canada (Music Canada)	Platinum	40,000^{*}
France	—	32,954 (Note: France sales figures as of December 2009.)
New Zealand (RMNZ)	Gold	15,000^{‡}
United Kingdom (BPI)	Silver	200,000^{‡}
United States (RIAA)	Platinum	1,100,000 (Note: United States sales figures as of February 2017.)
^{*} Sales figures based on certification alone.^{‡} Sales+streaming figures based on certification alone.

== Release history ==
Release dates and formats for "Thinking of You"
Region	Date	Format	Version(s)	Label	Ref.
United States	January 12, 2009	Contemporary hit radio	Original	Capitol	
United States	February 10, 2009	Hot adult contemporary radio	Original	Capitol	
Germany	February 20, 2009	CD	Original; acoustic	Capitol	
Europe	March 3, 2009	CD	Original; acoustic	EMI	
Various	March 9, 2009	Digital download	Original; acoustic	Capitol	
United Kingdom	March 9, 2009	CD	Original; acoustic	Virgin	
United States	March 23, 2009	Adult contemporary radio	Original	Capitol	
France	March 30, 2009	CD	Original	Capitol	
