= Hello Katy Tour =

2009 concert tour by Katy Perry

- World tour by Katy Perry
- Promotional poster for the tour
- Location: Asia; Australia; Europe; North America
- Associated album: One of the Boys
- Start date: January 23, 2009
- End date: August 30, 2009
- Legs: 11
- No. of shows: 86
- Box office: $1.5 million ($2.25 million in 2025 dollars)

Katy Perry concert chronology
- Strangely Normal Tour (2001); Hello Katy Tour (2009); California Dreams Tour (2011–2012)

The Hello Katy Tour was the debut solo concert tour by American singer Katy Perry, supporting her second studio album, One of the Boys (2008). It ran from January 23 to August 30, 2009, and visited North America, Europe, Asia and Australia.

== Background ==
Perry first announced the tour in November 2008, following the 2008 MTV Europe Music Awards, which she hosted. The tour's title was inspired by, and is a play on, the Japanese Sanrio character Hello Kitty. In an interview with Billboard, Perry stated, "I have the guy who creates stages for Madonna working on this tour; I'm indulging my obsession with fruit and cats and designing all different outfits."

== Concert synopsis ==
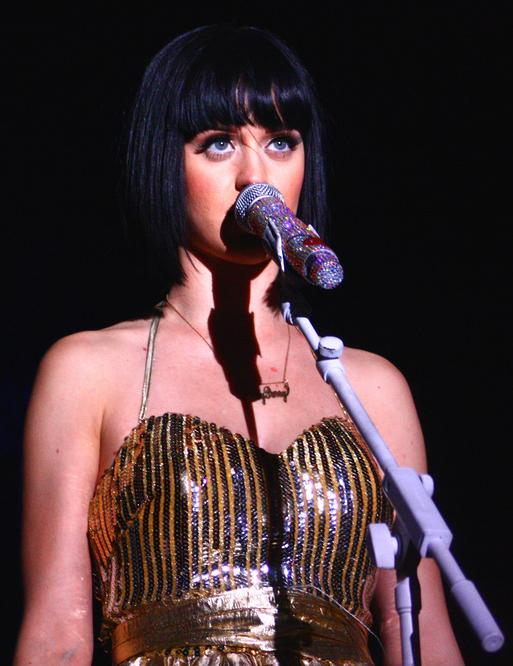
Perry performing in Detroit, Michigan on March 27, 2009

The stage design featured a white picket fence, mailbox, oversized pink flamingos, inflatable plastic fruit, and a giant cat named Kitty Purry that glowed during the encore. Perry had two costumes during the show. During the encore, she appeared dressed as a cat.

Each show opened with "California Girls" by The Beach Boys being played as Perry appeared on the stage. "Fingerprints", "One of the Boys", "Hot n Cold", "Self Inflicted" and a cover of The Outfield's "Your Love" followed. After this section, she picked up her guitar and performed an acoustic version of "Mannequin" and "Thinking of You". The next songs were "Ur So Gay" and "Waking Up in Vegas", upon which confetti rained down onto the audience. Perry continued her act with "Lost", "I'm Still Breathing", "I Think I'm Ready" and "If You Can Afford Me". At this point of the concert, she exited the stage for a costume change and re-appeared, dressed as a cat. A stage-prop of a massive cat's head glows as Perry covered Queen's song "Don't Stop Me Now". She concluded the shows with "I Kissed a Girl", and exited the stage after thanking the audience.

== Critical reception ==
The Orange County Register called the tour "a surprisingly strong performance" in a positive review. In a negative review, Variety called the tour "chilly" and "calculated". Seventeen, impressed with the tour, posted a list of ten things they liked about it.

== Set list ==
1. "Fingerprints"
2. "One of the Boys"
3. "Hokey Pokey"
4. "Hot N Cold"
5. "Self Inflicted"
6. "Mannequin"
7. "Thinking of You"
8. "Ur So Gay"
9. "Waking Up in Vegas"
10. "Lost"
11. "I'm Still Breathing"
12. "I Think I'm Ready"
13. "If You Can Afford Me"

Encore

14. "I Kissed a Girl"

Notes

1. "Hackensack", a Fountains of Wayne cover, was performed after "Lost" on August 21 and August 29.
2. "Don't Stop Me Now" was played before the encore on July 28. "Starstrukk" was played as an encore instead with a special appearance by 3OH!3.

== Tour dates ==
List of concerts
Date	City	Country	Venue
January 23, 2009	Seattle	United States	Showbox at the Market
January 25, 2009	Vancouver	Canada	Commodore Ballroom
January 27, 2009	Portland	United States	Crystal Ballroom
January 28, 2009	San Francisco	United States	The Fillmore
January 29, 2009	Sacramento	United States	Empire Events Center
January 31, 2009	Los Angeles	United States	Wiltern Theatre
February 2, 2009	Tucson	United States	Centennial Hall
February 3, 2009	Tempe	United States	Marquee Theatre
February 5, 2009	San Diego	United States	House of Blues
February 10, 2009	Salt Lake City	United States	In the Venue
February 22, 2009	Stockholm	Sweden	Nalen
February 23, 2009	Copenhagen	Denmark	K.B. Hallen
February 25, 2009	Manchester	England	Manchester Academy
February 26, 2009	London	England	KOKO
February 27, 2009	London	England	KOKO
March 1, 2009	Amsterdam	Netherlands	Melkweg
March 2, 2009	Paris	France	Élysée Montmartre
March 4, 2009	Munich	Germany	TonHalle
March 5, 2009	Neu-Isenburg	Germany	Hugenottenhalle
March 6, 2009	Hamburg	Germany	Große Freiheit
March 7, 2009	Brussels	Belgium	Ancienne Belgique
March 23, 2009	Kansas City	United States	Beaumont Club
March 24, 2009	Minneapolis	United States	First Avenue
March 26, 2009	Chicago	United States	House of Blues
March 27, 2009	Detroit	United States	Clutch Cargo's
March 28, 2009	Cleveland	United States	House of Blues
March 30, 2009	Toronto	Canada	The Guvernment
March 31, 2009	Montreal	Canada	Metropolis
April 1, 2009	Boston	United States	House of Blues
April 3, 2009 (Note: Part of Dinah Shore Weekend.)	Palm Springs	United States	Convention Center
April 5, 2009	Philadelphia	United States	The Fillmore
April 6, 2009	New York City	United States	The Fillmore
April 7, 2009	New York City	United States	The Fillmore
April 8, 2009	New York City	United States	The Fillmore
April 10, 2009	Washington, D.C.	United States	9:30 Club
April 11, 2009	Myrtle Beach	United States	House of Blues
April 14, 2009	Nashville	United States	Cannery Ballroom
April 15, 2009	Atlanta	United States	Center Stage
April 28, 2009	St. Petersburg	United States	Jannus Landing
April 29, 2009	Fort Lauderdale	United States	Revolution Live
May 1, 2009 (Note: Part of Beale Street Festival.)	Memphis	United States	Tom Lee Park
May 2, 2009 (Note: Part of Schaeffer Eye Center Crawfish Boil.)	Birmingham	United States	Jefferson Convention Conplex
May 11, 2009	Dallas	United States	House of Blues
May 25, 2009	Osaka	Japan	Club Quattro
May 26, 2009	Nagoya	Japan	Club Quattro
May 28, 2009	Tokyo	Japan	Duo Music Exchange
May 29, 2009	Tokyo	Japan	Duo Music Exchange
June 1, 2009 (Note: Part of Pinkpop Festival.)	Landgraaf	Netherlands	Landgraaf Megaland Park
June 9, 2009	London	England	O_{2} Shepherds Bush Empire
June 10, 2009	London	England	O_{2} Shepherds Bush Empire
June 11, 2009	Brighton	England	Brighton Dome
June 13, 2009 (Note: Part of Caribana Festival.)	Crans-près-Céligny	Switzerland	Port de Crans
June 14, 2009	Zürich	Switzerland	Volkshaus
June 16, 2009	Paris	France	L'Olympia
June 17, 2009	Lyon	France	Le Transbordeur
June 19, 2009 (Note: Part of Hurricane Festival)	Scheeßel	Germany	MSC Eichenring
June 20, 2009	Cologne	Germany	Palladium Köln
June 21, 2009 (Note: Part of Southside Festival)	Tuttlingen	Germany	Flugplatz Tuttlingen
June 25, 2009 (Note: Part of U18 Festival)	Barcelona	Spain	Palau Sant Jordi
June 26, 2009 (Note: Part of U18 Festival)	Madrid	Spain	Palacio de Deportes
June 27, 2009 (Note: Part of Costa Pop 2009)	Málaga	Spain	Auditorio Municipal
June 28, 2009	Lisbon	Portugal	Campo Pequeno
July 2, 2009 (Note: Part of Nibe Festival)	Nibe	Denmark	Skalskoven
July 4, 2009 (Note: Part of Rock Werchter)	Werchter	Belgium	Werchter Festivalpark
July 5, 2009 (Note: Part of Main Square Festival)	Arras	France	La Citadelle
July 6, 2009	Esch-sur-Alzette	Luxembourg	Rockhal
July 8, 2009 (Note: Part of X-Jam Festival)	Belek	Turkey	Magic Life Club
July 9, 2009	Istanbul	Turkey	True Blue Fenerbahçe
July 11, 2009 (Note: Part of T in the Park)	Perth and Kinross	Scotland	Balado
July 12, 2009 (Note: Part of Oxegen 2009)	Kildare	Ireland	Punchestown Racecourse
July 25, 2009	Boston	United States	Agganis Arena
July 26, 2009	Toronto	Canada	Molson Amphitheatre
July 28, 2009	New York City	United States	Hammerstein Ballroom
July 30, 2009	Atlantic City	United States	Borgata Event Center
August 2, 2009	Houston	United States	Verizon Wireless Theater
August 12, 2009	Brisbane	Australia	The Tivoli
August 14, 2009	Melbourne	Australia	The Forum
August 17, 2009	Sydney	Australia	Enmore Theatre
August 18, 2009	Sydney	Australia	Enmore Theatre
August 21, 2009	Glasgow	Scotland	Barrowland Ballroom
August 22, 2009 (Note: Part of V Festival)	Staffordshire	England	Weston Park
August 23, 2009	Chelmsford	England	Hylands Park
August 25, 2009	Birmingham	England	O_{2} Academy Birmingham
August 26, 2009	Newcastle	England	O_{2} Academy Newcastle
August 29, 2009	Los Angeles	United States	Hollywood Palladium
August 30, 2009	Santa Barbara	United States	Santa Barbara Bowl

== Box office score data ==
Venue	City	Tickets sold / available	Gross revenue
Showbox at the Market	Seattle	1,150 / 1,150 (100%)	$19,980
Commodore Ballroom	Vancouver	990 / 990 (100%)	$20,111
The Fillmore	San Francisco	1,314 / 1,314 (100%)	$23,980
Wiltern Theatre	Los Angeles	2,690 / 2,690 (100%)	$44,913
House of Blues	San Diego	1,000 / 1,000 (100%)	$18,000
KOKO	London	2,752 / 2,800 (98%)	$53,623
Ancienne Belgique	Brussels	1,850 / 1,850 (100%)	$49,080
First Avenue	Minneapolis	1,534 / 1,534 (100%)	$36,816
Clutch Cargo's	Detroit	1,121 / 1,275 (88%)	$21,438
House of Blues	Cleveland	1,300 / 1,300 (100%)	$23,400
House of Blues	Boston	2,597 / 2,597 (100%)	$43,650
The Fillmore Irving Plaza	New York City	3,520 / 3,599 (98%)	$58,524
9:30 Club	Washington, D.C.	1,200 / 1,200 (100%)	$21,600
House of Blues	North Myrtle Beach	2,067 / 2,067 (100%)	$32,039
Jannus Landing	St. Petersburg	1,429 / 1,500 (95%)	$22,732
House of Blues	Dallas	1,647 / 1,647 (100%)	$29,658
Shepherd's Bush Empire	London	3,960 / 3,960 (100%)	$94,726
Brighton Dome	Brighton	1,819 / 1,819 (100%)	$40,143
Agganis Arena	Boston	2,879 / 3,800 (76%)	$84,930
Molson Amphitheatre	Toronto	6,531 / 8,000 (82%)	$163,072
Hammerstein Ballroom	New York City	3,849 / 3,853 (99%)	$110,212
The Borgata	Atlantic City	2,495 / 3,000 (83%)	$87,453
Verizon Wireless Theater	Houston	3,262 / 3,262 (100%)	$41,360
The Tivoli	Brisbane	1,357 / 1,500 (90%)	$62,416
The Forum	Melbourne	1,318 / 1,500 (88%)	$65,587
Enmore Theatre	Sydney	3,299 / 4,735 (70%)	$162,558
O2 Academy Birmingham	Birmingham	3,000 / 3,000 (100%)	$66,746
Hollywood Palladium	Los Angeles	3,044 / 4,940 (62%)	$45,939
Santa Barbara Bowl	Santa Barbara	4,603 / 4,603 (100%)	$115,075
TOTAL		69,577 / 76,485 (90.96%)	$1,508,092
