= So Called Life =

Single by Three Days Grace

from the album Explosions
- Released: November 26, 2021
- Recorded: 2021
- Genre: Grunge, hard rock
- Length: 3:26
- Label: RCA
- Songwriters: Matt Walst; Brad Walst; Barry Stock; Neil Sanderson; Ted Bruner
- Producer: Howard Benson

Three Days Grace singles chronology
"Somebody That I Used to Know" (2020)	"So Called Life" (2021)	"Lifetime" (2022)

Music video
- "So Called Life" on YouTube

"So Called Life" is a single by the Canadian rock band Three Days Grace. It was released on November 29, 2021, as the lead single from the band's seventh studio album Explosions. The song was available digitally on music streaming services on December 1, 2021. "So Called Life" was the most played song on rock radio in 2022.

== Composition and lyrics ==
"So Called Life" has been described by critics as a grunge and hard rock song. The track runs at 160 BPM and is in the key of D minor, with a duration of three minutes and twenty-six seconds. The song was written by Matt Walst, Brad Walst, Barry Stock, Neil Sanderson and Ted Bruner while Howard Benson handled the production of the song. The song was written around March 2020 and according to bassist Brad Walst, the song was originally supposed to be a "cool kind of party song". Brad Walst spoke about "So Called Life" in an interview with Jave Patterson of Two Doods Reviews explaining about how the song was written.

"It's a little different. It's a pretty heavy song and definitely full of emotions and frustrations of everyday life. It was actually the first song we wrote on this record, going back almost pre-pandemic. We started jamming, actually, beside Neil's pool and it turned out really angry. I think it's a great tune. I think the fans are gonna relate to it. And it's gonna be a fun one live, I know that".

== Music video ==
The music video for "So Called Life" premiered on November 29, 2021, and it was directed by Jon Vulpine. Speaking about the music video, director Jon Vulpine explained how the video came together.

"I wanted to make this video really raw and stripped down. Something high energy with extreme angles and fast movements. A bunch of old analog gear in this 70's apartment that looked like some hoarder died in it 20 years ago and the guys just came in and recorded. I didn't want to go for a clean and super polished look so Justin Jones, my DP, suggested these rehoused 1960's Japanese lenses for a grittier more contrasty feel. That along with different lens distortions and attachments just added to the diversity of shots".

== Chart performance ==
"So Called Life" debuted on the Canada Rock chart at number 41 and later peaked at number 7 on the chart. The song also reached the Billboard Mainstream Rock chart at number 1, topping the chart for four consecutive weeks, and on the Hot Rock & Alternative Songs chart at number 29. This marks the band's sixteenth number-one song on the Mainstream Rock Airplay chart, tying the record for the most number-ones with Shinedown. It earned 796,000 streams in the US. It also peaked at number 11 on the Alternative Digital Song Sales chart.

== Charts ==
=== Weekly charts ===
Weekly chart performance for "So Called Life"
Chart (2021–2023)	Peak position
Canada Rock (Billboard)	7
Germany Rock Airplay (GfK)	2
Finland (Suomen virallinen lista)	80
US Hot Rock & Alternative Songs (Billboard)	29
US Rock & Alternative Airplay (Billboard)	8

=== Year-end charts ===
Year-end chart performance for "So Called Life"
Chart (2022)	Position
Canada Active Rock (Mediabase)	3
US Hot Rock & Alternative Songs (Billboard)	68
US Rock Airplay (Billboard)	17

== Certifications ==
Certifications for "So Called Life"
Region	Certification	Certified units/sales
United States (RIAA)	Gold	500,000^{‡}
^{‡} Sales+streaming figures based on certification alone.

== Awards and nominations ==
Awards and nominations for "So Called Life"
Year	Organization	Award	Result	Ref(s)
2022	MTV Video Music Awards	Rock Video of the Year	Nominated	
2023	iHeartRadio Music Awards	Rock Song of the Year	Nominated	

== Release history ==
Release history and formats for "So Called Life"
Region	Date	Format	Label	Ref.
Canada	November 29, 2021	Contemporary hit radio	RCA	
Various	December 1, 2021	Digital download	RCA	
United States	December 6, 2021	Active rock	RCA	
Italy	January 21, 2022	Contemporary hit radio	Sony	
