= Waking Up in Vegas =

2009 single by Katy Perry

Single by Katy Perry

from the album One of the Boys
- Released: April 21, 2009
- Studio: Rocket Carousel (Los Angeles)
- Genre: Pop rock; power pop
- Length: 3:19
- Label: Capitol
- Songwriters: Katy Perry; Desmond Child; Andreas Carlsson
- Producers: Greg Wells; Katy Perry

Katy Perry singles chronology
"Thinking of You" (2009)	"Waking Up in Vegas" (2009)	"Starstrukk" (2009)

Music videos
- "Waking Up in Vegas" on YouTube "Waking Up in Vegas" (Manhattan Clique remix) on YouTube

"Waking Up in Vegas" is a song by American singer Katy Perry, released as the fourth and final single from her second studio album, One of the Boys (2008). Perry wrote the song with Desmond Child and Andreas Carlsson, and Greg Wells produced it alongside Perry. Wells is also credited for playing all the instruments on the song. The song was recorded in Rocket Carousel, based in Los Angeles. "Waking Up in Vegas" is a pop rock and power pop track about an underage couple getting drunk and blowing their money in Las Vegas, paying homage to the phrase "what happens in Vegas, stays in Vegas."

The single was officially released to US radio stations on April 21, 2009, through Capitol Records. It attained commercial success, charting at number one in Hungary while reaching the top 10 in Canada, Ireland, New Zealand, Slovakia, and the United States as well as the top 20 in Australia, Iceland, Israel, the Netherlands, and the United Kingdom. "Waking Up in Vegas" also received multi-platinum certifications in Australia, Canada, and the United States.

The music video was directed by Joseph Kahn and it features Perry and American actor Joel David Moore in Las Vegas Valley partying and gambling. She performed the track during her Hello Katy Tour and California Dreams Tour, and an acoustic snippet was sung during the Las Vegas show of Witness: The Tour. The song was also used to promote Perry's concert residency at Resorts World Las Vegas, Play, which began in December 2021. A jazz version of the song was later included in the actual setlist itself.

== Background and release ==
According to A&R Chris Anokute, "Waking Up in Vegas" played a significant role in initiating Perry's pivotal move to Capitol Records. Having been recorded while still under contract with Columbia Records for an album that was then shelved, Anokute later heard the track on a three-song demo and tried to convince his employers at Capitol to sign Perry, claiming it was a number-one single and its singer a star talent. In an interview with HitQuarters, one of the songwriters of the song, Andreas Carlsson, claimed that he worked together with Perry and Desmond Child to write "Waking Up in Vegas". Carlsson remarked that they "really wanted to tell the story that described that moment when everybody's checking out on Vegas after they've had their fun. And Katy is the perfect artist to tell such a story – she has humour, and she knows how to deliver it." Carlsson also said that two of the first aspects of the song to be composed were the main guitar riff – which he already had pre-prepared – and the phrase "put your money where your mouth is," which they were very keen to use and which for a time was almost used as the song's title.

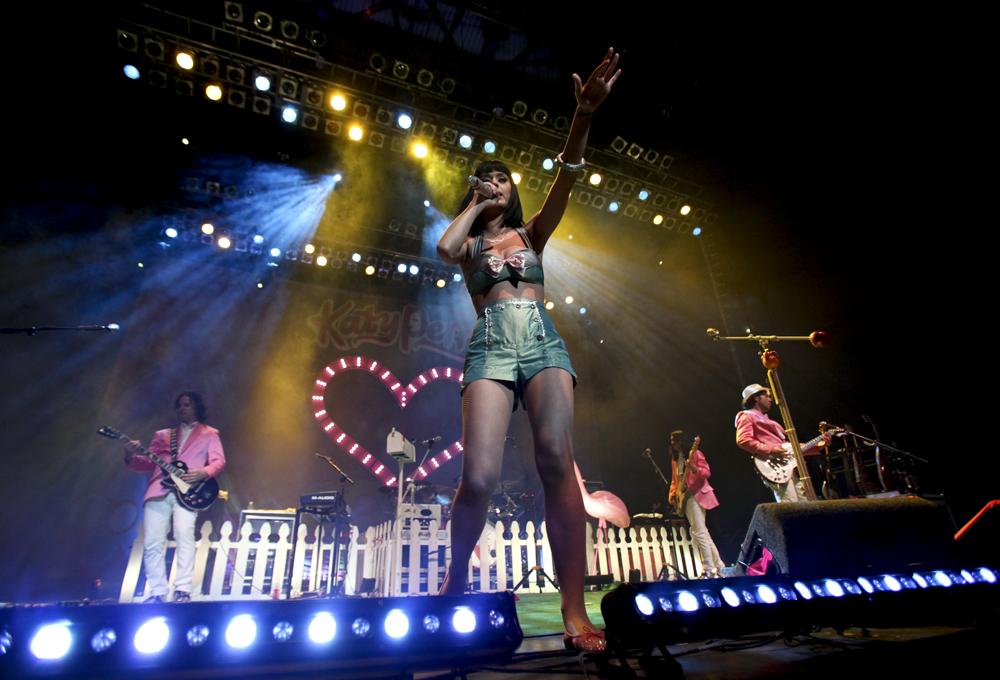
Perry performing during Hello Katy Tour in 2009

In an interview for Pop Eater, Perry revealed the inspiration behind the track:

What inspired it [was] this boy I was dating at the time. I was 21. We went to Vegas on a whim and we decided to get fake married. We took all the pictures with the minister, with the fake cake, in the fake chapel and got a fake marriage certificate. We went and bought a wedding dress and a suit at a thrift store, and scanned the pictures and the certificate to my family members, my manager at the time [and] totally freaked the shit out of them. It was the most hilarious, stupid prank I've ever pulled. I still have the wedding dress and the certificate.

"Waking Up in Vegas" was eventually picked as the album's fourth and final single, being sent to US radio stations on April 21, 2009. On the single's artwork, Perry is seen with two dice behind her, giving more emphasis to the song's lyrical content of being in Vegas. A digital extended play containing the radio edit, Calvin Harris remix, Jason Nevins remixes and Manhattan Clique remixes was released on June 5, 2009. Later in June, the CD single featuring the radio edit version of the song and the Calvin Harris remix edit was released in United Kingdom and Germany.

== Composition and lyrics ==
"Waking Up in Vegas" was produced by Greg Wells, who is also responsible for all instruments in the track, as well as for recording the track at the Rocket Carousel Studio, in Los Angeles, California. According to the sheet music published at Musicnotes.com, by Alfred Music Publishing, the song is written in the key of F major, and moves at a tempo of 126 beats per minute. Perry's vocals span from the low note of A_{3} to the high note of C_{5}. Musically, the song has been described as a pop rock song. Lyrically, according to Plugged In (publication), "Waking Up in Vegas" talks about an underage couple get[ting] drunk and blow[ing] their money before [literally] 'waking up in Vegas'." Perry added that the song is not about apologizing, "[It's] basically a song about getting into trouble with your best friend or your boyfriend or your girlfriend – or whoever you're with – and not having any 'I'm sorry for what I did'."

== Critical reception ==
Billboard writer Michael Menachem gave a positive review, finding it "fun" and calling Perry's voice "infectious". He also said it was "her most radio-friendly song yet." Nick Levine of Digital Spy gave "Waking Up in Vegas" 3 out of 5 stars, calling the song "a giddy pop-rock romp featuring an ace sing-along chorus."

== Commercial performance ==
Following the lower chart position of her previous single "Thinking of You", "Waking Up In Vegas" saw Perry return to the top ten as it peaked at number nine on the Billboard Hot 100, becoming her third top-ten single. "Waking Up in Vegas" also went on to become Perry's second number one hit on Mainstream Top 40, matching the airplay success of "Hot n Cold". In Canada, the song peaked at number two. On the Irish Singles Chart, it peaked at number eight. The song also peaked at number nine in New Zealand and is certified Gold. "Waking Up In Vegas" debuted on the UK Singles Chart at number 107, following her performance on Ant & Dec's Saturday Night Takeaway, and peaked at number 19.

"Waking Up in Vegas" helped One of the Boys return to the top 50 of the Billboard 200 albums chart. It was the 33rd most purchased song on iTunes in the US during 2009. As of January 2015, the song has sold 2.3 million copies in the U.S.

== Music video ==
The music video for "Waking Up in Vegas" showcasing Perry in a Lamborghini Murciélago as she is about to race down the streets of Las Vegas.

The music video was directed by Joseph Kahn, and was shot in Las Vegas, Nevada, on March 26, 2009. It was released on April 28, 2009, on the Australian, UK, and U.S. iTunes Store.

The video begins with Perry holding hands with her love interest, played by Joel David Moore. They are in a laundromat, standing in front of a slot machine. It is the morning after the night before, setting the theme of the song's lyric, "That's what you get for waking up in Vegas". Moore drops one coin into the slot machine and pulls the handle. Three "blazing 7" symbols land on the payline, and the machine delivers a jackpot in quarters. Moore and Perry look at each other in astonishment.

The next scene shows them winning at roulette the night before. They then head to the hotel room, where they kick out Penn and Teller. Subsequent scenes show the couple playing various casino games and parlaying their winnings into millions, defeating poker legend Daniel Negreanu, and being welcomed into the Palms Hotel by owners Gavin and George J. Maloof Jr. As the winning streak continues, Perry and Moore enjoy a lavish lifestyle, racing through the streets of Las Vegas in his-and-hers Lamborghini Murciélagos. At the height of the streak, they are dressed in show costumes while riding in chariots down Fremont Street, accompanied by a fire-breather and an elephant. They end by feasting at a Roman-style banquet, with visuals that recall the Last Supper.

Perry and Moore kiss in a money booth. After the kiss, the couple's luck changes. They begin to argue. They lose all their winnings except a single quarter and are ejected from their hotel suite (which Penn and Teller reclaim, even performing a card trick before slamming the door on the couple). Perry steals food from a room service tray.

The video ends in the laundromat where it began. The couple is broke; Moore places their single remaining coin in the slot machine and pulls the handle. Three "blazing 7" symbols land on the payline, and the machine delivers a jackpot in quarters. Moore and Perry look at each other in astonishment as the screen goes black.

== Live performances ==
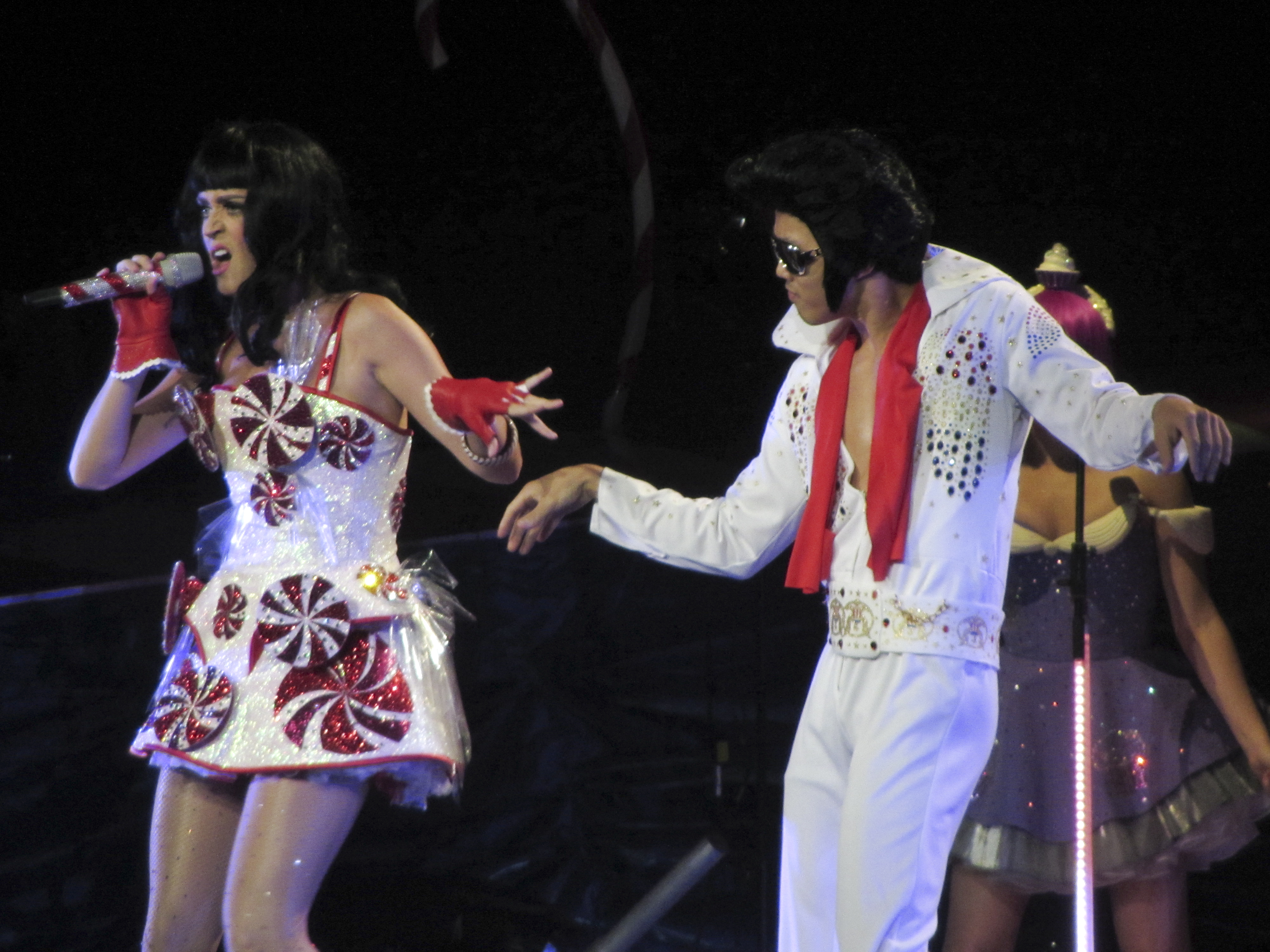
Perry performing "Waking Up in Vegas" during California Dreams Tour

Perry performed "Waking Up in Vegas" on Later... with Jools Holland in September 2008. She was also a guest on Ant & Dec's Saturday Night Takeaway in March 2009 where she performed "Waking Up in Vegas" instead of her then-current single, "Thinking of You", which had been released that month. She performed on a Las Vegas-themed stage with her backing band dressed as Elvis Presley. The single was released to Australian radio on March 23, where it became the fourth most added song in its release week. Perry performed the song on American Idol on May 13, 2009. During the performance, she was dressed in an Elvis-themed outfit and a cape emblazoned with Adam Lambert's name on it.

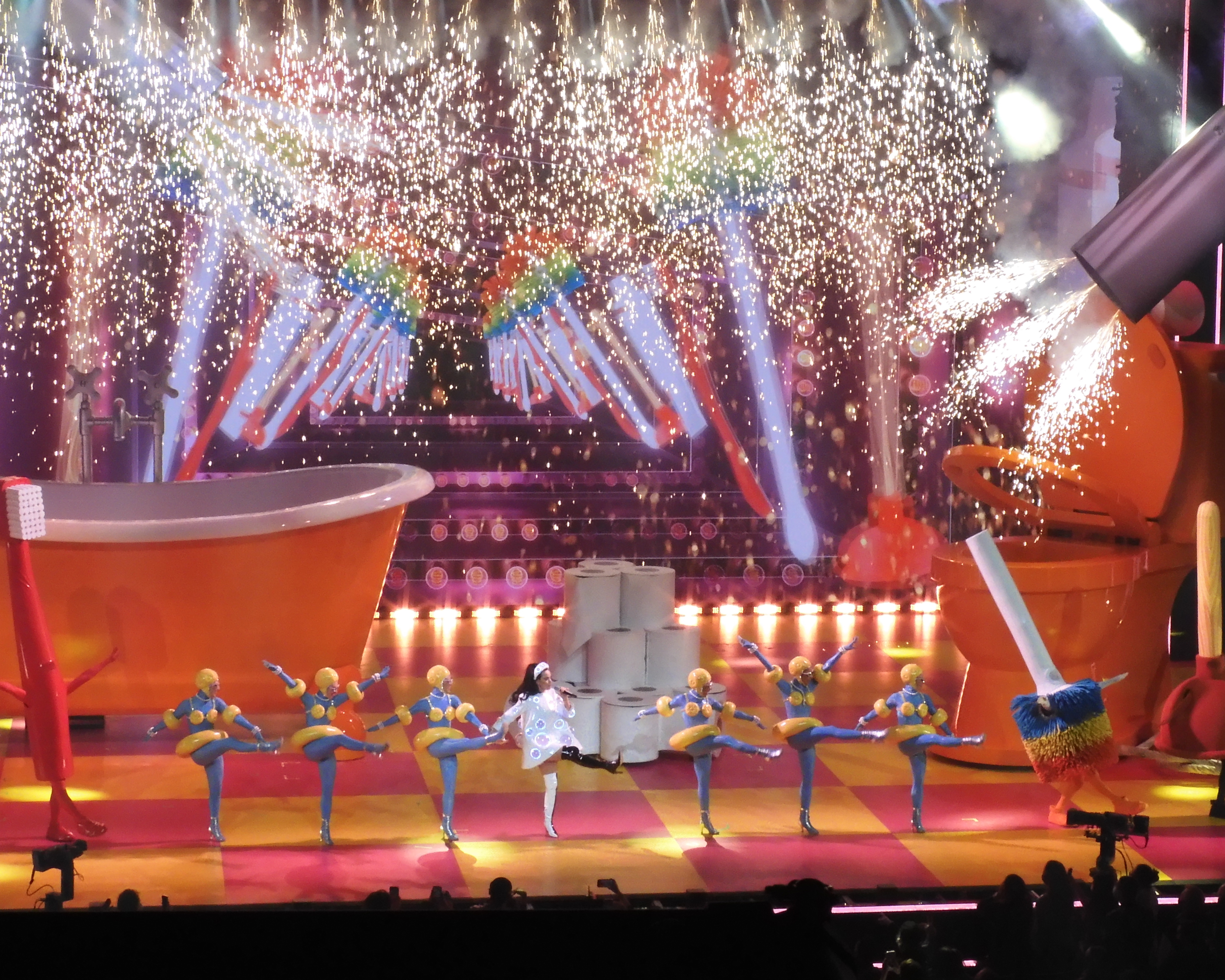
Perry performing "Waking Up in Vegas" during Play

Perry performed the song on July 24, 2009, on NBC's Today show in New York's Rockefeller Plaza. The song was a part of the Perry's set list on Warped Tour and her opening act for No Doubt's Summer Tour 2009. It was the main set closer for the Hello Katy Tour and ending the first segment of California Dreams Tour, which Perry danced with Elvis impersonators and Vegas showgirls, before chasing a slot-machine offstage. During the Vegas stop of Witness: The Tour, Perry sang an acoustic snippet of the song for fans, before performing "Thinking of You". During her Las Vegas residency Play, Perry sang a jazz version.

== Track listing ==
Digital extended play

1. "Waking Up in Vegas" (Radio Edit) – 3:24
2. "Waking Up in Vegas" (Calvin Harris Extended Remix) – 3:44
3. "Waking Up in Vegas" (Jason Nevins Electrotec Club Remix) – 6:41
4. "Waking Up in Vegas" (Jason Nevins Electrotec Dub) – 6:02
5. "Waking Up in Vegas" (Manhattan Clique Bellagio Remix) – 6:18
6. "Waking Up in Vegas" (Manhattan Clique Luxor Dub) – 6:06

German and UK CD Single

1. "Waking Up in Vegas" (Radio Edit) – 3:22
2. "Waking Up in Vegas" (Calvin Harris Radio Edit) – 3:43

== Remixes ==
Calvin Harris Mixes

- "Waking Up in Vegas" (Calvin Harris Extended Mix) – 5:41
- "Waking Up in Vegas" (Calvin Harris Radio Edit) – 3:43

Jason Nevins Mixes

- "Waking Up in Vegas" (Jason Nevins Electrotec Club Mix) – 6:40
- "Waking Up in Vegas" (Jason Nevins Electrotec Dub) – 6:04
- "Waking Up In Vegas" (Jason Nevins Electrotec Edit) – 3:23

Manhattan Clique Mixes

- "Waking Up in Vegas" (Manhattan Clique Bellagio Remix) – 6:22
- "Waking Up in Vegas" (Manhattan Clique Luxor Dub) – 6:08
- "Waking Up In Vegas" (Manhattan Clique Radio Edit) – 3:50

== Credits and personnel ==
Credits adapted from CD single liner notes and Tidal.

=== Publishing and recording locations ===
- Published by When I'm Rich You'll Be My Bitch/Desmando Music/Andreas Carlsson Publishing AR/WB Music Corp
- Recorded at Rocket Carousel Studio, Los Angeles, California
- Mixed at MixStar Studios, Virginia Beach, Virginia
- Mastered at Bornie Grundman Mastering, Hollywood, California

=== Personnel ===
- Katy Perry – vocals, songwriting, production
- Desmond Child – songwriting
- Andreas Carlsson – songwriting
- Greg Wells – production, recording assistant
- Serban Ghenea – mixing
- John Hanes – mixing engineering
- Joe Zook – mixing engineering
- Tim Roberts – mixing engineering assistant
- Brian "Big Bass" Gardner – mastering

== Charts ==
=== Weekly charts ===
Chart (2009)	Peak position
Australia (ARIA)	11
Austria (Ö3 Austria Top 40)	26
Belgium (Ultratip Bubbling Under Flanders)	6
Belgium (Ultratip Bubbling Under Wallonia)	4
Canada Hot 100 (Billboard)	2
Canada AC (Billboard)	36
Canada CHR/Top 40 (Billboard)	3
Canada Hot AC (Billboard)	2
CIS Airplay (TopHit)	149
Croatia International Airplay (HRT)	28
Germany (GfK)	33
Hungary (Rádiós Top 40)	1
Iceland (RÚV)	17
Ireland (IRMA)	8
Israel (Media Forest)	19
Italy (FIMI)	45
Mexico Anglo (Monitor Latino)	7
Netherlands (Dutch Top 40)	12
Netherlands (Single Top 100)	78
New Zealand (Recorded Music NZ)	9
Slovakia Airplay (ČNS IFPI)	10
Sweden (Sverigetopplistan)	32
Switzerland (Schweizer Hitparade)	69
UK Singles (Official Charts)	19
US Billboard Hot 100	9
US Adult Contemporary (Billboard)	26
US Adult Pop Airplay (Billboard)	5
US Dance Club Songs (Billboard)	1
US Dance Singles Sales (Billboard)	8
US Dance Airplay (Billboard)	14
US Pop Airplay (Billboard)	1
US Rhythmic Airplay (Billboard)	33

=== Year-end charts ===
Chart (2009)	Position
Australia (ARIA)	67
Canada (Canadian Hot 100)	28
Croatia International Airplay (HRT)	62
Hungary (Rádiós Top 40)	30
Netherlands (Dutch Top 40)	76
UK Singles (OCC)	138
US Billboard Hot 100	36
US Adult Top 40 (Billboard)	22
US Dance Club Songs (Billboard)	2
US Mainstream Top 40 (Billboard)	12

== Certifications and sales ==
Region	Certification	Certified units/sales
Australia (ARIA)	2× Platinum	140,000^{‡}
Brazil (Pro-Música Brasil)	Platinum	60,000^{*}
Canada (Music Canada)	2× Platinum	160,000^{‡}
France	—	2,300 (Note: Available sales figures in France.)
New Zealand (RMNZ)	Gold	7,500^{*}
United Kingdom (BPI)	Silver	200,000^{‡}
United States (RIAA)	2× Platinum	2,300,000 (Note: United States sales figures as of February 2017.)
^{*} Sales figures based on certification alone.^{‡} Sales+streaming figures based on certification alone.

== Release history ==
Release dates and formats for "Waking Up in Vegas"
Region	Date	Format	Version(s)	Label(s)	Ref.
United States	April 21, 2009	Contemporary hit radio	Original	Capitol	
United States	May 18, 2009	Hot adult contemporary radio	Original	Capitol	
Italy	June 4, 2009	Radio airplay	Original	Polydor	
Various	June 5, 2009	Digital download	Remixes EP	Capitol	
United Kingdom	June 8, 2009	CD	Radio edit; Calvin Harris remix	Virgin; EMI	
Germany	June 19, 2009	CD	Radio edit; Calvin Harris remix	Capitol	
