= Ted Bruner =

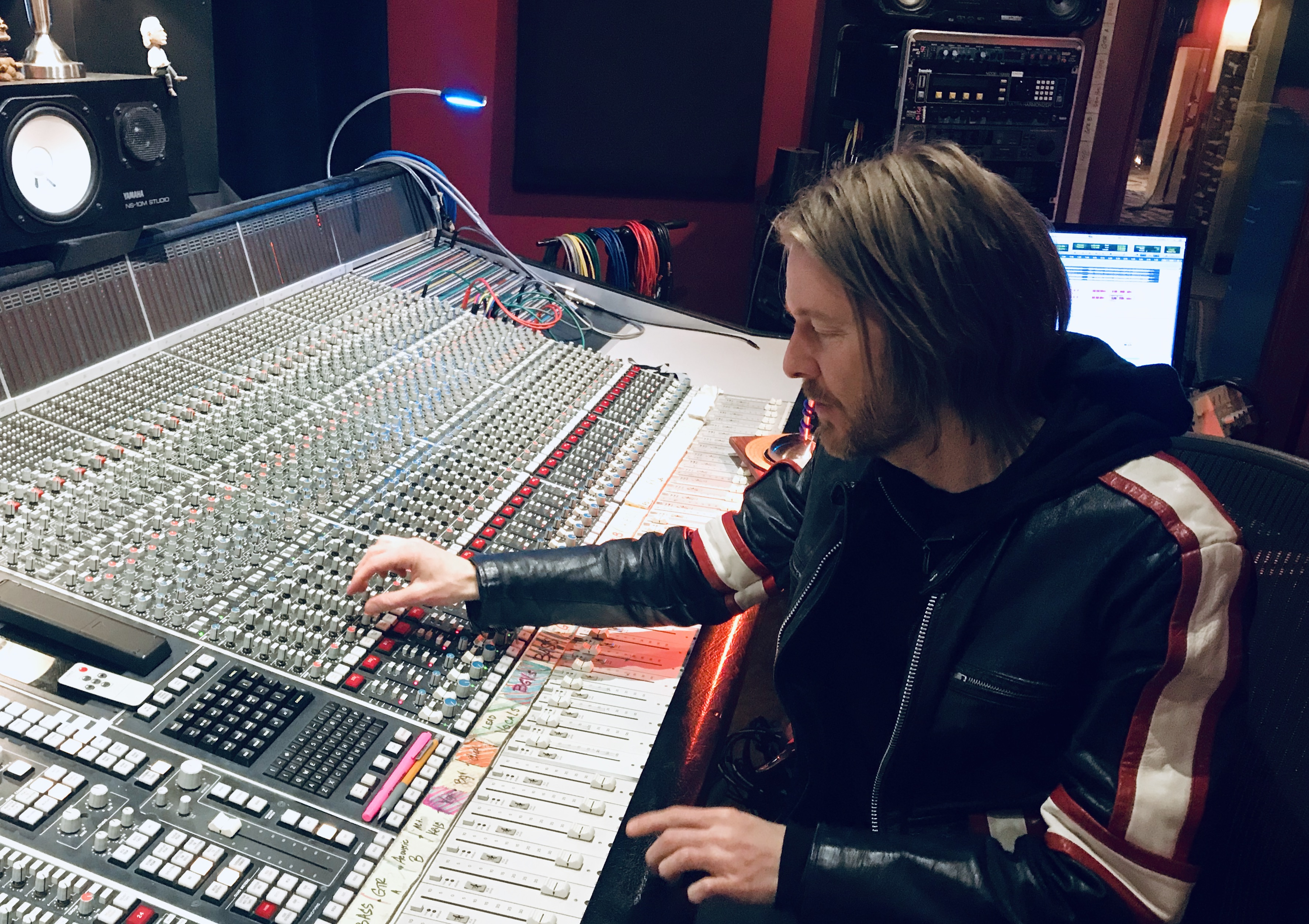
- Ted Bruner recording at Sawhorse Studios in St. Louis, MO in 2020

Background information
- Origin: St. Louis, Missouri, U.S.
- Genres: Pop music, pop rock, rock music
- Occupations: Record producer, songwriter, musician
- Instruments: Guitar, keyboards, voice
- Labels: Kobalt Music Group, Warner Chappell Music, Rondor Music/Universal
- Website: tedbrunermusic.com

Ted Bruner is an American musician, songwriter, and record producer, originally from St. Louis, Missouri, United States.

Bruner began his professional music career when his band Colony was signed to MCA Records. In 2002, he relocated to Los Angeles and began writing and producing for Rondor Music/Universal. He left Universal in 2009 and signed with Warner Chappell Music, and then signed with Kobalt Music Group in 2012. He has written with and/or produced songs for Katy Perry, Miley Cyrus, Kesha, Selena Gomez, Plain White T's, Three Days Grace, My Darkest Days, Cavo, Neil Sanderson, Matt Walst, Barry Stock, Brad Walst, Adam Gontier, Joey Moi, Zakk Cervini, Gavin Brown, Marie Digby, Natalie Walker, Rusko, Bonnie Mckee among others, as well as songs in film and television, and has co-written five #1 US rock singles, including the #1 most played rock radio songs of 2022 and 2025.

In a 2021 interview in Boulder Weekly, Matt Walst, the lead singer of Three Days Grace is quoted as saying "Ted's like. . . well, he's kind of like a therapist," Walst says over a phone interview from his home outside of Toronto. "He'll ask you personal questions because he wants to write about what's real, what's going on in your life. Whenever you can take what you've gone through and make it apply to other people's experience, that's the key to really engaging people in the music—if they can see themselves in it. I feel like Ted is super good at getting into that."

When Bruner got paired with Katy Perry, a wide-eyed pop songwriter who had recently been dropped from a label, he said "She was just so, so sad. She told me that she had one foot out the door, that L.A. was driving her crazy." He encouraged her to channel her pain into her music. One evening in the studio at Universal, Bruner says Perry was ready to explore her pain, and the two co-wrote the song "Lost", which appeared on Perry's platinum selling major label debut, One of the Boys.

In the book It All Begins with the Music, Bruner is quoted as saying "Music is a rebellious path; it's all about freedom, and if you lock down and listen to people who are only worried about making a buck, that will shave off all the reasons you got into it in the first place- to have an adventurous and exciting life. If you keep that mindset, then the music will keep coming to you."

"That's my saying: Spinning on a rock in space, orbiting a ball of fire," Bruner says. "It makes some people feel so small and I'm like, exactly. It just takes all the pressure off of you. Whatever is going on in your life doesn't hold a candle to the infinite magnitude of the universe."

== Selected discography ==
- "Lost" (Katy Perry - One of the Boys album) — Bruner, Perry (Writer/Producer)
- "I Think I'm Ready" (Katy Perry - One of the Boys album) — Bruner, Perry (Writer/Producer)
- "Mayday (Three Days Grace song)" (Three Days Grace) — Bruner, Sanderson, Walst, Gontier, Stock, Walst, Cervini (#1 US Rock Single, #1 Most Played Rock Radio Song of 2025)
- "Don't Wanna Go Home Tonight" (Three Days Grace) — Bruner, Sanderson, Walst, Gontier, Stock, Walst, Cervini, Wilcox (#1 US Rock Single)
- "The Power" (Three Days Grace) — Bruner, Sanderson, Walst, Gontier, Stock, Walst, Cervini, Goldstein
- "So Called Life" (Three Days Grace) — Bruner, Sanderson, Walst, Stock, Walst (#1 US Rock Single, #1 Most Played Rock Radio Song of 2022, 2022 MTV VMA Best Rock Nomination, 2023 iHeartRadio Music Awards Rock Song Of the Year Nomination)
- "Lifetime" (Three Days Grace) — Bruner, Sanderson, Walst, Stock, Walst (#1 US Rock Single)
- "Explosions" (Three Days Grace) — Bruner, Sanderson, Walst, Stock, Walst
- "No Tomorrow" (Three Days Grace) — Bruner, Sanderson, Walst, Stock, Walst
- "Souvenirs" (Three Days Grace) — Bruner, Sanderson, Walst, Stock, Walst
- "Fallen Angel" (Three Days Grace) — Bruner, Sanderson, Walst, Brown, Stock, Walst, Millar, Moi (#6 US Rock Single)
- "The Abyss" (Three Days Grace) — Bruner, Sanderson, Walst, Stock, Walst, Brown
- "Me Against You" (Three Days Grace) — Bruner, Sanderson, Walst, Stock, Walst, Brown
- "Casual Sex" (My Darkest Days) — Bruner, Walst, Moi (First Single)
- "Porn Star Dancing" (My Darkest Days featuring Ludacris & Zakk Wylde) — Bruner, Walst, Moi, Kroeger (#1 US Rock Single)
- "Set It On Fire" (My Darkest Days) — Bruner, Walst, Moi
- "Sick and Twisted Affair" (My Darkest Days) — Bruner, Walst, Moi (Second Single)
- "Down the Road" (Plain White T's) — Bruner, Higgenson
- "Thick As Thieves" (Cavo) — Bruner, Walker, Hobbs (First Single)
- "California" (Cavo) — Bruner, Walker, Hobbs
- "Ohio" (Bowling For Soup) — Bruner, Maloy, Reddick (Third Single)
- "Breakout" (Miley Cyrus) — Bruner, Schock, Vittetoe (Title Track)
- "Crush" (Selena Gomez & the Scene) — Bruner, Schock, Vittetoe (Writer/Producer)
- "Falling Down" (Selena Gomez & the Scene) — Bruner, Schock, Vittetoe (Writer/Producer - First Single)
- "Kiss & Tell" (Selena Gomez & the Scene) — Bruner, Schock, Vittetoe (Writer/Producer - Title Track)
- "Stop and Erase" (Selena Gomez & the Scene) — Bruner, Schock, Vittetoe (Writer/Producer)
- "Magic" (Selena Gomez - Wizards of Waverly Place (soundtrack)) — (Producer)
- "Cool Kids" (Natalie Walker) — Bruner, Walker
- "Girlfriend" (Marie Digby) — Bruner, Digby
- "Spell" (Marie Digby) — Bruner, Digby
- "Bullet" (Jessie James) — Bruner, Perry, Vittetoe, James (Writer/Producer)
- "Girl Next Door" (Jessie James) — Bruner, Perry, Vittetoe (Writer/Producer)
- "Breaking Your Heart" (Jessie James) — Bruner, James
- "Thunder" (Rusko) — Bruner, Mckee
