= Chris Anokute =

American music executive

- Occupations: Music executive; Artist manager; Executive producer
- Years active: c. 2000–present
- Employer: Young Forever Inc. (founder)
- Known for: A&R for Katy Perry, Iggy Azalea, Fifth Harmony and Zara Larsson; management of Muni Long
- Title: Founder, Young Forever Inc.

Chris Anokute is an American music executive and artist manager. He has held senior A&R positions at Virgin/Capitol Records, Universal Motown, Island Def Jam Music Group and Epic Records, and in 2014 founded the artist development and management company Young Forever Inc. At Capitol he was involved in signing Katy Perry and worked as A&R on her first two albums for the label. He later signed Iggy Azalea to Island Def Jam and worked on releases by Fifth Harmony and Zara Larsson at Epic.

== Early life and career ==
Anokute was born to Nigerian parents and grew up in New Jersey; he lives in Los Angeles. At 17, he approached John Houston, father of Whitney Houston, about joining his management team, and Houston became his mentor.

Around the same time, he began an internship in A&R administration at Def Jam under Rob Mitchell. After being promoted to A&R administration assistant, he worked on projects by Sum 41, Ashanti, Foxy Brown and Jay-Z's The Blueprint.

Anokute introduced songwriter Alisha Brooks to producer Vada Nobles, and Brooks co-wrote "Pon de Replay" to one of Nobles's instrumentals. According to Anokute, he then brought the song to Rihanna, who released it as her debut single on Def Jam in 2005.

Anokute was soon hired by Jason Flom as the senior director A&R for Virgin/Capitol Records, where his first A&R work project was Joss Stone's introducing Joss Stone (stylised as Introducing... Joss Stone) (2007). Shortly after, Chris and Jason signed Katy Perry through an introduction from Katy's long time publicist, Angelica Cob-Baehler. He went on to successfully A&R Katy's first two multi-platinum Capitol albums, One Of The Boys (2008) and Teenage Dream (2010), yielding 11 #1 singles and over 50 million albums and singles sold collectively. As an independent hire, Chris also worked A&R on Katy's Smile album (2020), that achieved RIAA gold status, and featured the RIAA platinum, 1 billion plus streaming hit, Never Really Over.

In 2011, Anokute left Capitol to take a job at Universal Motown as their senior vice president, A&R. There, he worked closely with Motown President Sylvia Rhone, assisting her on Kelly Rowland's first album for the label, Here I Am, which included the #1 single Motivation (featuring Lil’ Wayne).

In 2012, Chris made a lateral move to Island Def Jam Music Group, where he served as the company's senior vice-president of A&R. While at Island Def Jam Music Group, Chris signed Australian rapper Iggy Azalea, and worked A&R on her debut album The New Classic. The album featured the 3 multi-platinum singles: Work, Fancy, and Black Widow.

In 2014, Chris launched the entertainment firm, Young Forever Inc. Young Forever is an artist development production company specializing in recording, artist management and executive production. Young Forever's first management/artist development signing was a fairly unknown Bebe Rexha. Young Forever helped develop her initial demos, and later negotiated her major recording and publishing deals with Warner Bros. Records and BMG Music Publishing. They saw some early success together with Bebe's songwriting and vocal collaborations on breakthrough hits such as: "The Monster", by Eminem & Rihanna, "Hey Mama" w/ David Guetta & Nicki Minaj, and "Me, Myself and I" w/ G-Eazy. Young Forever Inc. and Bebe ended their business relationship in early 2016. In that same year, Chris was hired as the SVP of A&R for Epic Records after consulting them for a year. At Epic, Chris handled A&R on Fifth Harmony's breakthrough album 7/27, which delivered their biggest hit to date, "Work from Home" featuring Ty Dolla Sign (5× platinum). He also oversaw A&R on their 3rd studio album, Fifth Harmony. In addition to Fifth Harmony, Chris handled A&R on Swedish pop singer Zara Larsson's debut album, So Good, which was the first debut album from a female to reach one billion streams on Spotify.

In 2019, Chris decided to run the Young Forever business full time moving forward. That same year, he also served as an Executive Producer for American Idol. Young Forever's clients included, LÉON, Muni Long, Curtis Waters and Bebe Rexha to name a few. Muni Long earned a "Best New Artist" nomination and "Best R&B Performance" win at the 2023 Grammy Awards for her song "Hrs and Hrs". Chris has signed and developed 4 artists from the start of their careers that have been nominated for the highly coveted "Best New Artist" award at the Grammys.

Chris has also been featured in Billboard Magazine's A&R power list, and as "Billboard's 30 under 30" and "40 under 40" honors.
