= Katy Hudson (album) =

Studio album by Katy Hudson
- Released: March 6, 2001
- Studios: The Velvet Elvis, Nashville; House of Tom, Cool Springs; Sound Kitchen, Cool Springs; Kong's Cage, Franklin, Tennessee
- Genres: Christian pop; Christian rock; alternative rock
- Length: 48:11
- Label: Red Hill
- Producers: Tommy Collier; Otto Price; David Browning

Katy Perry chronology
Katy Hudson (2001)	Ur So Gay (2007)

Katy Hudson is the debut studio album by the American singer-songwriter Katy Hudson, later known as Katy Perry. It was released on March 6, 2001, through Red Hill Records, and was produced by Tommy Collier, Otto Price, and David Browning.

The album, unlike the subsequent albums that made her known worldwide, primarily incorporates Christian pop and Christian rock, with elements of alternative rock and pop rock, and lyrical themes of childhood, adolescence, and Hudson's faith in God. It sold between 100 and 200 copies before Red Hill went bankrupt nine months later, and received mixed reviews.

== Background ==
Growing up in a conservative household and raised by pastor parents, Hudson spent most of her childhood with gospel music, as secular music was not permitted. At the age of 15, she began pursuing a career in music, recording demos, and learning to write songs. She captured the attention of Red Hill Studios, who signed her a deal. Hudson then began working on her debut album, Katy Hudson.

== Composition ==
=== Themes and influences ===
Katy Hudson saw Hudson exploring Christian pop, Christian rock, and alternative rock. Amongst what was described as an alternative direction were prominent influences of pop rock. During an interview for her official website at the time, Hudson cited artists Jonatha Brooke, Jennifer Knapp, Diana Krall, and Fiona Apple as her musical influences. The album was described as eschewing bubblegum pop and evoking Christian pop songstresses Rachael Lampa and Jaci Velasquez.

=== Songs ===
"Trust in Me", "Naturally", and "My Own Monster" were said to capture "loneliness, fear and doubt often ascribed to teens". The first features "haunting" strings with "electronica effects" and "solid rock roots". An aggressive track, "Piercing" depicts the infatuation people have with expendable things. In "Piercing", Hudson sings: "Lord, help me see the reality / That all I'll ever need is You". "Last Call" was written by Hudson while reading the book Last Call for Help: Changing North America One Teen at a Time, written by Dawson McAllister. Musically, it sees Hudson going into a more jazz-oriented sound. Hudson described "Growing Pains" as an anthem for children and adolescents, explaining that society shares a misconstructed image of them, often viewing them as individuals who do not believe in or do not know much about God.

Hudson commented on "Search Me": "I was struggling with the fact that I would have the huge responsibility of how others would be affected through what I was doing or saying on stage. I don't want to put on some kind of front that everything is good when it's not. I wanted to keep it real, but still give people hope." The record closes with "When There's Nothing Left", which has been described as a "crisp and clean 'love note' to God".

== Release and promotion ==
Katy Hudson was released on March 6, 2001. It was a commercial failure for bankrupted Red Hill Records, only selling between 100 and 200 copies. To promote the album, Hudson embarked on Phil Joel's the Strangely Normal Tour as an opening act, with Earthsuit and V*Enna joining her. She later embarked on 46 solo performances throughout the United States.

North American solo performance dates
Date (2001)	City	Country	Venue
September 6	Sherman	United States	Austin College Auditorium
September 7	San Antonio	United States	University United Methodist Church
September 8	Abilene	United States	Hardin–Simmons University
September 9	Austin	United States	Westlake Bible Church
September 11	Wichita Falls	United States	The Wichita Theater
September 13	Dallas	United States	The Door
September 14	Norman	United States	Common Ground CoffeeHouse
September 15	Houston	United States	1st Baptist Church-Metro Worship
September 16	Bryan	United States	VFW Wall
September 19	Lubbock	United States	Indiana Avenue Baptist Church
September 21	Bartlesville	United States	Bartlesville Wesleyan College
September 22	Shiloam Springs	United States	JBU Cathedral of the Ozarks
September 23	Jonesboro	United States	First Baptist Church
September 26	Arkadelphia	United States	Ouchita Baptist University
September 28	Grove City	United States	Grove City College (Crawford Auditorium)
September 29	Grantham	United States	Messiah College (Brewbaker Auditorium)
October 3	Malibu	United States	Pepperdine University
October 6	Deerfield	United States	Trinity College
October 7	Bolingbrook	United States	Westbrook Christian Church
October 9	Upland	United States	Taylor University
October 11	Toledo	United States	University of Toledo
October 12	Dubuque	United States	Emmaus Bible College Auditorium
October 13	Wilmore	United States	Asbury College
October 14	Nashville	United States	Belcourt Theater
October 15	Nashville	United States	Belcourt Theater
October 16	Lafayette	United States	University Church at Purdue University
October 18	Bloomington	United States	Sherwood Oaks Christian
October 20	Grand Rapids	United States	Ground Floor, Res Life Church
October 21	Milwaukee	United States	Crossroads Presbyterian
October 22	New Brighton	United States	O'Shaughnessy Education Center
October 23	Sioux Falls	United States	University of Sioux Falls
October 25	Colorado Springs	United States	Vanguard Church
October 26	Boulder	United States	Flat Irons Theater
October 27	Denver	United States	Regis University Auditorium
October 28	Buena Vista	United States	Mountain Heights Baptist
October 31	Hattiesburg	United States	William Carey College (Smith Auditorium)
November 1	Gainesville	United States	Florida Theater
November 2	Tallahassee	United States	Lawton Chiles Auditorium
November 4	Orlando	United States	Wesley Foundation
November 9	West Palm	United States	Palm Beach Atlantic College
November 11	Clemson	United States	Clemson University
November 12	Montgomery	United States	The Train Shed
November 13	Auburn	United States	Auburn University
November 16	Columbia	United States	Shandon Baptist Church
November 17	Elon	United States	1st United Methodist Church of Elon
November 18	Harrisonburg	United States	Court Square Theater

=== Chart performance ===
The song "Trust in Me" spent three weeks on the Radio & Records Christian Rock chart, peaking at number 17. "Search Me" also appeared on the Christian CHR chart, spending three weeks and peaking at number 23.

== Critical reception ==
Professional ratings
Review scores
Source	Rating
AllMusic	3/5 stars
Billboard	Positive
Christianity Today	Positive
Cross Rhythms	9/10 stars
The Phantom Tollbooth	3/5 stars

The album received generally mixed reviews from critics. Stephen Thomas Erlewine from AllMusic and The Phantom Tollbooth's Andy Argyrakis awarded the record three stars out of five. Erlewine wrote that on the album, Hudson betrays "a heavy, heavy debt to Alanis Morissette". He concluded that "as an album, Katy Hudson is only instructive as the first act in a prefab pop star's career, to show that she has talent but that she was mismarketed -- and that she couldn't quite fit as a Christian singer, either, so everybody is better off with Katy tasting cherry chapstick instead of communion wine". Argyrakis stated that Hudson having been reared in church had "paid off", and noted that "Although a mere pop lightweight, it's hard to ignore Hudson's sincerity and lyrical maturity."

Christianity Today writer Russ Breimeier was positive about Katy Hudson, highlighting Hudson's songwriting style for being "insightful and well matched to the emotional power" of Hudson's music. He further deemed Hudson a "young talent" and expected to hear more from her in the next year. Similarly, Tony Cummings from Cross Rhythms also considered Hudson to be a "vocal talent", recommending readers to listen to the album and rating it nine stars out of ten. DEP from Billboard, also calling Hudson a talent, classified the record as "textured modern-rock collection that is equal parts grit and vulnerability" and "impressive".

== Aftermath ==
Katy Hudson is the only Christian music-influenced album by Hudson, who subsequently adopted the stage name Katy Perry. After her popularity increased, previously sold copies of Katy Hudson have become a sought-after item amongst her fans. On June 1, 2012, the album was released on iTunes under the R-Records label, but is no longer available. As of December 2025, Katy Hudson is available for streaming on Amazon Music in India.

During a September 2024 interview with Zane Lowe, Perry acknowledged Katy Hudson as her first album but mentioned that "it is not something I would ever play live". The album was included in the "Choose Your Own Adventure" segment of the Lifetimes Tour seven months later, along with her other albums up until Smile, where fans could select various songs to be performed.

== Track listing ==
Credits were adapted from the liner notes.

Katy Hudson track listing
No.	Title	Writer(s)	Producer(s)	Length
1.	"Trust in Me"	Katy Hudson; Mark Dickson	Otto Price	4:46
2.	"Piercing"	Hudson; Tommy Collier; Brian White	Collier	4:07
3.	"Search Me"	Hudson; Collier; Scott Faircloff	Collier	5:01
4.	"Last Call"	Hudson	David Browning	3:07
5.	"Growing Pains"	Hudson; Dickson	Browning	4:05
6.	"My Own Monster"	Hudson	Browning	5:25
7.	"Spit"	Hudson	Price	5:10
8.	"Faith Won't Fail"	Hudson; Dickson	Price	5:14
9.	"Naturally"	Hudson; Faircloff	Browning	4:33
10.	"When There's Nothing Left"	Hudson	Browning	6:45
Total length:				48:11

== Personnel ==
Credits were adapted from the liner notes.

- Katy Hudson – lead vocals (1–10), background vocals (2, 7, 8)
- Tommy Collier – production (2, 3), acoustic guitars (1), guitars (3), keyboards (2, 3), loops (2, 3)
- Otto Price – production (1, 7, 8), synthesizers (1, 7, 8), bass (1, 2, 4–10), loops (2), programming (1, 7, 8), B-3 (1, 8), additional guitars (7, 8)
- Scott Faircloff – piano (2), keyboards (2, 3), wurlitzer (3)
- David Browning – production (4–6, 9, 10), keyboards and programming (4–6, 9, 10), B-3 (7), piano (8), string arrangements (5, 9, 10)
- Chris Graffagnino – guitars (4–6, 9, 10)
- Barry Graul – electric guitars/12-str (1), guitars (7, 8)
- Tony Morra – drums (2–6, 9, 10)
- Scott Williamson – drums (7, 8)
- Greg Herrington – drums (1), additional drums (7)
- Matt Pierson – bass (3)
- Jeffrey Scot Wills – saxophone (4)
- Otto Price, III – wah guitar (8)
- David McMullan – brass (7)
- Kim Palsma – woodwinds (1, 8)
- David Davidson – violin (1, 7)
- Kristin Wilkinson – viola (1, 7)
- John Catchings – cello (1, 7)
- Mark Stuart (of Audio Adrenaline) – background vocals (1)
- Stacy Tiernan – background vocals (3)
