= Junior Sanchez =

American record producer and DJ

- Birth name: Eugenio Sanchez, Jr.
- Born: May 4, 1977 (age 48); Belleville, New Jersey, U.S.
- Origin: New York City; Ironbound, Newark, New Jersey
- Genres: Electronic, house
- Occupation(s): Disc jockey, record producer, remixer
- Labels: Virgin Records; Rufftraxx; Strictly Rhythm; Cube Recordings; Nervous; Size Records; Brobot Music

Eugenio Sanchez Jr., commonly known by his stage name Junior Sanchez, is an American record producer, DJ, remixer and record executive from New Jersey.

== Early life ==
Junior Sanchez was born in New Jersey, on May 4, 1977, and raised in the Ironbound. His family is from the state of Bahia, Brazil.

== Career ==
Sanchez has worked in the music business as a record executive president and A&R. At 17, he became A&R for the independent New Jersey label Rufftrax, signing producers James Christian and B.O.P. He also ran his own label Cube Recordings which released material from Felix Da Housecat, Steve Mac, Paul Woolford, and DJ Sneak, and was also President of A&R for various label's Junior now operates his own record label "Brobot Records" distributed by Armada Music.

Junior has released original music under these names or aliases: The Controllers [w/ Steve Mac], S-Men [W/ DJ Sneak + Roger Sanchez], Da Mongoloids [A DJ Collective w/ Armand Van Helden, Daft Punk, DJ Sneak, Roger Sanchez, Todd Terry, Ian Pooley, Laidback Luke, Basement Jaxx, and The Rhythm Masters], Da Shapeshifta Project [W/ Harry "Choo Choo" Romero], Dark Heads [W/ Dave Carlucci], Nitebreed [W/ Harry "Choo Choo" Romero], Output/Teletronik [W/ Chris Haliani], Riot Society [W/ Laidback Luke + Chris Haliani], and Subspecies [W/ Armand Van Helden].

Writing collaborations include Azealia Banks, Katy Perry, Stuart Price, Armand Van Helden, Thomas Bangalter, Ima Robot, Claude Kelly, Crookers, Stacy Barthe, Morningwood, Green Velvet, Mýa, Michelle Bell, Soshy, Princess Superstar, Bush, Bryce Wilson, and Good Charlotte.

Production and remixes include Daft Punk, Madonna, Shakira, Katy Perry, Ariana Grande, Good Charlotte, Placebo, The Bravery, Gorillaz, Blaqk Audio, Hot Hot Heat, Róisín Murphy, Felix Da Housecat, The Faint, New Order, Emiliana Torrini, Jamiroquai, Giorgio Moroder, Moving Units, Les Rhythmes Digitales.

== Discography ==
=== Compilations ===
- SubSpecies* / Junior Sanchez – From Da East / Da Bionic Trax (CD, Comp) Rhythm Republic 1996

=== DJ mixes ===
- Cube Recordings (CD) DJ Magazine 2001
- Seize The Fewcha Nervous Records 2011

=== Singles and extended plays ===
- "Alive at Night" (featuring Ineabell)
- "Deeper Love" (with Sultan & Ned Shepard)
- "Without You" (with CeCe Peniston)
- "Salt" (vs. Bad Suns)
- Dave Carlucci & Junior Sanchez – Rufftrax On Wax (EP) | Rufftrack Records 1994
- Dave Carlucci & Junior Sanchez – The Guardian Of Ruff EP (12", EP) | Rufftrack Records 1994
- Harry "Choo Choo" Romero & Junior Sanchez – Bad Little Kiddies | Gossip Records 1996
- Da Bionic Trax | Strictly Rhythm 1996
- Da Shape Of Da 80s | Narcotic Records 1998
- Rhythm Masters And Junior Sanchez – Da New Age Funksters | Junior London 1999
- 2Morrows Future 2Day (2x12") | R-Senal 1999
- Old Tracky Bastard (12") | Armed Records 1999
- The Man-E-Facez EP | Yoshitoshi Recordings 2000
- Junior Sanchez Featuring Angie Johnson – That Girl Ain't Right | R-Senal 2000
- Junior Sanchez & Rhythm Masters Are New Age Funkstas – Rock Your Body (12") | Cube Recordings 2000
- Armand Van Helden & Junior Sanchez – Stanton Music Sampler No. 1 Stanton Magnetics, LLC 2000
- Junior Sanchez Feat. Dajae* – B With U 3345 Recordings 1999
- Executes Cubizm 1.0 (12") Cube Recordings CUB 01 2000
- Junior Sanchez and Christian Smith – R United Cube Recordings 2001
- Dancin Next To Me (12") Not On Label JUNBUG 01 2001
- Junior Sanchez and Rhythm Masters – Are New Age Funkstars (12") House Works 2001
- Steve Mac and Junior Sanchez – The Controllers (Essential DJ Toolz) Dis-Funktional Recordings 2001
- Superincumbent / I Wanna Rock! (12", W/Lbl) Cube Recordings ZCUB 14 2003
- Neoteric Version 1 (12") Cube Recordings CUB 14 2003
- The Last Dance (12") Big & Dirty BADR.002 2005
- Junior Sanchez Feat. Good Charlotte – Elevator (12") Rise RISE 492 2010
- Harry Romero*, Junior Sanchez & Alexander Technique Feat Shawnee Taylor – Where You Are (12") Sneakerz Muzik 2011
- Dim Mak Attack EP (3xFile, MP3, EP, 320) Dim Mak Records DM 293 2012
- Junior Sanchez featuring CeCe Peniston* – Without You (File, MP3, Single, 320) Size Records 2014
- Junior Sanchez with Todd Terry – Figure Of Jazz (Freeze Records) 2018
- Junior Sanchez – Fundamentals EP (Stmpd Rcrds) 2018
- Todd Terry and Junior Sanchez – Figure of Jazz (Freeze Records) 2019
- Junior Sanchez – Without Your Love (Armada Music) 2019
- Junior Sanchez – Blueprint EP (Kaluki Musik) 2019
- Junior Sanchez – Hard to Resist (Too Many Rules) 2019
- Junior Sanchez – Everyday EP (Circus Recordings) 2019
- Junior Sanchez and Boris – Move It (Saved Records) 2020
- Junior Sanchez featuring Lee Wilson – Music So Special (Undisputed Music) 2021

=== Remixes ===
- 1998: Daft Punk - "Revolution 909" (Roger & Junior's Revolutionary War Mix)
- 2007: Gorillaz - "DARE" (DARE - Junior Sanchez Remix)
- 2019: Huxley and Javi Bora – "You're Everything" (Junior Sanchez Remix)
- 2019: Chris Willis and Lenny Fontana – "Top of the World" (Junior Sanchez Remix)

=== Miscellaneous ===
- Harry Romero, Junior Sanchez & Alexander Technique Feat Shawnee Taylor – Where You Are (3xFile, MP3, 320) Size Records 2010
- Junior Sanchez featuring Karmen – I Believe In (Remixes) (2xFile, MP3, 320) Size Records 2011
- Junior Sanchez featuring Karmen – I Believe In (3xFile, MP3, 320) Size Records 2011
- Junior Sanchez and Bad Suns – Salt (File, MP3, 320) Size Records 2014
- Junior Sanchez and Sultan & Shepard – Deeper Love (File, MP3, 320) Size Records 2014
