= D'Penguineers =

FIRST Robotics Competition 1717 - D'Penguineers
- Full name: Raytheon / Valley Precision Products / Allergan Foundation / Las Cumbres Observatory Global Telescope / ATK Space / Enerpro, Inc. / Tecolote Research, Inc. / Lockheed Martin / FLIR Systems / AFAR Communications Inc. / The Neal Feay Company/ Montecito Bank and Trust / Venoco Inc. / Impulse Inc. / Lynda.com/ Santa Barbara County ROP & Dos Pueblos High School Engineering Academy/
- Nickname(s): D'Penguineers
- Organization: Dos Pueblos High School; Dos Pueblos Engineering Academy
- Director: Amir Abo-Shaeer
- Events attended: Los Angeles; San Diego; Arizona; Sacramento; Galileo Division (FIRST Championship); Curie Division (FIRST Championship)
- Events results: 2007: San Diego Regional Finalist; 2008: San Diego Regional Winner; Los Angeles Regional Winner; Championship Division Finalist; 2009: Sacramento Regional Winner; Los Angeles Regional Finalist; Championship Division Finalist; 2010: San Diego Regional Finalist; Los Angeles Regional Winner; Championship Division QF; 2011: San Diego Regional SF; Los Angeles Regional Finalist; Championship Qualified
- Best result: Championship Division Finalists (2008, 2009)
- Website: DPEngineering.org

Team 1717, D’Penguineers, were a FIRST Robotics team associated with the Dos Pueblos High School Engineering Academy (DPEA) in Goleta, California. D’Penguineers have won multiple awards at the regional and international levels of the FIRST Robotics Competition, and participate regularly in outreach programs for junior high and elementary schools. The team was highlighted in the book The New Cool.

== History ==
Team 1717, consisting of the 32-student senior class of the DPEA, began their first season during the 2005-2006 school year, under the direction of DPEA founder and director, Amir Abo-Shaeer. Since then, D’Penguineers have participated annually in the FIRST Robotics Competition, developing new techniques for student education, team communication, team collaboration, and build season preparation. Abo-Shaeer received a Macarthur Foundation award in 2010 for his work with the school and the team. Team 1717 was disbanded after the 2015 season.

== Pre-build season ==
Preparations for the robotics build season begin at the launch of the school year, where Team 1717 students take both an Advanced Engineering class and an ROP FIRST Robotics class. During the months leading up to the competition, students begin to specialize, in areas such as computer programming, CAD, electronics, and machining working with mentors from the surrounding community. Throughout the year, the students are exposed not only to this educational specialization, but they also learn to manage the business aspects of the team—they also make up presentation teams, apparel managers, travel planners, and account managers, among others. The process of the actual creation of a robot, from initial brainstorms to paper planning to physical building, is a concept foreign to most high school students, and the pre-build season is devoted to developing the skills and team unity necessary to have a successful build season.

== Build season ==
The FIRST Robotics Competition begins in January, when the game is revealed, and continues for six weeks, until the completed robot is shipped. Team 1717 assembles to watch the game video, and the build season is off to a running start. Over the following six weeks, each student on Team 1717 will spend over 360 hours working to collectively design, build, and program their game robot, as well as strategize and organize to find the most effective way to play the game.

== Competitions ==
Once the Team 1717's bot has been shipped, D’Penguineers attend regional FIRST Robotics Competitions and compete for their chance to go to the international FIRST Championship. In past years, Team 1717 has attended regional competitions in San Diego, Los Angeles, Sacramento, and Arizona, and has qualified for the FIRST Championship in Atlanta, Georgia for three consecutive years.

== Book ==
Team 1717 is also the subject of the book The New Cool, written by Neal Bascomb. The movie rights have been acquired by Walt Disney Motion Pictures Group, who are developing the book into a screenplay. The movie is set to be directed by Michael Bacall.

== Awards ==
- 2006 Southern California Regional: Rookie All-Star
- 2006 Arizona Regional: Rookie Inspiration Award
- 2007 San Diego Regional: Imagery Award, Regional Finalist
- 2008 San Diego Regional: Delphi “Driving Tomorrow’s Technology”, Regional Winner
- 2008 Los Angeles Regional: Delphi “Driving Tomorrow’s Technology”, Regional Winner
- 2008 FIRST Championship: Finalist - Galileo Division
- 2009 Sacramento Regional: Quality Award sponsored by Motorola, Regional Winner
- 2009 Los Angeles Regional: Industrial Design Award sponsored by General Motors, Regional Finalist
- 2009 FIRST Championship: Quality Award sponsored by Motorola, Finalist - Galileo Division
- 2010 San Diego Regional: FIRST Dean’s List Finalist Award, Quality Award sponsored by Motorola, Regional Finalist
- 2010 Los Angeles Regional: Engineering Inspiration Award, Regional Winner
- 2010 FIRST Championship: Quality Award sponsored by Motorola
- 2011 San Diego Regional: Quality Award sponsored by Motorola
- 2011 Los Angeles Regional: Engineering Excellence Award sponsored by Delphi, Regional Finalist
- 2012 Los Angeles Regional: Regional Winner
- 2012 Central Valley Regional: Innovation in Control Award sponsored by Rockwell Automation, Regional Winner
- 2012 FIRST Championship: Creativity Award sponsored by Xerox
- 2013 Los Angeles Regional: Regional Winner
- 2013 Las Vegas Regional: Regional Winner
- 2013 Las Vegas Regional: Industrial Design Award sponsored by General Motors
- 2013 FIRST Championship: Rockwell Automation in Control Award
- 2014 Los Angeles Regional: Regional Winner
- 2014 Las Vegas Regional: Regional Finalist
- 2014 Los Angeles Regional: Engineering Excellence Award sponsored by Delphi
- 2014 Las Vegas Regional: Industrial Design Award sponsored by General Motors
- 2014 FIRST Championship: General Motors Industrial Design Award.
- 2015 Ventura Regional: Regional Winner
- 2015 Ventura Regional: Innovation in Control Award sponsored by Rockwell Automation
- 2015 FIRST Championship: Innovation in Control Award sponsored by Rockwell Automation
