= The New Cool (book) =

The New Cool: A Visionary Teacher, His FIRST Robotics Team, and the Ultimate Battle of Smarts
- Cover of hardcover edition
- Author: Neal Bascomb
- Language: English
- Genre: Non-fiction
- Publisher: Crown
- Publication date: 2011
- Publication place: United States
- Pages: 352
- ISBN: 978-0-307-58889-0
- OCLC: 641997964

The New Cool: A Visionary Teacher, His FIRST Robotics Team, and the Ultimate Battle of Smarts is a 2011 non-fiction narrative book by American writer Neal Bascomb. It follows four FIRST Robotics Competition (FRC) teams through the course of the 2009 season. Its main subject, however, is Team 1717 and the exploits of its students and its head mentor Amir Abo-Shaeer; the other teams followed were teams 217, 395, and 67, from Sterling Heights, Michigan, New York City, and Milford, Michigan respectively.

== Summary ==
The book begins with a prologue set at the 2009 FIRST Championship in Atlanta and describes the exciting environment there. It then switches back to the kickoff event in January 2009 and describes Dean Kamen and how he founded FIRST. Afterwards, it details the history of team 1717 and the program that it is a part of, the Dos Pueblos Engineering Academy. Then the book describes how the 2009 team winds its way through a 6-week build season, enduring many struggles from mechanical failures to a bout of sickness. A chapter is dedicated to team 217, the Thunderchickens, who attempt to construct a robot with military style precision, and to team 395, 2TrainRobotics, whose students must deal with issues related to being in the poor inner city, as well as to team 67, Heroes of Tomorrow. After the build season, team 1717 competes in two regional competitions, Los Angeles and Sacramento. The team loses in the finals at Los Angeles, and wins in Sacramento after going undefeated. 1717 then competes in the FIRST Championship, where it loses to a heavily favored team, 111 WildStang, in the division finals.

== Reviews ==
Science historian Robert P. Crease wrote in the Wall Street Journal that The New Cool "is effective in capturing the students' loyalty, dedication and ingenuity." Popular book blog Bookin' with Bingo called The New Cool "an important book for everyone but especially those who are interested in our educational goals for today and the future." FIRST has promoted the book at the FRC kickoff and its regional competitions. James Floyd Kelly of Wired stated that "any students or adults considering jumping into FRC for the first time should read this book."

Kate Vander Wiede of the Christian Science Monitor panned the book, stating that "the book fails to resonate" and "doesn't do...justice" to FIRST or Team 1717.

== Film adaptation ==
According to Dean Kamen at the FIRST Championship, a screenplay based on the book is being written. The rights to the book have been optioned to Scott Rudin through the Walt Disney Motion Pictures Group. The film is being directed by Michael Bacall.
