= Dos Pueblos High School =

Public high school in California, United States

Coordinates: 34.43812°N 119.87876°W

Location
- 7266 Alameda Avenue; Goleta, California 93117; United States

Information
- Type: Public
- Motto: Ex fide fortis (Latin: From loyalty, strength)
- Established: 1966
- School district: Santa Barbara Unified School District
- Principal: Bill Woodard
- Teaching staff: 92.29 (FTE)
- Grades: 9-12
- Enrollment: 2,075 (2023-2024)
- Student to teacher ratio: 22.48
- Campus size: 182 Acres
- Color: Navy Vegas Gold
- Athletics conference: CIF Southern Section; Channel League
- Nickname: Chargers
- Rivals: Santa Barbara High School; San Marcos High School
- Newspaper: The Charger Account
- Website: www.dphs.org

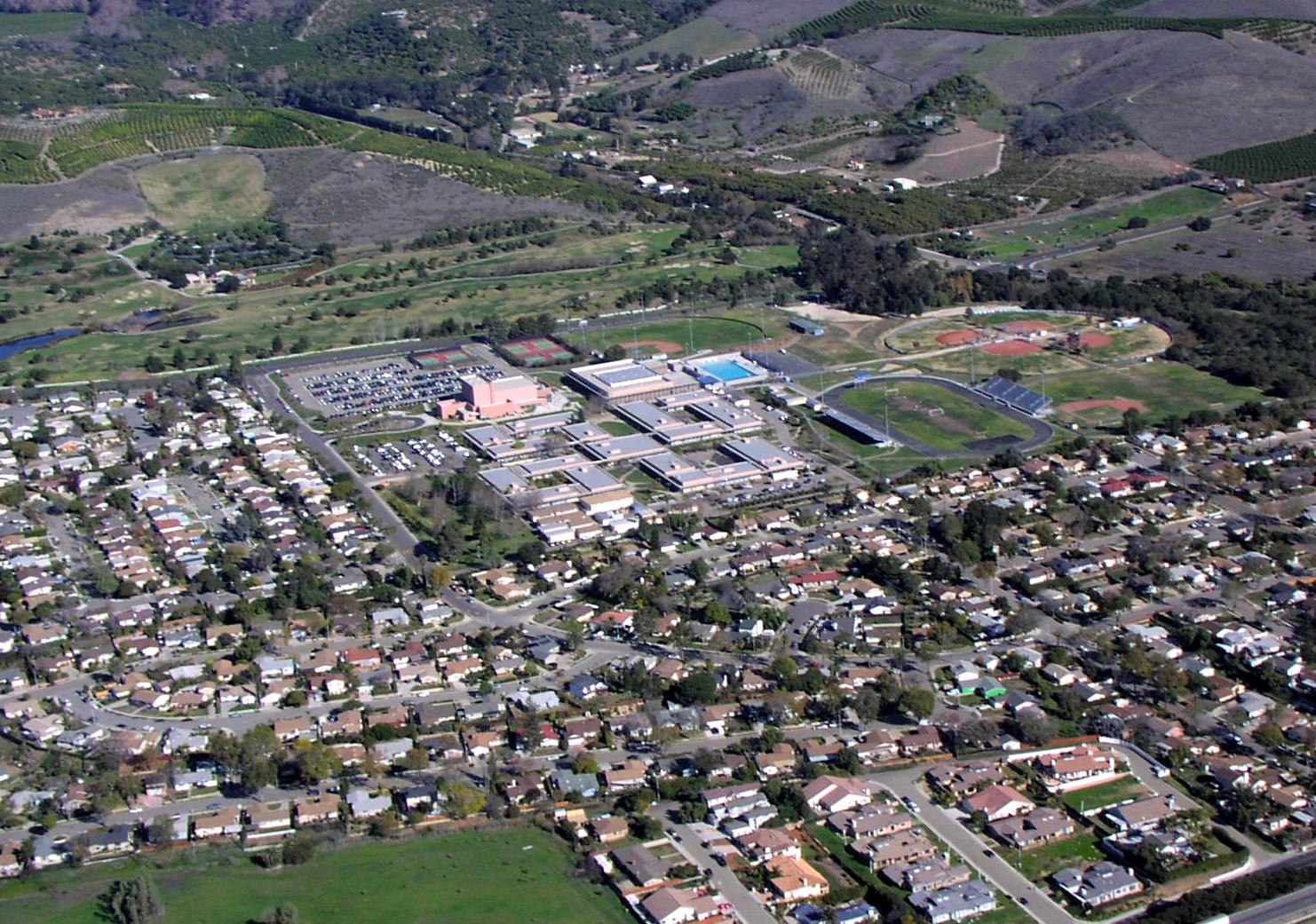
Dos Pueblos High School in Goleta, California

Dos Pueblos High School is a public high school located in Goleta, California, northwest of Santa Barbara. Located adjacent to the foothills on the edge of the Goleta Valley in an area known as El Encanto Heights, it serves a student body of approximately 2,100 in grades 9-12. It is one of three comprehensive high schools in the Santa Barbara Unified School District.

Dos Pueblos High School, ("DP" or "DPHS"), is a National Blue Ribbon School. Dos Pueblos' school mascot is the "Charger" as well as Charlie the Charger Horse. The school has undergone recent renovations including finishing of the football stadium, as well as the building of a Broadway-sized theater, an Olympic size pool, and a 12,000-square-foot (1,100 m^{2}) engineering facility.

In 2012, Newsweek ranked Dos Pueblos High School as 597 within the top 1000 high schools in America, and 127 in the state of California. Newsweek based its ranking on several criteria, including its graduation rate (93%), percentage of graduates attending college (95%), number of AP/IB tests per student (0.5), average AP test score (3.4), average SAT score (1690), average ACT score (26.5), and the percentage of students receiving subsidized lunches (28%). Dos Pueblos is considered the best high school in the Santa Barbara area by a wide margin.

== Student ethnicity ==
During the 2021–2022 school year, there were 2,007 students. 41% were White (not Hispanic), 45% were Hispanic or Latino, 5% were Asian, and 8% were "other".

== Academic programs ==
Dos Pueblos is home to the Engineering Academy; the majority of students participate in a curriculum that includes vocational, college preparation, and Advanced Placement courses.

=== Dos Pueblos Engineering Academy ===
The Dos Pueblos Engineering Academy is a four-year program at Dos Pueblos High School, founded by MacArthur Fellowship winner Amir Abo-Shaeer. The Engineering Academy offers classes in machining, physics, industrial design, programming, and CAD. The Engineering Academy follows a philosophy of project-based learning; over the course of four years, students complete many projects including a mobile, a light sculpture, and a Kinetic Sculpture. During their senior year, students design a mechatronics art installation for display in the Bay Area Maker Faire. In the past, the seniors built a robot to compete in the FIRST Robotics Competition. The (now retired) FIRST team, the D'Penguineers, won several regional competitions and was a regional division finalist in 2008. The Dos Pueblos Engineering Academy's robotics program was the subject of the book The New Cool by Neal Bascomb. In 2010, construction began on a $6 million, 12,000 sq ft building to house the DPEA. Previously, the DPEA had been housed in a small classroom and only accepted 30 students. In 2011, the new building was completed and the DPEA now accepts 104 incoming freshmen.

=== International Baccalaureate Programme ===
DPHS students can participate in the International Baccalaureate Programme, a program that provides students with an opportunity to pursue liberal arts curriculum that is recognized by many colleges and universities. The IB program (as it is commonly known) is particularly popular with those with more general academic interests than the Engineering Academy or other programs can provide.

=== Dos Pueblos Mock Trial Program ===
The Dos Pueblos mock trial program gained prominence in 1984, winning the California state championship in that year and again in 1987. Under the coaching of teacher Ken Larson and attorney coach Chris Kroes, the Dos Pueblos team won several county championships in the 1980s and 1990s with second-place state finishes in 1993, 1994 and 1996. Under coach Bill Woodard (2008–2014), Dos Pueblos won Santa Barbara County titles in 2009, '10, '11 (tied with San Marcos High School), '12, and '13 and finished 13th, 5th, 8th, 2nd, and 9th at state respectively. DP finished second at the 2012 Empire World Invitational—losing in the championship round by a single ballot. A return trip to Empire in 2013 ended with a 4th place world ranking. In 2015, DP's Mock Trial program won first place in the World Championships at Empire. In 2016, the team took home the state championship title, for the first time in 29 years. In 2022, the team placed third at Empire's "Camden Yards Classic" competition in Baltimore, then later in that season they placed second at the California state finals before winning the inaugural Empire Spring Premier League tournament in May and June 2023. The following year, in 2024, they placed seventh in the California state finals, and then placed second in the same Empire Spring Premier League. The next school year, in Fall 2024, they won first place at the Empire Constitution Classic in Philadelphia, PA, and then went on to win third place in the California state finals, with an undefeated record.

=== Science Bowl ===
In April 2010, Dos Pueblos finished 13th in the nation after making it into the "Sweet 16" in the U.S. Department of Energy's National Science Bowl competition in Washington, D.C. United States Secretary of Energy Steven Chu presented the award of a $1,000 check to the Dos Pueblos High School team, including captain Ilan Goodman, Nicholas Su, Sean Risser, Felix Li, Anjian Wu and Coach Chris Jones. In 2008, Dos Pueblos School's Science Bowl was founded and run by John J. Kim for 2 years. Dos Pueblos team took top honors in regional competition in 2008 and 2009, and advanced to the national finals in 2009. On their first appearance in 2008, the DP team took 2nd place in the Kern County Regional Science Bowl. In 2009, the team placed first out of 32 teams in the U.S. Department of Energy's regional Science Bowl competition in Kern County.

=== Economics Challenge and Capital Markets Contest ===
Dos Pueblos High School had a successful run in the 2009 Capital Markets contests. One team went to the Los Angeles County competition on Wednesday and another team to the Orange County competition. The Los Angeles team took third place in a close contest, and the Orange County team took first place on the competitive field. Our Orange County champions (all juniors) are, Philip A. Bildner (Cal-Berkeley), Da-bin Ryu (Harvard), Nick Su (Stanford), and Anjian Wu (Caltech).

The Dos Pueblos team also won the 2010 Los Angeles Capital Markets Contest. The team consisted of Haley Araki, Owen Chen, Richard Cheng, and Peter Shao for the Los Angeles Capital Markets Contest on May 27 at the Federal Reserve Bank in Los Angeles. Roland Lewin is the students’ coach/economics teacher. The contest enables students to learn basic economic principles through stock trading and financial analysis, and challenges them to draw conclusions and provide recommendations for addressing national economic issues.

== Media programs ==
=== The Image ===
The Image Yearbook Staff is a program on campus. The Image has been awarded and recognized nationally: 2008-2013 Look Book Feature, 2012 CSPA Gold Crown Award, 2012 NSPA Best of Show San Antonio, 2012-2013 Book Look Highlighted Book, 2013 CSPA Silver Crown Award, 2013 Design of the Year-Jostens Design Contest, 2013 NSPA First Place; with four marks of Distinction, 2014 NSPA Best of Show San Diego, 2015 NSPA Best of Show Denver. Students work as staff members and editors to produce an annual yearbook on Jostens, an online publication platform. The Image boasts a social media following of over one-third of the school's population.

== Performing arts ==
The campus features a 749-seat theater, the Elings Performing Arts Center, which was completed and named in 2007 after the donor, Dr. Virgil Elings. The Dos Pueblos Theatre Company produces various performances, including shows written and directed by students.

== Athletics ==
The school participates in the Channel League within the CIF Southern Section.

== Notable alumni ==
- Alex Filippenko (class of 1976) — astrophysicist and professor of astronomy at the University of California, Berkeley
- Chip Foose — owner of Foose Design and former star of the reality TV series Overhaulin
- Tyler Fredrickson — NFL player for the Oakland Raiders and Washington Redskins, later a contestant on Survivor's 30th season
- Meg Gardiner — Edgar Award-winning author and best-selling novelist primarily of thrillers, and crime procedurals
- Malynda Hale — Singer, Actress, Activist
- Samantha Hill — 2016 Olympic Gold medalist in women's water polo
- Ben Howland — former head coach of the UCLA Bruins men's basketball team and Mississippi State
- Robin Lim - midwife and the founder of Yayasan Bumi Sehat
- James McCann — starting catcher for the New York Mets and a 2019 MLB All-Star
- Howard McGillin — two-time Tony Award-nominated stage actor and singer and three-time Drama Desk nominee; holds record for portraying "Phantom of the Opera" on Broadway more than 2,500 times; also performed on London's West End, in films and TV
- Ryan Mendez — guitarist for the band Yellowcard
- Larry Moriarty — football player for Notre Dame and in the NFL
- Kiley Neushul — 2016 Olympic Gold medalist in women's water polo
- Steve Odom — football player for Utah and in the NFL
- Douglas Partie — member of United States men's national volleyball team that won gold medal at 1988 Summer Olympics
- Katy Perry - American singer and songwriter who has received various awards, including four Guinness World Records, five American Music Awards, a Brit Award, and a Juno Award
- Jeffrey Peterson — businessman and computer programmer, founder of Quepasa
- Derrick Plourde — drummer, musician and artist, member of Lagwagon
- Scott Randall — former professional baseball player (Cincinnati Reds)
- Stephen Randolph — former professional baseball player (Arizona Diamondbacks, Houston Astros)
- Ben Rattray — creator and CEO of change.org as well as one of Time Magazine's 100 most influential people
- Kyle Shotwell — football player for Cal Poly and in the NFL with the Kansas City Chiefs
- John Snowling — mass shooter and Ventura County police officer
- Patricia Soltysik — Symbionese Liberation Army member
- Gabe Speier — MLB pitcher
- Julyan Stone — former NBA player for the Denver Nuggets and Toronto Raptors
- Kim Wilson — blues singer and harmonica player, most notably with the Fabulous Thunderbirds
