= Malynda Hale =

American singer-songwriter

- Born: Malynda R. Hale; August 21, 1986 (age 40); Santa Barbara, California, US
- Genres: Pop, soul, singer-songwriter
- Occupations: Actress, singer, director
- Years active: 2007–present
- Label: Second Season Music Group
- Website: www.malyndahale.com
Malynda Hale
- Education: Dos Pueblos High School ('03); Azusa Pacific University ('07)

Malynda Hale (born August 21, 1986) is an American actor, Singer, and political activist. She is the former host of #WeNeedToTalk Podcast and creator of The Black Voices Heard Project. She is also the owner of JMV Entertainment Production Company based in Los Angeles and the Executive Director of The New Evangelicals.

== Early life ==
Hale was born and raised in Santa Barbara, California to Diane Hale and James Hale. She is the younger of two daughters. Hale was raised in the AME church where she began singing at the age of 5. She started playing piano at age 7 and writing her own songs at 9 years old. She participated in school choir, school theatre productions and community theatre productions throughout high school. She was the lead in two high school productions and had supporting roles the other two years. After graduating from Dos Pueblos High School in 2003, Hale attended Azusa Pacific University where she majored in vocal performance (opera) with a minor in musical theater. Hale has stated numerous times that opera training has given her the stamina to perform pop music for longer periods of time. During her junior year of college, Hale took a semester off to perform live and work on an album. She performed at reputable venues in Los Angeles to gain experience. She returned to Azusa Pacific University the following year to complete her degree. She graduated in 2007 with a bachelor's degree in vocal performance and a minor in musical theatre at the age of 20.

== Career ==
=== 2007–2008: Career beginnings and From My Heart to Yours ===
During her senior year of college, Hale met Producer J.T. Meskiel of The Document Room where she recorded a 5-song EP. She then took the EP to Producer, Stewart Cararas and made an 8-song album entitled From My Heart to Yours. She released the album in March 2007. Following her release, Malynda performed throughout Los Angeles and Las Vegas. She opened for acclaimed singer-songwriters Ernie Halter and Tyrone Wells at The House of Blues at Mandalay Bay and had a headlining show at Treasure Island Hotel and Casino. She also became the face of Avanya Minerals, a vegan makeup company, but the company later dissolved one year later.

=== 2008–2009: No More Tears, New York and Flat Rock Playhouse ===
In 2008 Malynda signed with management group Electric Shoes Music Group and began working on her second EP entitled No More Tears. This EP was released in January 2009. Following her release, she performed at more venues in Los Angeles including Molly Malone's, Tangier, and Room 5. In July 2009, Hale relocated to New York City where she took a break from music to pursue musical theatre. Within three months of living in New York, Malynda joined the Actor's Equity Association and was cast in her first equity show in North Carolina at Flat Rock Playhouse. She originated the role of Jackie Noles in a brand new production titled, It Happened One Christmas. The show featured an ensemble cast of 6 including Tony Award Winner Jarrod Emmick and music by Jeremy Schonfeld. While living in New York, Malynda taught music at the Stagecoach Performing Arts school on the Upper East Side.

=== 2010–2012: Lost Lady With a Violin and The Train Ride Home ===
In 2010 Malynda traveled back to Los Angeles to participate in the world premiere performance of Lost Lady with a Violin written by Laurie Whitaker. This performance took place at The El Portal Theatre in North Hollywood, California. It starred many well known Los Angeles theatre actors.

Upon returning to New York, Malynda teamed up with producer/songwriter Lena Leon to begin work on her next album. They co-wrote three songs together and teamed up with lyricist Shawn Lopes for two songs, with Hale writing the remainder of the album on her own. The majority of the album was recorded in Leon's studio in New York. Part way through production of the album, Malynda added producer/engineer Kevin Porter of Germano Studios to the project. While recording, Hale performed at notable venues in New York such as The Bitter End and National Underground.

In April 2012, after a year and a half of recording and writing, Malynda officially released The Train Ride Home. The album received high praise from numerous publications including Music Connection Magazine, Damn Good Tunes, The Hollywood Examiner and Blog Critics. She also became a voting member of The Recording Academy.

=== 2012–2014: Chicago and other endeavors ===
Hale relocated to Chicago in January 2012 to be with her now husband while he attended law school at the University of Chicago. While in Chicago, Hale signed with talent agency Actors Talent Group and pursued acting in addition to music. Hale performed at numerous venues including The Elbo Room, Schubas Tavern and Next Door Chicago.

In August 2012 Hale was cast in the Marriott Lincolnshire production of Dreamgirls. The production ran for 8 weeks with a total of 8 shows per week. Immediately following the show's closing, Hale was cast as a supporting role in her first feature film, Oranges written and produced by Corrina Crade and directed by Elen Santana. The film starred Brant Daughterty and Crade as the lead couple. Hale also co-wrote the theme song for the movie entitled "Flashback" with Lena Leon.

In January 2013 Hale was picked to be the lead in the independent feature film The 4th Meeting. It later debuted at the Black Harvest Film Festival and won two awards at the African American Arts Alliance of Chicago awards. Hale took home the award for Best Actress in Film and The 4th Meeting won best film.

Later in 2013 Hale was chosen along with 5 other girls to be the face of the "My Black is Beautiful" campaign created by Procter and Gamble. She was picked to represent Queen Latifah's makeup line with CoverGirl, The Queen Collection. The ads ran for two years in Ebony, Jet and Essence magazines. Following her success with the "My Black is Beautiful" campaign, Hale signed an endorsement deal with vegan makeup company Valana Minerals. She is currently the spokesperson for the brand that caters to women of color. In 2013 Hale returned to Los Angeles to continue working in music and film. She was awarded the ASCAP Plus Award for Independent Artists and Top Singer-Songwriter for the Independent Artists Network Awards by Gighive.

Throughout 2014 Hale took part in numerous film and TV projects including co-starring as Nurse Lisa on TLC's Sex Sent Me To ER. She joined the hosting world and became a co-host for The Vampire Diaries After Show on The Stream.TV as well as the lead host for The Walking Dead After Show.

=== 2015–2017: Pieces of Me and other projects ===
At the start of the year Hale began to work on her fourth studio album with Kevin Porter of Flashgrove Music. She also hired producer Darren "BabyDeeBeats" Smith to produce two songs on the album. The album titled Pieces of Me was released on October 20, 2015, and is described as her most personal album to date. Pieces of Me is a collection of songs that each capture specific moments in Hale's life. The lead single "Gray" was popularly received followed by audience favorite "Falling", that was written as a tribute to Leelah Alcorn. "Falling" was nominated for a 2016 Hollywood Music in Media Award in the Adult Contemporary/Triple AAA Category.

Prior to her album release, Hale was interviewed by Forbes magazine, along with Andy Grammer and Soleil Moone Frye for being a top artist and social media influencer on the app Flipagram. She was also featured in commercials for OnStar and Heineken. Hale is one of several women featured in the commercial for Heineken which not only won the 2015 Cannes Lion Marketer of the Year Award but went on to garner global acclaim for its message promoting responsibility and moderation in a unique way. Hale also participated in several short films and independent films. Medley, directed by Diego Londono, was accepted into the short film circuit at Cannes and Appreciation, directed by Michael Krehan, was accepted into the Capital City Black Film Festival and the San Diego Black Film Festival. Additionally she had a role in the film A Father's Secret starring Willa Ford that debuted on Lifetime Movie Network on June 19, 2016.

In August 2015 Hale was asked to sing the national anthem at the StubHub Center for the LA Galaxy. This marks the second time Hale has performed the national anthem for a sporting event, having sung the national anthem at the Staples Center for the LA Sparks in 2008 she has also performed the national anthem for the Robert F. Kennedy Young Democratic Awards as well as the Amgen Tour of California.

At the start of 2016 Hale was named a Top 10 Finalist in the Grammy Amplifier competition sponsored by Hyundai beating out thousands of contestants with her song, "Falling". She also appeared on KCAL 9 (CBS Los Angeles) to promote her album Pieces of Me and on NBC news as an Emerging artist through Flipagram. In October 2016 she was nominated for two Independent Music Awards, Best Adult Contemporary Album and Best Adult Contemporary Song and two Hollywood Music in Media Awards where she won for Best Female Vocalist. In January 2017 she was a headliner at the NAMM Show. She was nominated for four awards in three categories at the Indie Music Channel Awards in April 2017 and won for Best Pop Music Video. In May 2017 she was nominated for two Josie Music Awards: Pop/Contemporary Category for Artist/Group of the Year and Pop/Contemporary Category for Song of the Year for her song "Stand". She won for Pop/Contemporary Song of the Year.

Malynda is currently a regular soloist at The Sayers Club Hollywood Sessions night on Thursdays and is a member of the Sunset Singers Group the Starlets. In September 2017 she launched a brand new podcast called Boss, Please! with fellow co-hosts Jillian Leff & Meghan Lamontagne. The podcast is focused on female bosses and promotes female empowerment. Previous guests have included comedians Wendy Liebman & Dana Goldberg, Actress Daffany Clark from the hit Freeform show The Fosters, Publicist Heather Besignano, Celebrity Photographer Brie Childers, and Mandy Teefey Executive Producer of the Netflix show 13 Reasons Why. After two seasons on the show, Hale decided to leave to pursue other ventures.

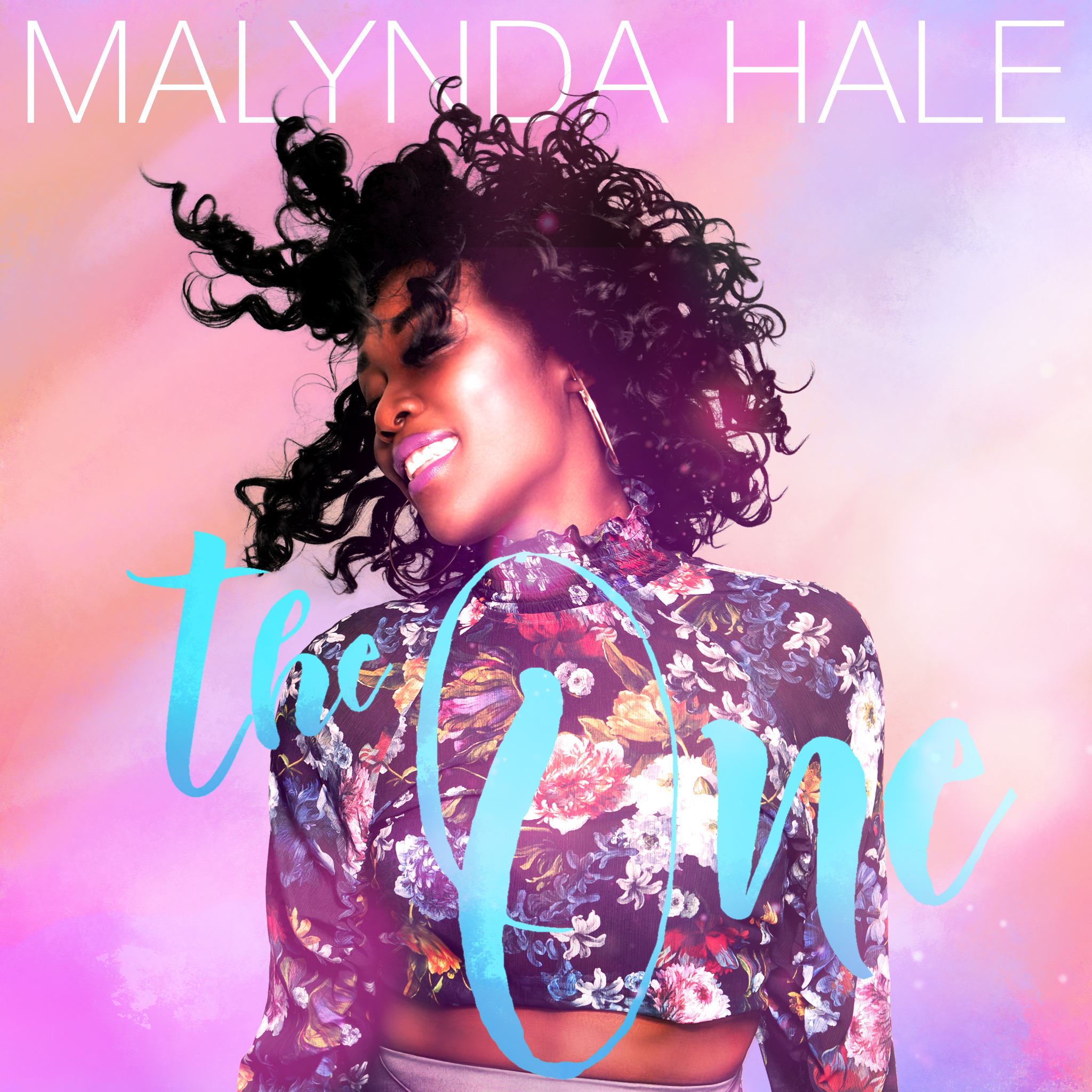
The One EP Cover

=== 2018–2019: The One and #WeNeedToTalk ===
In June 2018 Malynda released a 5-song EP entitled The One through her label Second Season Music Group. The EP received critical acclaim as the singer's best work to date. She was also featured on the cover of Avante Magazine. She appeared on The Jam TV show in Chicago on WCIU to promote her lead single off the EP, "Something Worth Fighting For" and also performed and was interviewed on the Spanish Talk show Noches Con Platanito. On August 19, 2018, she opened for the popular boy band OTOWN from MTV's series Making the Band, at the legendary Los Angeles Venue The Troubadour.

In November 2018, Hale launched a live panel discussion series entitled #WeNeedToTalk to bring people together to discuss important topics. The panel discussion series is a quarterly discussion series hosted at Harmony Toluca Lake. Through these discussion series it has been her hope to shine light on issues that society needs to discuss. The panel series then led to the launch of her weekly podcast in early 2019 of the same name with her co-host, comedian and entrepreneur, Karmel Humphrey. She launched the blog to coincide with the podcast in September 2019.

In Spring 2019, she released a new single called "The La La Song" written for her husband, followed by her single "Story" that shines light on the homelessness problem in America. In May 2019, Malynda teamed up with songwriter Briana Cash to release "Ancestral Sin". Cash sought Hale out to record the song after seeing her perform at The W Hotel last year.

In Summer of 2019 Malynda had the honor of opening for Smokey Robinson at the Mid-State Fair in Paso Robles through the music agency Sunset Singers. Following a well received performance, Malynda went on to headline the Official Animal Rights March in Downtown LA, perform the National Anthem for the California Democratic Party Convention and honor legendary songwriter Diane Warren at the Hollywood Music and Media awards.

=== 2020–2022: #WeNeedToTalk and Black Voices Heard Project ===
In the wake of the pandemic, #WeNeedToTalk the podcast shifted gears and Malynda now hosts the show solo focusing on personal stories and how they relate to social justice, religion, politics and culture. She has interviewed notable figures such as John Pavlovitz, Shaun King, Kyla Pratt, Author Frederick Joseph, Singer-Songwriter Richard Marx, singer Michelle Williams, Pastor Sarah Jakes Roberts, Musician/Host Grace Semler Baldridge, actress Angel Parker, and Cornel West.

Following the murder of George Floyd, Malynda went on to create and produce The Black Voices Heard Project. Black Voices Heard is a photo and video series set to amplify Black voices across different fields, and life experiences. It will include personal stories, how they personally want to combat racism, breaking down stereotypes of black people, and personal messages that they want to share with the world about being Black in America.

=== 2022–present: God and His Gun and other projects ===
In December 2021 Malynda returned to the stage and played “Tanta Kringle” in the Troubadour Theatre company’s performance of “ Santa Clause is coming to Motown”. In January 2022 Malynda released a music video for her song " God and His Gun", a song that depicted the hypocrisy and harm that the church has caused many marginalized groups. God and His Gun went on to be nominated for two Josie Music Awards for Social Impact Video of the Year and Female Music Video of the year. In Spring of 2022, Malynda became the host for the ABC Mouse sing along show "Sing With Me". In the summer of 2022, she starred in a feature film alongside Loretta Devine and Amy Madigan and a short film with Danielle Beckman and Bobby Moynihan. She also played The Soul Sister Fairy Godmother in Cindy and the Disco Ball, a 70's version of Cinderella at the Garry Marshall Theatre.

In 2023 she became an Assistant producer at the Garry Marshall Theatre and helped develop their youth arts education programs. She headlined a concert at the First United Methodist Church of Los Angeles in honor of MLK and all proceeds went to R.O.C. Era non profit Organization. In Summer of 2023 she was a featured panelist at Wondercon for Women in Film and Media, and starred in the Lifetime Movie Network movie Lust, Lies and Polygamy. Malynda was the Keynote Speaker at East Los Angeles College for their opening day, and a featured soloist with the San Bernardino Orchestra.

== Activism and faith ==
Hale has always been an avid supporter of causes in which she believes. She' is an advocate of the LGBT community and marriage equality. She is actively involved in increasing education about interracial relationships, being in one herself. Hale is also a vegan, and is the spokeswoman for cosmetic company Valana Minerals vegan makeup company. She is a supporter of the Black Lives Matter movement. On July 15, 2016, Hale released a video for a new song called "We Run" in support of the movement. She has also supported the Save a Child's Heart foundation. In the fall of 2016 Hale appeared on NBC's The More You Know segment of Naturally Danny Tseo as an inspiring woman who wants to inspire other women. The segment was sponsored by Alex and Ani. Malynda has twice joined the cast for Concert 4 America: Stand Up, Sing Out! directed by Seth Rudetsky and sang alongside Jane Lynch, Wayne Brady, Melissa Manchester. Concert 4 America is a one night only concert event that supports non-profit organizations as they work to protect the human rights, civil rights, and the environment of all Americans.

Hale was born and raised in the church and stays active in her church community. She identifies herself as a Progressive Christian. While in New York she was an assistant worship leader at Journey Metro Church, and she was a member of the choir and featured soloist at Broadway United Methodist Church during her time in Chicago. In Los Angeles, she was the worship leader at Hollywood United Methodist Church-North Campus in Toluca Lake, now named Harmony Toluca Lake, for four years. Twice a month she led a small group at the church entitled Courageous Conversations that focused on social justice through the eyes of Jesus. In 2024 leading up to the election she created Christians for Kamala with Author and Pastor John Pavlovitz.

Hale has spoken out against antisemitism, and was a featured commentator on CNN discussing the controversy and backlash with Kanye West. In 2023 she interviewed Oscar Grants mom and the Oscar Grant Foundation for TVOne and had an article featured in The Daily Beast entitled "What Would Jesus Do?: Not What the MAGA right is Doing". In 2025, Hale joined a coalition of Jewish and black community leaders, along with Holocaust survivors, at a ceremony marking the 80th anniversary of the liberation of Auschwitz concentration camp, held at Auschwitz concentration camp and hosted by the Auschwitz Jewish Center in Oświęcim. She was joined by political analyst Van Jones, businessman Robert F. Smith and author John Hope Bryant. She is also a Builders Movement Partner with the Builders Movement non profit founded by Dan Lubetsky.

== Personal life ==
Hale met her husband John Volk in December 2009. The two were wed in Santa Monica, California at First A.M.E. church of Santa Monica on December 22, 2011. They currently reside in North Hills, Los Angeles, CA. The couple co-owns JMV Entertainment Production Company. They have two children.

== Discography ==
- From My Heart To Yours (2007)
- No More Tears (2009)
- The Train Ride Home (2012)
- Flashback (2013)
- Pieces of Me (2015)
- We Run (2016)
- Stand (2017)
- The One (2018)
- The La La Song (2019)
- Story (2019)
- Ancestral Sin (2019)
- All Around the World (2019)
- Still Standing (2020)
- God and His Gun (2021)
- Celebrate Christmas (2023)
- Time Will Find a Way (2024)
- A Better World (2024)
- I Need a Holiday (2024)

== Filmography ==
| Year | Title | Role | Notes |
|---|---|---|---|
| 2013 | The 4th Meeting | Diana | |
| 2014 | Open Reservations | Emily | |
| 2014 | Sex Sent me to the ER | Nurse Lisa | Episode "Wax on, Wax off" |
| 2014 | Meet Me at a Funeral | Maya | |
| 2014 | Medley (Official Cannes Selection) | Concertista | |
| 2015 | Appreciation | Reeva | |
| 2015 | Oranges | Angie | |
| 2016 | A Father's Secret | Detective | Lifetime Movie Network |
| 2016 | Agenda X | Jade | |
| 2017 | 202 a New Series | Nya | Producer |
| 2022 | Bull Street | LouEster Gibbs | |
| 2022 | Ex-Husband | Dede | |
| 2023 | Lust, Lies & Polygamy | Cindy | Lifetime Movie Network |
| 2023 | Curtain Call | Lauren | Director/Producer |
| 2024 | Lambs | Lynda | |
| 2025 | The Englightenment of Brittany Darlington | Janelle Jenkins | |
| 2026 | Au Gratin | Dionne | Director/Producer |

== Awards and nominations ==
| Year | Association | Category | Nominated work | Result |
|---|---|---|---|---|
| 2013 | African American Arts Alliance of Chicago | Best Actress in Film Best Picture | The 4th Meeting | Won |
| 2016 | Hollywood Music in Media | Best Adult Contemporary Song Best Female Vocalist | "Falling" "We Run" | Nominated Won |
| 2016 | Independent Music Award | Best Adult Contemporary Album Best Adult Contemporary Song | "Pieces of Me" "Falling" | Nominated Nominated |
| 2016 | Indie Music Channel Radio Music Awards | Best Female Pop Artist | "Waiting For You" | Won |
| 2017 | Indie Music Channel Awards | Best Female Pop Artist Best Pop Song Best Pop Song Best Pop Music Video | "Stand" "Stand" "We Run" "Stand" | Nominated Nominated Nominated Won |
| 2017 | The Josie Music Awards | Pop/Contemporary Artist of the Year Pop Contemporary Song of the Year | – "Stand" | Nominated Won |
| 2018 | 34th Annual Mid-Atlantic Song Contest | Best Adult Contemporary Song | "Stand" | Honorable Mention |
| 2019 | Indie Music Channel Awards | Best Pop Artist | "The One" | Nominated |
| 2019 | Independent Music Award | Best Pop EP | "The One" | Nominated |
| 2022 | The Josie Music Awards | Christian Gospel Inspirational Vocalist Music Video of the Year Social Impact Song of the Year Social Impact Video of the Year | "Still Standing" "God and His Gun" "God and His Gun" "God and His Gun" | Nominated Nominated Nominated Nominated |
