= Amir Abo-Shaeer =

American teacher and mechanical engineer (born 1972)

Amir Muhsin Abo-Shaeer
- Born: March 20, 1972 (age 54); São Paulo, Brazil
- Education: University of California, Santa Barbara (B.S. 1996, M.S. 1998, M.Ed. 2001)
- Spouse: Emily Shaeer
- Children: 1
- Engineering career
- Employer: Santa Barbara School Districts
- Projects: Dos Pueblos Engineering Academy
- Awards: MacArthur Fellowship (2010)

Amir Muhsin Abo-Shaeer (Arabic: أمير محسن أبو شعير; born March 20, 1972) is an American teacher and mechanical engineer. In 2001, during his first year of teaching, he established the Dos Pueblos Engineering Academy (DPEA) on the Dos Pueblos High School campus. In addition to being the Director of the DPEA, he teaches physics, engineering, robotics, machining, and manufacturing. His focused outreach efforts have yielded 50% female student enrollment in the DPEA. He also ran FRC Team 1717 as part of the academy program. He was named a MacArthur Fellow in 2010. He is the first high school teacher to win the award, as well as the first FIRST mentor to win the award for work relating to FIRST robotics.

== Early life and education ==
Shaeer was born to an Iraqi Muslim father and an Irish-American mother in São Paulo, Brazil, where his father was teaching physics at the university. Before his first birthday, his family returned to Santa Barbara, California, where he has resided ever since.

He graduated from Dos Pueblos High School and attended the University of California, Santa Barbara, where he earned a B.S. in physics, a M.S. in mechanical engineering, and a M.Ed. in secondary education.

== Career ==
Shaeer began his career as a mechanical engineer in the private sector. He worked on research and development in academia, aerospace, and telecommunications before deciding to pursue a career in education. Early on, he taught physics, wrote the curriculum, and developed courses for the DPEA. He eventually decided that the capstone course for the senior class would revolve around the FIRST Robotics Competition (FRC), which requires students to design and construct a 120-pound (54 kg) robot to compete against other robots in a game challenge that is different every year. The DPEA is known as Team 1717 in the FIRST community.

In 2007, he garnered a $3 million California state matching grant to create a 12,000-square-foot (1,100 m^{2}) engineering facility on the high school campus to support the implementation of the Career Technical Education (CTE) curriculum he created. The building opened in October 2011 and is currently in use.

On September 29, 2010, Congresswoman Lois Capps congratulated him on the floor of the United States House of Representatives for winning the MacArthur Fellowship.

== Media ==
The New York Times-bestselling author Neal Bascomb wrote a book chronicling Abo-Shaeer's teaching and his 2009 FIRST robotics team's competition season. The New Cool was released on March 1, 2011.

== Personal life ==
Shaeer and his wife, Emily, have a daughter.

== Awards and honors ==
- 2008 Goleta Educator of the Year
- 2008 Certificate of Special Congressional Recognition
- 2009 Santa Barbara Rotary Outstanding Service Award
- 2010 MacArthur Fellowship
- 2011 FIRST Woodie Flowers Award – Los Angeles Regional
- 2013 Distinguished Educator Award from the Paul Allen Family Foundation
- 2013 Distinguished Alumni Award, University of California, Santa Barbara
- 2013 Marvyn Melvin Distinguished Teacher Award, Santa Barbara County Education Office
