= Tyler Fredrickson =

American football player and television personality (born 1981)

No. 16
- Position: Placekicker / Punter

Personal information
- Born: February 26, 1981 (age 45); Santa Barbara, California
- Listed height: 6 ft 2 in (1.88 m)
- Listed weight: 210 lb (95 kg)

Career information
- High school: Goleta (CA) Dos Pueblos
- College: California
- NFL draft: 2004: undrafted

Career history
- Seattle Seahawks (2004)*; Denver Broncos (2005)*; Amsterdam Admirals (2006)*; Denver Broncos (2006)*; Dallas Cowboys (2006)*; Washington Redskins (2007)*; Oakland Raiders (2007)*; Los Angeles Avengers (2008)
- * Offseason or practice squad member only

Career AFL statistics
- FG Made: 4
- FG Att: 7
- PAT Made: 46
- PAT Att: 52
- Stats at ArenaFan.com

Tyler Fredrickson (born February 26, 1981) is an American former football placekicker, and TV personality. He played in the NFL for the Washington Redskins and Oakland Raiders in 3 preseason games during the 2007 season but was cut on September 2 before the start of the regular season. While with Oakland, he connected on a 49-yard field goal versus the Arizona Cardinals and handled all punting and placekicking duties during the team's final preseason game against the Seattle Seahawks (avg. 49 yds on five punts).

He signed a three-year deal (to have kept him in Los Angeles through the 2010 season) with the Los Angeles Avengers of the Arena Football League on April 24, midway through the 2008 season. He played in their final eight games.

In early 2015, he was a contestant on the 30th season of the reality show Survivor. He was eliminated in seventh place.

Formerly a development executive with actress Joey King, he now is a film executive at Wonder Project, creators of House of David (TV series).

== Early life ==
Born to parents Mark Fredrickson and Mimi Lessett, Fredrickson attended Dos Pueblos High School in Goleta, California, where he played both football and soccer. He has a sister named Taryn. As a senior, he was named second team All-CIF Southern Section punter as a senior. As a placekicker, he once booted three field goals, including the game-winner with four seconds left, to beat Cabrillo High School, 9–7. As a soccer player, he was a four-time all-league performer.

== College career ==
At the University of California, Berkeley, Fredrickson was the Golden Bears’ starting punter for three seasons and doubled as the placekicker as a senior in 2003. Fredrickson punted 198 times for Cal, averaging 39.4 yards per boot. While handling the placekicking duties, he converted on attempts from 51 and 53 yards out, registering the third and fifth-longest field goals in Golden Bear history.

== Professional career ==
=== NFL attempts ===
Fredrickson only played pre-season NFL games, never starting in a regular season pro-game.

Fredrickson signed a free agent contract with the Seattle Seahawks following the 2004 NFL draft, but was waived during training camp, after kicking on Monday Night Football versus the Green Bay Packers. A year later, he was in training camp with the Denver Broncos, followed by a stint in NFL Europe with the Amsterdam Admirals. In 2006, Fredrickson re-signed with the Broncos, only to be released once again prior to the start of training camp. Six days later he was picked up by the Dallas Cowboys and kicked a 49-yard field goal during a preseason Monday Night Football game versus the New Orleans Saints before being released. Prior to the start of the 2007 NFL season, he spent time with both the Washington Redskins and the Oakland Raiders. Fredrickson has also had tryouts with the Baltimore Ravens, New York Jets, Tennessee Titans, Pittsburgh Steelers, and Kansas City Chiefs.

=== Los Angeles Avengers ===
Fredrickson signed with the Los Angeles Avengers of the Arena Football League on April 24, 2008, midway through the season. He played in their final eight games.

== Survivor ==
In 2014, Fredrickson competed on Survivor: Worlds Apart, the 30th season of American television show Survivor. It premiered on February 25, 2015. He placed seventh, lasted 32 out of 39 days, was the 12th person voted out, and became the fifth jury member.

Fredrickson began the game on the Masaya (White Collar) tribe and quickly formed an alliance with Joaquin Souberbielle and Carolyn Rivera. Upon the tribal switch, he was assigned to Escameca and would join up with Souberbielle and former Blue Collar tribe member Rodney Lavoie Jr., in a new alliance, but would lose Souberbielle who would be voted out on a blindside.

Post-merge, Fredrickson would be part of a six-member alliance of himself, Rivera, Lavoie, Will Sims II, Dan Foley, and Sierra Thomas. This alliance would eliminate all the former No Collar tribe members (apart from Sims), and set their sights on eliminating the biggest threat in the game: Mike Holloway. However, Holloway saved himself repeatedly with immunity wins, and when he played his Hidden Immunity Idol, Fredrickson found himself betrayed by his closest ally Rivera and voted out of the game with three votes (four votes against Holloway all negated by the Idol). Rivera would justify the betrayal at Final Tribal Council by saying she knew that Fredrickson was one of the biggest jury threats and could win the game. He appeared satisfied with the explanation, but he still chose to vote for Holloway to win.

== Post-football career ==
During his senior year at Cal, Fredrickson directed, edited, and starred in the documentary Countdown to Kickoff 2003, about the 2003 California Golden Bears football team. In 2010, he received his second master's degree after graduating from the Peter Stark Producing Program at the USC School of Cinematic Arts. Prior to Survivor, he worked at Creative Artists Agency (CAA), a prominent entertainment and sports agency headquartered in Los Angeles.
