= Survivor: Worlds Apart =

- Season 30
- Region 1 DVD cover
- Presented by: Jeff Probst
- No. of days: 39
- No. of castaways: 18
- Winner: Mike Holloway
- Runners-up: Carolyn Rivera; Will Sims II
- Location: San Juan del Sur, Nicaragua
- No. of episodes: 15

Release
- Original network: CBS
- Original release: February 25 – May 20, 2015

Additional information
- Filming dates: August 4 – September 11, 2014

Season chronology
- ← Previous; San Juan del Sur — Blood vs. Water Next → Cambodia — Second Chance

Survivor: Worlds Apart — White-Collar vs. Blue-Collar vs. No-Collar (commonly referred to as Survivor: Worlds Apart) is the 30th season of the American CBS competitive reality television series Survivor, which premiered on February 25, 2015, with the season finale on May 20, 2015.

The two-hour season finale and one-hour reunion special aired on May 20, 2015, where Mike Holloway was named the winner over Carolyn Rivera and Will Sims II in a 6–1–1 vote.

== Format ==
Survivor is a reality television show based on the Swedish show Expedition Robinson, created by Mark Burnett and Charlie Parsons. The series follows a number of participants isolated in a remote location, where they must provide food, fire, and shelter. One participant is removed from the series by majority vote every three days, with challenges held to give a reward (ranging from living- and food-related prizes to a car) and immunity from being voted out of the series. The last remaining player receives a prize of $1,000,000.

== Contestants ==
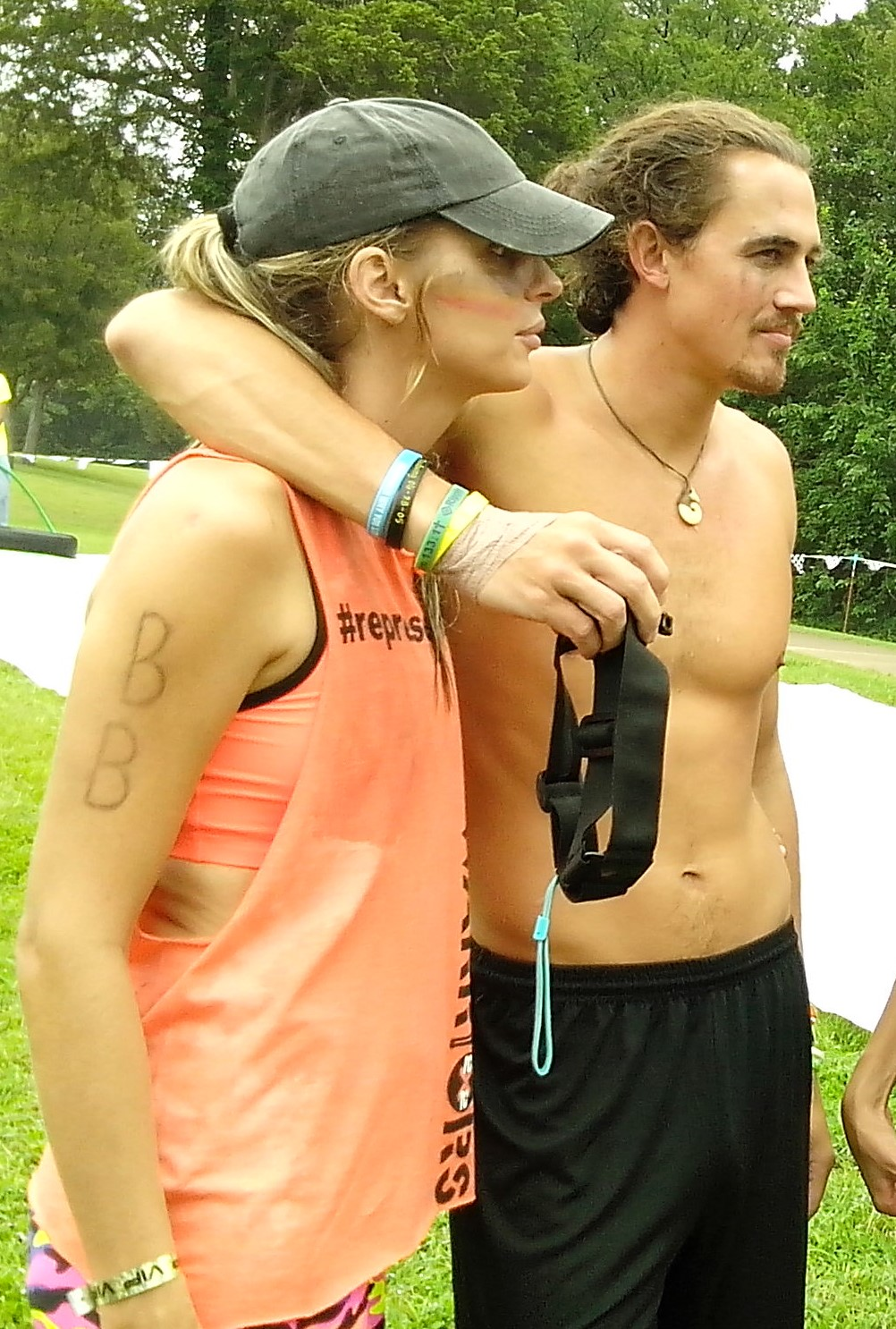
Sierra Dawn Thomas and Joe Anglim

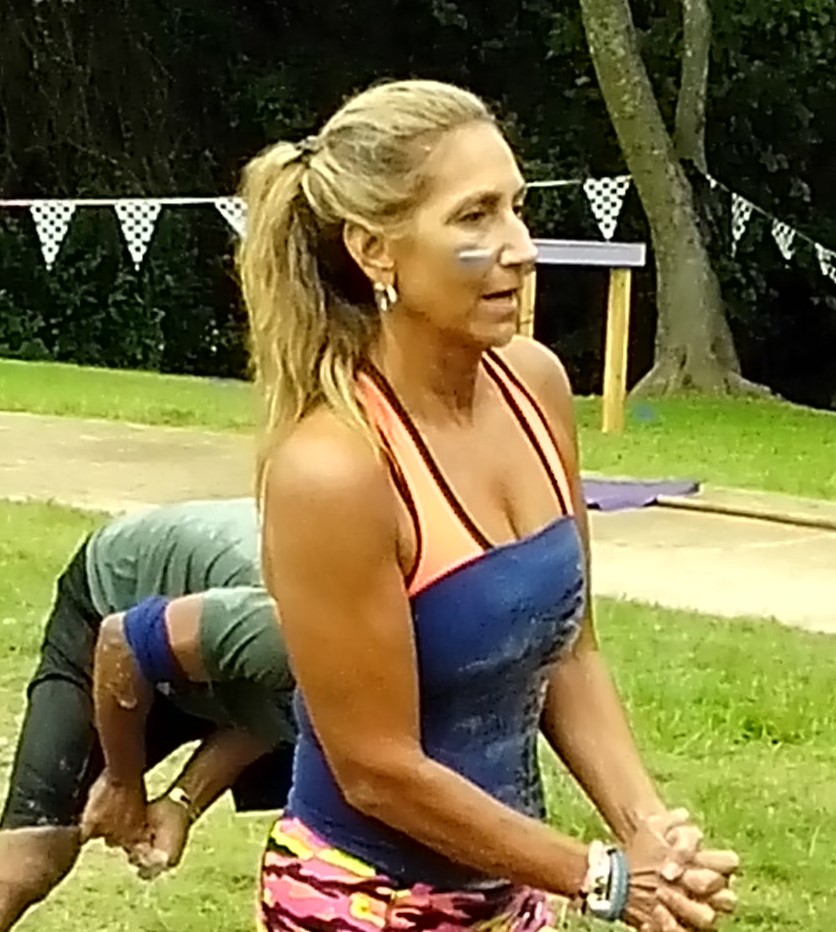
Carolyn Rivera

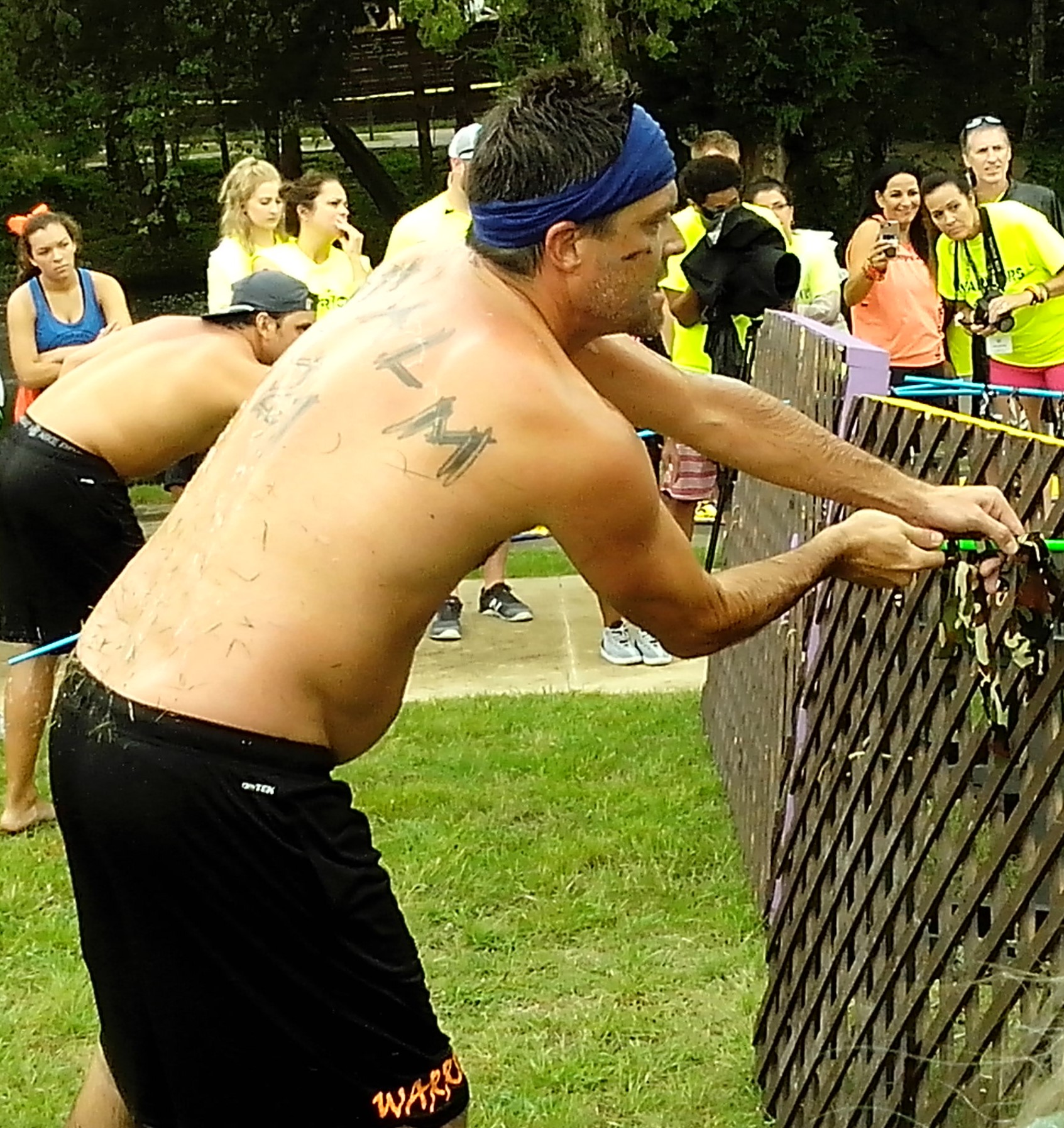
Mike Holloway

The cast is composed of 18 new players, initially split into three tribes containing six members each: Escameca ("Blue Collar"), Masaya ("White Collar"), and Nagarote ("No Collar"). Escameca is named after Playa Escameca, while Masaya and Nagarote both named after the populated places in Nicaragua. The cast includes former football placekicker Tyler Fredrickson. Additionally, So Kim was originally cast on Survivor: San Juan del Sur with her sister Doo, but they dropped out after Doo had a medical emergency the day before the game began.

List of Survivor: Worlds Apart contestants
Contestant	Age	From	Tribe			Finish	
Contestant	Age	From	Original	Switched	Merged	Placement	Day
So Kim	31	Long Beach, California	Masaya			1st voted out	Day 3
Vince Sly	32	Santa Monica, California	Nagarote			2nd voted out	Day 6
Nina Poersch	51	Palmdale, California	Nagarote			3rd voted out	Day 8
Lindsey Cascaddan	24	College Park, Florida	Escameca			4th voted out	Day 11
Max Dawson	37	Topanga, California	Masaya	Nagarote		5th voted out	Day 14
Joaquin Souberbielle	28	Valley Stream, New York	Masaya	Escameca		6th voted out	Day 16
Kelly Remington	44	Grand Island, New York	Escameca	Nagarote	Merica	7th voted out	Day 19
Hali Ford	25	San Francisco, California	Nagarote	Nagarote	Merica	8th voted out 1st jury member	Day 22
Joe Anglim	25	Scottsdale, Arizona	Nagarote	Escameca	Merica	9th voted out 2nd jury member	Day 24
Jenn Brown	22	Long Beach, California	Nagarote	Nagarote	Merica	10th voted out 3rd jury member	Day 27
Shirin Oskooi	31	San Francisco, California	Masaya	Nagarote	Merica	11th voted out 4th jury member	Day 29
Tyler Fredrickson	33	Los Angeles, California	Masaya	Escameca	Merica	12th voted out 5th jury member	Day 32
Dan Foley	47	Gorham, Maine	Escameca	Escameca	Merica	13th voted out 6th jury member	Day 35
Sierra Dawn Thomas	27	Roy, Utah	Escameca	Escameca	Merica	14th voted out 7th jury member	Day 37
Rodney Lavoie Jr.	25	Boston, Massachusetts	Escameca	Escameca	Merica	Eliminated; 8th jury member	Day 38
Will Sims II	41	Sherman Oaks, California	Nagarote	Nagarote	Merica	Co-runners-up	Day 39
Carolyn Rivera	52	Tampa, Florida	Masaya	Nagarote	Merica	Co-runners-up	Day 39
Mike Holloway	38	North Richland Hills, Texas	Escameca	Escameca	Merica	Sole Survivor	Day 39

=== Future appearances ===
Mike Holloway, Carolyn Rivera, Shirin Oskooi, Joe Anglim, and Max Dawson were included on the public poll to choose the cast of the subsequent season, Survivor: Cambodia. Due to Holloway winning Worlds Apart, he was ineligible from participating in Cambodia despite placing in the top 10 of his ballot; Anglim and Oskooi were ultimately chosen to compete. Hali Ford and Sierra Dawn Thomas returned for Survivor: Game Changers. Anglim returned again in Survivor: Edge of Extinction.

Outside of Survivor, Anglim competed on the premiere of Candy Crush. Thomas competed with two-time Survivor contestant Abi-Maria Gomes on a Survivor vs Big Brother episode of Fear Factor.

== Season summary ==
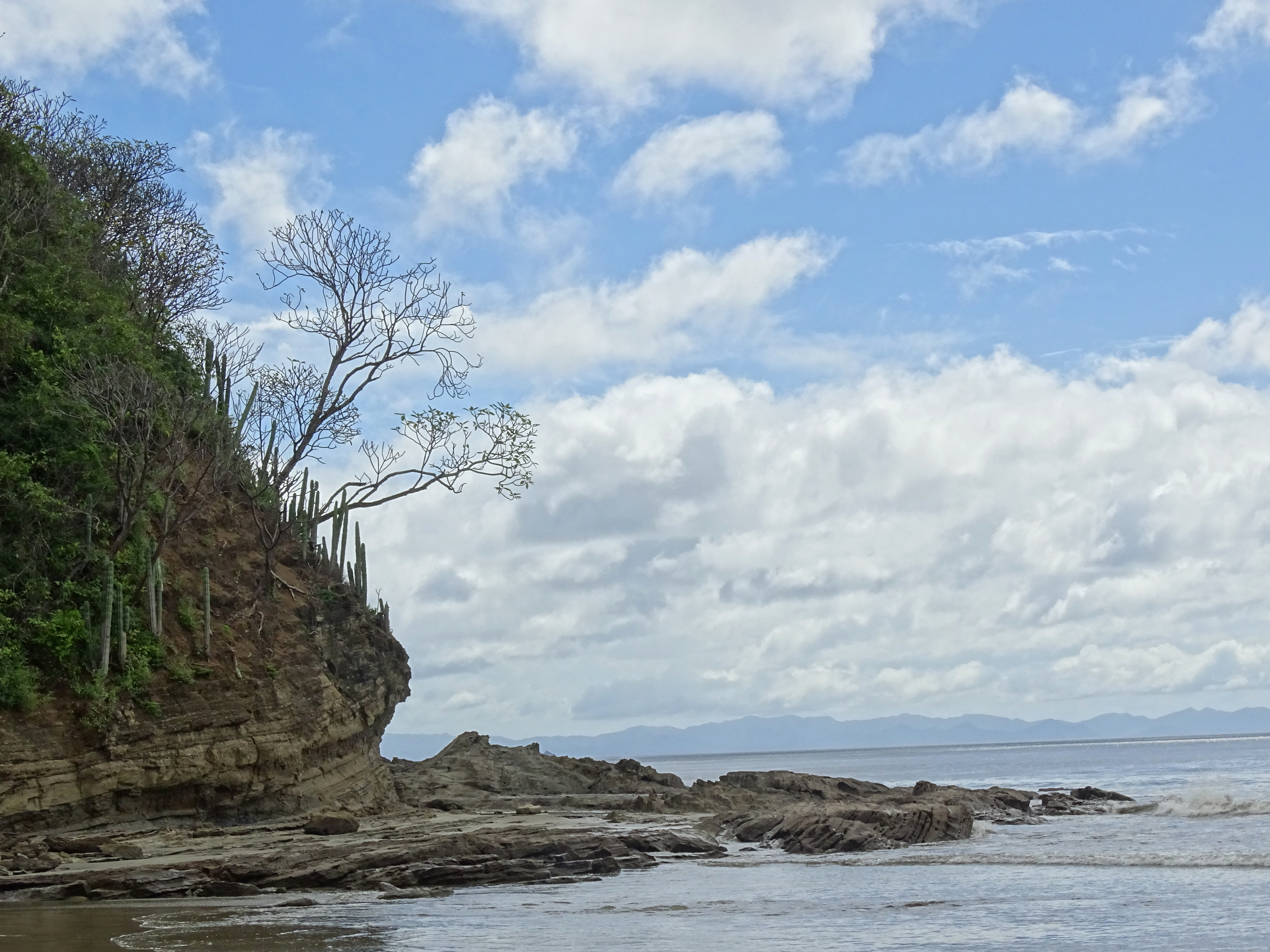
The season filmed in San Juan del Sur in Nicaragua.

The eighteen new castaways were divided into three tribes of six based on social class: Escameca (Blue Collar), Masaya (White Collar), and Nagarote (No Collar). Despite frequent arguments between the Blue Collars, they only went to Tribal Council once, as did the White Collars. Though the No Collars lost two members, a core alliance of Hali, Jenn, and Joe formed, with Will as their fourth. With 14 players remaining, the players were redistributed into two tribes of seven; on Escameca, Blue Collar Rodney and White Collar Joaquin aligned, but Rodney's former Blue Collar allies, led by Mike, blindsided Joaquin to break up the pair and retain Rodney's loyalty.

When the tribes merged, two alliances vied for dominance: the No Collar core alliance, now with White Collar Shirin, went against the Blue Collars. Though Rodney remained with the Blue Collars, he constructed his own alliance with the swing votes—Will, and White Collars Tyler and Carolyn—to eventually take down the other Blue Collars to avenge Joaquin; the augmented Blue Collar alliance systematically eliminated the others, unaware of Rodney's alliance. Mike overheard Rodney’s inner alliance plotting his blindside and outed their plans, but instead found himself ousted from the others and made the primary target. However, Mike won five of the last six immunity challenges and played a hidden immunity idol on the only time he was vulnerable, bringing himself to the end of the game alongside Will and Carolyn. Ultimately, for making it to the end despite being a massive target, Mike was awarded with six of the eight jury votes, and the title of Sole Survivor.

Challenge winners and eliminations by episode
Episode			Challenge winner(s)		Eliminated	
No.	Title	Original air date	Reward	Immunity	Tribe	Player
1	"It's Survivor Warfare"	February 25, 2015	Nagarote		Masaya	So
1	"It's Survivor Warfare"	February 25, 2015	Escameca		Masaya	So
2	"It Will Be My Revenge"	March 4, 2015	Masaya		Nagarote	Vince
2	"It Will Be My Revenge"	March 4, 2015	Escameca		Nagarote	Vince
3	"Crazy is as Crazy Does"	March 11, 2015	Escameca		Nagarote	Nina
3	"Crazy is as Crazy Does"	March 11, 2015	Masaya		Nagarote	Nina
4	"Winner Winner, Chicken Dinner"	March 18, 2015	Nagarote	Nagarote	Escameca	Lindsey
4	"Winner Winner, Chicken Dinner"	March 18, 2015	Masaya	Masaya	Escameca	Lindsey
5	"We're Finally Playing Some Survivor"	March 18, 2015	Escameca	Escameca	Nagarote	Max
6	"Odd Woman Out"	March 25, 2015	Nagarote	Nagarote	Escameca	Joaquin
7	"The Line Will Be Drawn Tonight"	April 1, 2015	None (Note: There was no reward challenge due to the merge.)	Joe	Merica	Kelly
8	"Keep It Real"	April 8, 2015	Joe [Carolyn, Shirin, Tyler, Will]	Joe	Merica	Hali
9	"Livin' On the Edge"	April 15, 2015	Dan, Mike, Shirin, Sierra, Tyler	Tyler	Merica	Joe
10	"Bring the Popcorn"	April 22, 2015	Survivor Auction	Mike	Merica	Jenn
11	"Survivor Russian Roulette"	April 29, 2015	Carolyn, Dan, Tyler, Will	Carolyn	Merica	Shirin
11	"Survivor Russian Roulette"	April 29, 2015	Carolyn, Dan, Tyler, Will	Mike	Merica	Shirin
12	"Holding on for Dear Life"	May 6, 2015	Carolyn, Mike, Sierra	Carolyn	Merica	Tyler
13	"My Word Is My Bond"	May 13, 2015	Carolyn, Mike, Will	Mike	Merica	Dan
14	"It's A Fickle, Fickle Game"	May 20, 2015	Mike	Mike	Merica	Sierra
14	"It's A Fickle, Fickle Game"	May 20, 2015	None	Mike	Merica	Rodney
15	"Reunion"	May 20, 2015				

== Episodes ==
No. overall	No. in season	Title	CBS recap	Rating/share (18-49)	Original release date	U.S. viewers (millions)	Weekly rank
441	1	"It's Survivor Warfare"	Recap	2.4/7	February 25, 2015	10.04	12
As the game began, Jeff Probst asked each tribe to pick a representative, who would then choose another tribe-mate with whom to make a big decision; Joaquin and So stepped up for the White Collar tribe, Dan and Mike for the Blue Collar tribe, and Will and Jenn for the No Collar tribe. At camp, the pairs were given a choice between a big bag of beans or a smaller bag of beans and a clue to the hidden immunity idol. Only Joaquin and So decided to take the clue, subsequently lying to their tribe about their decision, raising suspicion. Dan and Mike told their Blue Collar tribe the truth about their decision, though Sierra was skeptical. At the No Collar camp, Vince bonded with Jenn over their mutual outlook on life but bickered with Joe over how to build the shelter. The following day, the Blue Collar tribe also argued about the shelter, with Dan complaining over his tribemates' choices; Rodney and the women agreed that Dan would be an easy target to eliminate first, but Dan found an ally in Mike. At the No Collar camp, Joe earned his tribe mates' admiration, particularly Jenn's, by making fire without flint. Vince took Jenn aside to make sure that she was still loyal to him, causing Jenn to doubt whether Vince was a viable alliance partner. At the White Collar camp, Carolyn suspected So was looking for the hidden immunity idol, but successfully found it herself, citing knowledge of past seasons' hiding spots as her guide. Reward/immunity challenge: The tribes raced down a platform through a pile of hay and high stepped through an obstacle. Each tribe had to unlock a ladder; to release it, they chose to either untie a series of knots or unlock three locks with a ring of 20 keys. The tribes then used the ladder to navigate a platform and then retrieve one of three puzzles: an easy 50-piece jigsaw puzzle, a medium-difficulty 10-piece tree puzzle, or a very difficult five-piece tangram puzzle. The first tribe to complete their puzzle won immunity and a fire-making kit, while the second-place tribe received immunity and flint. White Collar and No Collar were neck-and-neck until Shirin from the White Collar tribe struggled on the 50-piece puzzle; the other two tribes found success with the 10-piece puzzle and won immunity. While Shirin seemed to be an easy target for the White Collar tribe's first vote, So decided to target Carolyn for not stepping up to either the ladder releasing or puzzle solving tasks during the challenge; to save herself, Carolyn told Tyler about her idol. So and Joaquin believed that they were in an alliance with Max and Tyler, but Max's true loyalty was with Shirin and Carolyn, who attempted to get Tyler to join them in voting off So. At Tribal Council, Shirin called Joaquin and So out for their lie regarding the clue to the hidden immunity idol, while So admitted that Carolyn was her target, which prompted a heated debate between the two. Tyler ultimately decided to join Carolyn, Max, and Shirin, as So became the first player voted out.
442	2	"It Will Be My Revenge"	Recap	2.3/7	March 4, 2015	9.77	13
At the Blue Collar camp, Dan lost his underwear in the water after getting hit by a wave; his attempts to make light of the situation led Lindsey to further believe he was creating a character out of himself. On the White Collar tribe, Max and Shirin took off their underwear around camp, making Tyler uncomfortable. On the No Collar tribe, Hali and Jenn's attempts to get to know Nina were complicated by Nina's deafness, and tensions increased when Hali and Jenn decided to go skinny dipping without asking her, leading to a public outburst from Nina out of frustration. While the Blue Collar tribe played makeshift basketball around camp, Mike insisted that the tribe continue to work, annoying Rodney in the process. At the No Collar camp, Vince voiced his frustrations about Joe to Nina, and Vince's attempt to talk to Joe about his behavior around camp only served to further their enmity. With an alliance formed between younger tribe members Hali, Jenn, and Joe, Vince, Nina, and Will considered sticking together. Reward/immunity challenge: One tribe member at a time manoeuvred a buoy through a series of obstacles in the water. Once all five competing tribe members had retrieved their buoys, one member attempted to toss them into a cylinder basket. The first tribe that shot all five buoys into the basket won immunity and a large fishing kit, while the second tribe won immunity and a smaller fishing kit. After No Collar's Will struggled in the water, the other two tribes pulled ahead to win immunity. Back at camp, Vince told Nina that he was worried about Will's health due to his weight and asthma, but was considering blindsiding Joe, as voting Will would keep the tribe strong but put the younger alliance in power. The younger alliance tried to recruit Will to split the vote against Nina and Vince—out of fear for a hidden immunity idol—to ultimately eliminate Nina on the re-vote; Will was hesitant to vote against Nina, his closest ally. Will told Nina and Vince about the vote-splitting, and they decided to target Jenn due to her perceived untrustworthiness and Joe's challenge prowess. However, Nina later told Will that Vince was concerned for Will's health, and had considered voting him out. At Tribal Council, Will decided to stick with the young alliance while going against their vote-splitting plan, voting for Vince and sending him out of the game rather than the alliance's planned target, Nina.
443	3	"Crazy is as Crazy Does"	Recap	2.2/8	March 11, 2015	9.25	20
After Will's rogue vote sent Vince home, Joe questioned Will's loyalty while a teary Nina told the tribe that she knew she was next to go. Joe tried to make Nina feel comfortable, but she admitted that she was not as free-spirited as the rest of her tribe. At the White Collar camp, Shirin annoyed her tribe-mates with her tales of seeing howler monkeys having sex in the trees. The next day, the White Collar tribe sans Carolyn looked for the hidden immunity idol, but were unsuccessful as Carolyn had already found it. Shirin proposed a truce, but Joaquin didn't trust her and continued searching with Tyler; though Tyler knew that Carolyn had the idol and Joaquin was on the outs, he continued searching anyway to keep Joaquin's trust as he considered betraying Shirin for her behavior. At the Blue Collar camp, Dan's attempts to be funny upset Rodney after Dan jokingly insulted his mother. Later, Mike voiced his frustrations with his tribe-mates' work ethic, provoking arguments between him and Rodney, Sierra, and Lindsey, the last of whom insulted Mike's religious views. Reward/immunity challenge: Each tribe carried a large bucket with holes to a water tower, filled the bucket, and raced back to a barrel to dump out the water. The first tribe to fill up their barrel won immunity and lounge chairs, blankets, pillows, and a tarp. The second tribe won immunity and a tarp. The No Collar tribe fell behind quickly, which prompted Joe to send Nina back from the water tower to the barrel; the strategy proved ineffective, and they lost their second consecutive challenge. Back at camp, Joe apologized to Nina for implementing the faulty strategy and assuming she would slow the tribe down. Will and Nina both campaigned to vote the other out. Though the original plan was to eliminate Nina, Hali and Jenn considered voting Will out instead after he had proven himself unpredictable by voting Vince out. At Tribal Council, Nina claimed that her tribe perceived that she was weak because of her deafness, though the tribe argued that wasn't the case. When Will discussed his poor challenge performance, Nina took the opportunity to openly campaign against him. She then discussed her previous white collar background and how she felt she had been placed on the wrong tribe. After a pep talk from Hali, Nina affirmed that she would try and fit in with her tribe mates, although she would never get the chance as she was voted out after receiving votes from Jenn, Will, and Joe.
444	4	"Winner Winner, Chicken Dinner"	Recap	2.3/7	March 18, 2015	9.62	9
After voting out Nina, the No Collar tribe affirmed their loyalty to each other, though Will felt he would be the next to go if they lost again. At the Blue Collar camp, Rodney noted his respect for Mike despite their previous disagreements. Reward challenge: One member of each tribe acted as a caller while two other blindfolded tribe members navigated the course to retrieve five items, including a flag, eventually working with a third blindfolded tribe-mate to hoist the items up to the caller's platform. The winning tribe received three egg-laying hens and a rooster, while the second-place tribe received ten eggs. During the challenge, the Blue Collar tribe's platform dropped on Kelly's forehead; after a brief medical examination she was cleared to continue in the challenge. The No Collar tribe finished in first place while the White Collar tribe took second. The victorious No Collar tribe celebrated Will's birthday by eating one of their chickens from the reward. Jenn, a vegetarian, felt uncomfortable with the killing and roasting; she went searching for the hidden immunity idol, which she found, while the tribe feasted. At the Blue Collar camp, Kelly received six stitches from her injury at the challenge, but her bravery throughout the ordeal earned Mike's respect, and the two affirmed their alliance. Rodney's remarks that women should hold themselves to a higher standard than men caused a heated argument between him and Lindsey. At the White Collar camp, Shirin continued to alienate her tribe-mates with her behavior, which caused Carolyn to consider betraying Shirin and her closest ally, Max. Immunity challenge: Each tribe-mate was tethered to a rope; one at a time, they navigated through a series of obstacles; once all four tribe-mates completed the course, they grabbed a bag of balls, and used them to navigate a vertical maze. The first two tribes to get all three balls to the top of the maze won immunity. All three tribes were neck-and-neck throughout the challenge, but the No Collar and White Collar tribes narrowly won, sending Blue Collar to their first Tribal Council. Lindsey and Sierra campaigned against Rodney for his misogynistic behavior, while Rodney retaliated by targeting Lindsey. At Tribal Council, Dan, Mike, and Kelly decided to align with Rodney, splitting their votes between Lindsey and Sierra in case of a hidden immunity idol; the vote was initially tied, with two votes each on Lindsey, Rodney, and Sierra, but Lindsey was eliminated after a unanimous revote.
445	5	"We're Finally Playing Some Survivor"	Recap	2.3/7	March 18, 2015	9.62	9
After receiving two votes and losing her closest ally, an upset Sierra felt isolated from her tribe; Dan's attempts at justifying voting for her only upset her further. At the reward challenge, the three tribes were redistributed into two tribes of seven: Blue Collar tribe members Dan, Mike, Rodney, and Sierra were joined by Joaquin and Tyler from White Collar, and Joe from No Collar to form the new Escameca tribe, while No Collar tribe members Hali, Jenn, and Will were joined by Carolyn, Max, and Shirin from White Collar, and Kelly from Blue Collar to become the new Nagarote tribe. Reward challenge: Two tribe-mates from each tribe alternated launching balls from a slingshot while the remaining five tribe-mates had to catch the balls with handheld nets; catching a ball would score one point for their tribe. The first tribe to reach five points won a box of kitchen supplies, including pots, pans, oils spices, and sausages, and all of the rewards from the now-abandoned White Collar camp. The new Escameca tribe quickly won the challenge, five points to Nagarote's two. At the Nagarote camp, the former No Collar and White Collar tribe-mates, three people apiece, vied for Kelly's vote; the No Collar alliance took a more laid-back approach, while former White Collar Shirin acted quickly. Later, Shirin's behavior got on her new tribe-mates' nerves. Max was stung on both feet by a stingray; after putting his wart-covered feet in the tribe's cooking pot on Jenn's advice, he was perceived as selfish. At Escameca, Dan, Mike, and Rodney realized that Sierra had all the reason to abandon them for their new tribe-mates, and attempted to bring her back into their fold. Sierra indeed vocalized her desire to align with Joaquin, Joe, and Tyler, though Joaquin and Rodney began to bond. Later, Dan attempted to apologize to Sierra for his previous behavior, but again only further alienated her after ignoring Mike's advice on how to approach her. Immunity challenge: Two members from each tribe placed pots on a sled and dragged it through a series of obstacles, placing the pots on stands at the end of the course. Once all eight pots were in place, one tribe-mate used a wrecking ball to smash the pots. The first tribe to smash all eight pots won immunity. Tyler and Joaquin quickly gave Escameca an early lead, which they maintained to handily win the challenge. Back at camp, Shirin and Max targeted Will for his weakness in challenges, telling Carolyn and Kelly their plans. Though Kelly agreed, Carolyn decided to betray her former White Collar tribe-mates, joining the No Collar alliance instead. Kelly, realizing that Carolyn was no longer with Shirin and Max, also abandoned them. At Tribal Council, the new alliance of five put their votes on Max, sending him out of the game.
446	6	"Odd Woman Out"	Recap	2.3/8	March 25, 2015	9.64	10
The morning after Max's blindside, Shirin, his closest ally, attempted to figure out why Carolyn betrayed them; Carolyn claimed that it was because the two excluded her from strategic conversations. After Hali admitted that it was because the two were annoying, Shirin vowed to reintegrate with her tribe. At Escameca, Rodney and Joaquin aligned based on their common lifestyles. Reward challenge: The tribes raced up a tower and through a series of obstacles. At the top, one tribe-mate at a time launched sandbags from a catapult toward targets on the field below. The first tribe to hit all six of their targets won an overnight trip to a turtle sanctuary and enjoyed a feast. Though Escameca was first to the top of their tower, Nagarote came from behind to narrowly win the challenge. On the reward, Shirin bonded with her tribe-mates. The next day, at Escameca, Joaquin tried to align with Sierra; though Sierra was prepared to align with Joaquin and Tyler, she was perturbed by Joaquin's friendship with Rodney. Rodney later plotted with Mike to throw the immunity challenge to get rid of Joe for being a physical and social threat at the merge, which Mike considered in order to protect his closest ally, Kelly, on the other tribe. Immunity challenge: One castaway from each tribe faced off to memorize a series of six items at a station. Once a castaway thought they had the series memorized, they pulled a handle, concealing the items. The two castaways then ran to a second station to recreate the sequence. The first castaway to correctly recreate the sequence scored a point for their tribe. If neither castaway got the series correct, the castaways repeated the process until one of them succeeded. The first tribe to score three points won immunity. After the tribes were tied with two points apiece, Mike blatantly threw the final match to Kelly to give Nagarote the win. Back at camp, Rodney continued to target Joe; though Joaquin and Tyler agreed to the plan, Mike and Dan decided to betray him and align with Joe instead to break up Rodney and Joaquin's partnership. Sierra found herself as the swing vote, but ultimately decided to side with Dan, Joe, and Mike to eliminate Joaquin.
447	7	"The Line Will Be Drawn Tonight"	Recap	2.2/8	April 1, 2015	9.59	7
Left out of the plans to vote out Joaquin, Rodney felt betrayed by his Blue Collar allies. Mike informed Rodney that they eliminated Joaquin to protect Rodney from being duped, though Rodney claimed that he was trying to reel Joaquin in, not vice versa, and berated Mike for not trusting him. The next morning, the two tribes were merged, and enjoyed a commemorative feast. At the feast, Shirin asked about Joaquin's blindside and was informed that he and Rodney had grown too close. Realizing that pairs were being targeted, Carolyn planned to downplay her partnership with Tyler going forward. At the merged camp, Mike and Kelly celebrated their reunion as Kelly realigned with her former Blue Collar tribe-mates. Joe rejoined former No Collar allies Hali and Jenn, and the three brought Shirin into their fold. With Kelly noticeably realigning with her former tribe, the alliance of four attempted to align with Tyler and Carolyn instead. Will, the fourth former No Collar, was courted by Rodney, who proposed a final four deal with him, Kelly, and Carolyn. Rodney conspired for the four to initially vote with the Blue Collars but later betray Dan, Mike, and Sierra to avenge Joaquin. Amidst all the scrambling, Tyler and Carolyn found themselves the swing votes between the Blue Collar and No Collar alliances; Rodney and Mike plotted to target Joe first, though a vexed Rodney told Mike that they wouldn't be in this mess had Mike not spared Joe at the previous Tribal Council. Immunity challenge: Each castaway held onto a 13-feet tall pole as long as possible without falling off. The last castaway remaining on their pole won immunity. After an hour, Joe outlasted Jenn and Carolyn to win the first individual immunity of the game, foiling the Blue Collars' plan. The Blue Collar alliance shifted their target to Jenn instead to split up her and Hali, though they told Will that Hali was the target to see if he was trustworthy; the alliance of Joe, Hali, Jenn and Shirin targeted Kelly. Tyler and Carolyn entertained offers from both alliances, while a nervous Jenn revealed her idol to Hali, considering playing it. At Tribal Council, Will, Carolyn, and Tyler all voted with the Blue Collar alliance—Will for Hali and the rest for Jenn—but Jenn played her hidden immunity idol, negating the seven votes against her and eliminating Kelly instead.
448	8	"Keep It Real"	Recap	2.5/8	April 8, 2015	9.84	12
After Jenn's successful idol play sent Kelly out of the game, Rodney blamed Mike for changing the target from Hali to Jenn, and tried to convince Will, Tyler, and Carolyn to turn on Mike once the minority alliance—Hali, Jenn, Joe, and Shirin—was out of the game. Rodney later blatantly disrespected the minority alliance, and bickered with Shirin over food portioning. Reward challenge: The castaways went across a balance beam to transport three bags of puzzle pieces to a platform. The first three castaways to transport all three of their bags advanced to the next round, where they used the pieces to complete a puzzle shaped like an anchor. The first castaway that completed their puzzle won an afternoon of ziplining followed by a pizza lunch. Joe, Mike, and Hali advanced to the final round, where Joe won his second individual challenge in a row. Given the choice to take four other castaways with him on the reward, Joe chose to take Carolyn, Tyler, Will, and Shirin to earn their trust and bolster his minority alliance. Joe found a clue to a hidden immunity idol in a bottle Carolyn was drinking from; he managed to trick her into giving him the bottle and took the clue, but Tyler spotted him. The next morning, Joe shared the clue with Tyler, but Mike saw them sneak off and spied on them; Tyler told Mike about the clue to keep the Blue Collars' trust. Though Joe couldn't find the idol, Mike decided to frame him by claiming that he saw Joe find it, which sidelined Joe from continuing his search; Mike continued looking, and eventually found the idol. Immunity challenge: The castaways navigated a puzzle piece through three slide mazes, and then used that piece to complete a sliding puzzle. The first castaway to complete the slide puzzle won immunity. Though Dan twice believed that he had completed the sliding puzzle, he was wrong both times; Joe won the challenge, continuing his winning streak. Shirin and Sierra told Hali and Jenn about Dan's condescending comments, and Sierra considered leaving her Blue Collar alliance for a girls alliance; Shirin lobbied Tyler to take Dan out and weaken the dominating Blue Collars as she thought it was their only opportunity to do so. At Tribal Council, Dan stated that "flippers never win," but Shirin claimed that his comment was just a fear tactic to discourage voting against him. However, neither Tyler nor Sierra flipped, and the Blue Collar alliance—Will, Tyler, and Carolyn included—targeted Hali, and she became the first member of the jury.
449	9	"Livin' On the Edge"	Recap	2.2/8	April 15, 2015	9.35	12
After losing her closest ally in Hali, a despondent Jenn was ready to get voted out. Shirin then told the others that she would vote for Mike to win the game, in the hopes that it would turn him into a target. Later, she lobbied with Mike and Sierra to vote out Carolyn, who was perceived to have Rodney, Tyler, and Will on her side. Reward challenge: Divided into two teams of five, one castaway at a time raced through a series of obstacles in the water. After all five teammates were at the end platform, one teammate at a time used a grappling hook to retrieve rings in the water. The first team to retrieve all five of their rings won an afternoon away from camp to enjoy a buffet of chocolate. The teams were neck-and-neck at the grappling portion, but the team of Dan, Mike, Shirin, Sierra, and Tyler pulled ahead to win reward. Back at camp, the losing team ate one of the chickens, which again alienated vegetarian Jenn, although the mood was lifted by Rodney's impressions of Mike and Dan; Joe sensed, via his impressions, that Rodney wasn't fully onboard with his alliance, and considered plotting with him to overthrow Mike. Jenn told Joe that she would give him immunity if she won the challenge since she was ready to leave. Immunity challenge: Castaways stood on a wooden frame, balancing a block between their head and the top of the frame without the assistance of their hands. The last contestant with their block remaining won immunity. Tyler outlasted Jenn and Mike to win immunity. Shirin, predicting the majority alliance of seven would split their votes against Joe and Jenn, created a plan wherein she and Joe would vote for Jenn, which would send a willing Jenn out of the game instead of Joe, the majority alliance's intended target. Mike told Shirin to vote against Joe; Shirin was conflicted between voting against Jenn and ruining the majority alliance's plans, or voting against Joe to take out the proven challenge threat and earn the majority alliance's trust. Joe created a fake immunity idol with stashed materials; Mike found him and claimed that he would switch his vote to Jenn if Joe gave him his idol. Joe gave Mike his idol, but Mike stuck with his alliance at Tribal Council, playing the fake idol on Will and voting against Joe; Shirin also voted against Joe, and he became the second member of the jury.
450	10	"Bring the Popcorn"	Recap	2.4/8	April 22, 2015	10.19	10
Rodney told his alliance of Carolyn, Tyler, and Will that it was time to target Mike; unbeknownst to them, Mike overheard the conversation. Survivor Auction: Will bought a covered item which turned out to be a buyout from the auction, and was sent back to camp immediately. Shirin bought chicken and waffles, Jenn bought a large bowl of rum punch, Sierra bought beef souvlaki, and Rodney bought a steak. Sierra bought a letter from home for $20; everyone else was given the chance to buy their letters for the same price. Carolyn, Dan, and Mike were holding out for a possible advantage in the game, but decided they would all buy their letters from home together; Mike sneakily reneged on the deal, but relented after he was called out. Carolyn, Dan, and Mike spent $480 on the potential advantage, and drew rocks, with the white colored rock determining who would get the advantage, ultimately being Dan. Dan's advantage was that he had earned an extra vote at any Tribal Council of his choice up until the final five. Upon returning at camp, Will found a clue that led him to a hidden box filled with rations, including electrolytes, and chose to share them with the rest of the tribe. Mike, having angered others by initially backing out on buying his letter from home to win the advantage, told his close allies that he had only done so because he had overheard Rodney planning his betrayal, which led to an argument between him and Rodney, and upsetting his allies Dan and Sierra; Mike later joined the minority alliance of Jenn and Shirin. Jenn, Mike, and Shirin suspected that Will hadn't given the tribe his full supply of rations, and suggested he was stashing food. Tyler informed Will, who subsequently lashed out at Shirin, verbally attacking her on a personal level. Immunity challenge: Each castaway used metal tongs to transport a ball across a series of teeter-totters to a stand. The first castaway to get all six of their balls to their stand won immunity. Before the challenge began, Will asked Jeff if he could get his letter from home in exchange for sitting out of the challenge. Jeff agreed provided every other castaway approved; all did except for Shirin. Mike won the challenge, thwarting Rodney's plan. Suspecting that Sierra would remain loyal to Rodney's alliance, Jenn, Mike, and Shirin lobbied Dan to join them and vote out Carolyn, while Rodney's alliance—Sierra included—decided to split the vote between Jenn and Shirin. Dan found himself the swing vote, though the majority alliance questioned his loyalty, while Carolyn considered playing her idol due to Dan's hesitance. At Tribal Council, Shirin and Will reignited their argument, during which Shirin tearfully recounted her past as a victim of domestic abuse. Carolyn held on to her idol as the votes were split between Shirin and Jenn, with Mike and Shirin also voting for Jenn to send her out of the game.
451	11	"Survivor Russian Roulette"	Recap	2.2/8	April 29, 2015	9.25	11
Dan and Sierra discussed Mike's claims that they were at the bottom of the majority alliance; Dan later attempted to comfort Shirin about Will's comments at the previous Tribal Council. Reward challenge: Divided into two groups of four, the teams were given four barrels, two wood planks, and rope to cross the beach without any part of their bodies or the planks touching the ground, or else they had to restart. The first team across won a trip on a catamaran, complete with a feast of hamburgers and pie. After the team of Mike, Sierra, Shirin and Rodney accidentally placed a plank on the ground, they decided to each roll on a barrel to make up time, but they were unable to do so and Carolyn, Dan, Tyler, and Will won the challenge. Back at camp, Sierra campaigned to Rodney to get rid of Tyler for being a threat and to take Shirin to the end because no one would vote for her to win, though Rodney did not believe that Tyler was a threat nor did he trust Shirin. On the reward trip, Carolyn, Tyler, and Will did their best to make sure Dan stayed loyal to them. Immunity challenge: Each castaway held onto a rope handle attached to 25% of their body weight as of the beginning of the game. If the rope unspooled and the weight dropped, a bucket of water dropped on the castaway's head and they were eliminated; the last man and woman remaining won immunity. Carolyn and Mike outlasted Shirin and Rodney to win immunity, again thwarting the majority alliance's plans. Though the majority alliance targeted Shirin, she lobbied Dan and Sierra to take out Tyler. Tyler searched through Dan's bag and discovered his extra vote advantage, and later informed Carolyn. Mike attempted to realign with Dan, his former closest ally, but was unsuccessful, and Mike considered playing his idol on Shirin. At Tribal Council, Shirin told everyone that getting rid of her would be a bad idea and that they should get rid of Tyler. Right before the vote, Mike unveiled his hidden immunity idol and claimed that he would give it to Shirin, and that she was going to vote for Tyler and he was going to vote for another member of the dominant alliance, and told the other members of the alliance to vote for Tyler to ensure their safety. Ultimately, Mike did not play the idol for Shirin, but the dominant alliance called his bluff and Shirin was voted out, though Tyler and Will voted against Dan.
452	12	"Holding on for Dear Life"	Recap	2.1/8	May 6, 2015	9.22	9
The dominant alliance—everyone except for Mike—regrouped to discuss the previous Tribal Council. Although Tyler and Will had voted against Dan, they explained to Dan their reasoning, which he accepted. The next day was Rodney's birthday, and he hoped that he would finally get to go on a reward trip to celebrate; Will told Rodney that he would give up his potential spot on the trip to make it happen. Reward challenge: Divided into two teams of three, the teams unspooled ribbons around a maypole to release a key to unlock planks. They then used the planks to assemble a ladder, and climbed up it to retrieve a bag of balls and navigate through an obstacle course. One teammate then used a foot-operated catapult to launch the balls into a series of nets. The first team to get a ball in all five nets won a trip to a local orphanage, where they delivered supplies to children and enjoyed a feast. Will was not chosen to participate in the challenge. Rodney forgot to bring the balls with him on the obstacle course, losing a lot of time for him, Dan, and Tyler, but they later caught up on the ball-launching portion. However, Mike was able to come from behind to win reward for him, Carolyn, and Sierra. No one decided to give up their reward to Rodney, which provoked his ire. After enjoying the reward trip, Carolyn considered aligning with Mike. Back at camp, an upset Rodney plotted that he would pretend that he wanted to quit the game in hopes that Mike would not play his idol and would be blindsided, though no one else believed it would work. When Carolyn, Mike, and Sierra returned, Rodney began his charade, which Mike saw right through. Tyler, knowing that Mike would likely vote against him, asked Carolyn to play her idol on him. Immunity challenge: The castaways leaned backward on a perch while holding onto a knotted rope, moving their hands farther down the rope at regular intervals. The last castaway remaining won immunity. Carolyn outlasted Mike and Tyler to win immunity. Carolyn proposed to Dan, Rodney, and Sierra that they split their votes between Mike and Tyler, but Carolyn also plotted with Tyler and Will to blindside Dan due to the extra vote advantage he won at the Survivor Auction. Mike told Carolyn that he was voting for Tyler, and she found herself torn between betraying her long-time ally Tyler or getting rid of Dan and his advantage. At Tribal Council, Mike again claimed he would play his idol, which he ultimately did, voiding the four votes against him; Carolyn and Sierra joined Mike in voting against Tyler, and he was sent to the jury.
453	13	"My Word Is My Bond"	Recap	2.3/8	May 13, 2015	9.61	7
Having used his hidden immunity idol, Mike knew that he would be voted out unless he won immunity or found a new ally. Though Dan, formerly Mike's closest ally, felt confident with his new alliance, Carolyn considered working with Mike to blindside Dan to ensure the target stayed off of her, telling Mike about Dan's extra vote advantage. Reward challenge: Divided into two teams of three, the castaways raced through a series of obstacles, untied knots to release a drawbridge, then used a hatchet to release puzzle pieces; the first team to solve the puzzle won a helicopter tour of Nicaragua and a surf and turf lunch. Both teams were stuck on the word puzzle for over half an hour until Carolyn was able to decipher host Jeff Probst's clues to win the challenge for her, Mike, and Will. Carolyn openly considered giving up her reward to Rodney, who had yet to go on a reward trip, but ultimately decided against it. On the reward trip, Mike proposed a final three deal with Carolyn and Will, which Carolyn entertained, though Will was more hesitant. Mike told them that he did not want to lose to Rodney due to his attitude and outbursts, and they agreed. Back at camp, an irate Rodney targeted Carolyn for not giving up her reward to him. After returning from the reward, Mike tried to convince Sierra that Dan wouldn't take her to the end of the game. Immunity challenge: The castaways used a grappling hook to retrieve three bags; they then used a ball in one of the bags to navigate a table maze. The first castaway to navigate their ball to the center of the maze won immunity. Mike was the first to the table maze and, despite Sierra nearly catching up, ultimately maintained his lead to win immunity for the third time. The majority alliance (sans Carolyn) settled on voting for Carolyn as a threat, while lying to Mike and saying that Dan was the target due to his advantage; Mike then used this to try to tell Dan that he was the target, but Dan didn't believe him. Mike then tried to work with Carolyn and Sierra, telling them that Rodney and Will were siding with Dan, and Carolyn considered playing her hidden immunity idol. At Tribal Council, Dan decided to use his extra vote advantage, but Carolyn countered by playing her hidden immunity idol. The five votes against Carolyn were voided, and Dan was sent to the jury with Mike and Carolyn's votes.
454	14	"It's A Fickle, Fickle Game"	Recap	2.3/7	May 20, 2015	9.74	5
Despite the fact that her allies Rodney, Sierra, and Will voted against her but Mike did not, Carolyn decided to regroup with her old alliance and continued targeting Mike. Before the reward challenge, the castaways were reunited with their loved ones: Carolyn's husband Joel, Mike's mother Deborah, Rodney's father Rodney Sr., Sierra's father Danny, and Will's wife Monifa. Reward challenge: The castaways crawled through a net and slid tiles down a shuffleboard, then balanced the tiles on a machete through an obstacle course; once all the tiles were through, the castaway used them to solve a combination lock. The winning castaway won an afternoon at camp with their loved one and an advantage in the next immunity challenge. Mike won the challenge, and enjoyed the afternoon with his mother. Immunity challenge: The castaways were blindfolded in the center of a large maze and raced to find four medallions in the corners of the maze. The castaway who found four medallions and then found the immunity necklace won immunity. The morning of the challenge, Mike had 30 minutes to practice navigating the maze blindfolded with Deborah there to guide him, but they struggled. At the challenge, Carolyn, Rodney, Sierra and Will helped each other, but Mike's advantage paid off and he won the challenge. Mike made a final three deal with Carolyn and Sierra, and another with Rodney and Will; at Tribal Council, Sierra mentioned that she was a threat, and ultimately Carolyn joined the men to vote her out. Immunity challenge: The castaways untied knots to open a gate, then raced up a large tower to retrieve a key; after sliding down a waterslide, the castaways then navigated a vertical obstacle course and used the key to unlock a bag of puzzle pieces. After retrieving three bags of puzzle pieces, the castaways used the pieces to build a lighthouse puzzle; the first castaway to complete their puzzle won immunity. Mike maintained his early lead to win his fifth and final immunity challenge. Rodney and Will stuck together and decided to vote Carolyn out, but Mike told Carolyn that he was going to force a tie with her against Rodney, and encouraged her to practice making fire to win the tiebreaker challenge. At Tribal Council, Mike forced the tie between Carolyn and Rodney; after an hour, Carolyn won the fire-making tiebreaker challenge to join Mike and Will in the finals, and Rodney became the final member of the jury. After enjoying a feast for making it to the end of the game, the final three faced the jury for their final Tribal Council. Joe told the finalists what they needed to do for the jury to earn his vote, while Hali asked Carolyn how her role as a mother disadvantaged her in the game; Carolyn explained that she fought hard despite being much older than most of the other castaways. Rodney asked Will how he was true to himself, and Will explained that he used his social game and giving nature to compensate for his lack of Survivor knowledge; he then asked Carolyn to explain the moves she made on her own, and she said it was blindsiding Tyler and Dan. Tyler asked Mike what he brought to the game socially, and Mike admitted that his social game wasn't as strong as he would've liked to be; Tyler asked Carolyn to redeem herself for backstabbing him after 30 days of being closest allies, and Carolyn stated that she had to or else he would've won, but that it was the most difficult decision she made. Sierra asked Will which of the other finalists' traits he wanted; he said Mike's work ethic and Carolyn's analytical skills. Jenn called the jury out for being bitter against Mike's manic, back-against-the-wall gameplay, and pled for them to vote for him to win. Dan chastised Mike for not caring about the people sent to the jury, and Mike told Dan that he regretted losing his trust after his actions at the Survivor Auction, and apologized to him; Dan accepted the apology. Shirin castigated Will for comments he made about her family, and praised Mike for defending her, though she stated that, as a superfan of the game, she was going to vote based on their games; Shirin likened each of their games to an animal: Mike's to a howler monkey, Carolyn's to a stingray, and Will's to a dead fish.
455	15	"Reunion"	TBA	1.8/6	May 20, 2015	7.21	14
Months after the final Tribal Council, at the live reunion, it was revealed that Mike won the game with Hali, Joe, Jenn, Shirin, Tyler, and Dan's votes, while Carolyn and Will tied for second with one vote each; Carolyn with Sierra's, and Will with Rodney's. The cast for Survivor: Cambodia was also revealed, as chosen by public vote. Of the five Worlds Apart candidates, Joe and Shirin were chosen to be among the 20 competitors to play in the following season; Mike was ineligible due to his victory, and Carolyn and Max were not selected. At the end of the reunion, Joe, Shirin and the other 18 chosen castaways were immediately put on a bus to begin their trip to Cambodia.

== Voting history ==
	Original tribes					Switched tribes		Merged tribe										
Episode	1	2	3	4		5	6	7	8	9	10	11	12	13		14		
Day	3	6	8	11		14	16	19	22	24	27	29	32	35		37	38	
Tribe	Masaya	Nagarote	Nagarote	Escameca		Nagarote	Escameca	Merica	Merica	Merica	Merica	Merica	Merica	Merica		Merica	Merica	
Eliminated	So	Vince	Nina	Tie (Note: The first Tribal Council vote resulted in a tie. Per the rules, a second vote was held where the castaways involved in the tie would not vote and the remaining castaways could only vote for those who tied.)	Lindsey	Max	Joaquin	Kelly	Hali	Joe	Jenn	Shirin	Tyler	Dan		Sierra	Tie (Note: The last Tribal Council vote resulted in a tie. As there were only four castaways remaining, the two tied castaways competed in a fire making challenge to resolve the tie.)	Rodney
Votes	4–2	3–2–1	3–2	2–2–2	3–0–0	5–2	4–3	4–1–0 (Note: Jenn played a hidden immunity idol, therefore seven votes against her were not counted.)	7–4	5–4–1	5–3–1	4–2–2	3–0 (Note: Mike played a hidden immunity idol, therefore four votes against him were not counted.)	2–0 (Note: Carolyn played a hidden immunity idol, therefore five votes against her were not counted.)		4–1	2–2	Challenge (Note: Rodney lost to Carolyn in the fire making tiebreaker challenge.)
Voter	Vote																	
Mike				Lindsey	Lindsey		Joaquin	~~Jenn~~	Hali	Joe	Jenn	Tyler	Tyler	Dan		Sierra	Rodney	
Carolyn	So					Max		~~Jenn~~	Hali	Jenn	Jenn	Shirin	Tyler	Dan		Sierra	Rodney	Won
Will		Vince	Nina			Max		Hali	Hali	Jenn	Jenn	Dan	~~Mike~~	~~Carolyn~~		Sierra	Carolyn	
Rodney				Sierra	None (Note: This player was not eligible to vote in the second round of voting.)		Joe	~~Jenn~~	Hali	Joe	Shirin	Shirin	~~Mike~~	~~Carolyn~~		Sierra	Carolyn	Lost
Sierra				Rodney	None		Joaquin	~~Jenn~~	Hali	Joe	Shirin	Shirin	Tyler	~~Carolyn~~		Rodney		
Dan				Lindsey	Lindsey		Joaquin	~~Jenn~~	Hali	Joe	Shirin	Shirin	~~Mike~~	~~Carolyn~~	~~Carolyn~~ (Note: This player played an extra vote advantage, allowing them to cast two ballots during a single vote.)			
Tyler	So						Joe	~~Jenn~~	Hali	Jenn	Jenn	Dan	~~Mike~~					
Shirin	So					Will		Kelly	Dan	Joe	Jenn	Tyler						
Jenn		Vince	Nina			Max		Kelly	Dan	Dan	Carolyn							
Joe		Nina	Nina				Joaquin	Kelly	Dan	Jenn								
Hali		Vince	Will			Max		Kelly	Dan									
Kelly				Sierra	Lindsey	Max		~~Jenn~~										
Joaquin	Carolyn						Joe											
Max	So					Will												
Lindsey				Rodney	None													
Nina		Jenn	Will															
Vince		Jenn																
So	Carolyn																	

Jury vote
Episode	15		
Day	39		
Finalist	Mike	Carolyn	Will
Votes	6–1–1		
Juror	Vote		
Rodney			Yes
Sierra		Yes	
Dan	Yes		
Tyler	Yes		
Shirin	Yes		
Jenn	Yes		
Joe	Yes		
Hali	Yes		

== Production ==
It was the fourth Survivor season filmed in San Juan del Sur, Nicaragua, and on the same location as Survivor: Nicaragua, Survivor: Redemption Island, and Survivor: San Juan del Sur, tying it with the Philippines and Samoa for the most number of Survivor seasons filmed in one country, although all three would be surpassed by Fiji after Survivor: Ghost Island (season 36). It features three tribes of six new players divided by social class: white collar, blue collar, and no collar. This season introduced the concept of an extra vote, in which one player can vote twice at a single Tribal Council, which was offered during the season's Survivor Auction. This season also saw the return of the firemaking tiebreaker challenge in the final four, last used in Survivor: Gabon.

== Reception ==
Despite Jeff Probst hyping up the season as one of the best and suggesting that the winner would become "one of the favorite winners of all time," reception for Worlds Apart was mostly negative. Critics lambasted the negativity and unlikability of the cast, as well as the predictability of the season.

In a poll conducted by Dalton Ross of Entertainment Weekly, Worlds Apart was ranked as the 5th worst season out of the first 35 seasons of Survivor. Ross himself ranked it 29th out of the 40 aired seasons, stating that there were "not enough people to root for" and criticized Dan Foley's and Will Sims's actions during the season. Worlds Apart was also ranked as the 4th worst season by fan site "The Purple Rock Podcast" in 2020, stating that the cast "quickly disappoints," and that the winner "becomes obvious fairly early on." In 2015, a poll by Rob Has a Podcast and Rob Cesternino ranked Worlds Apart 20th out of 30. This was updated in 2021 during Cesternino's podcast, Survivor All-Time Top 40 Rankings, ranking 35th. In 2020, Inside Survivor ranked this season 36th out of 40 saying that the season had potential during the pre-merge but took a "disturbing turn" after the Survivor Auction. In 2024, Nick Caruso of TVLine ranked this season 39th out of 47.
