= Logo Motion =

2011 FIRST Robotics Competition game

- Year: 2011

Season Information
- Number of teams: 2,075
- Number of regionals: 50 (including MI championship)
- Number of district events: 9
- Championship location: Edward Jones Dome, St Louis, Missouri

FIRST Championship Awards
- Chairman's Award winner: Team 359 - "The Hawaiian Kids"
- Woodie Flowers Award winner: John Larock - Team 365
- Founder's Award winner: The Boeing Company
- Gracious Professionalism Winner: Team 118 - "The Robonauts"
- Champions: Team 254 - "The Cheesy Poofs"; Team 111 - "Wildstang"; Team 973 - "The Greybots"

Links
- Website: http://www.usfirst.org/roboticsprograms/frc
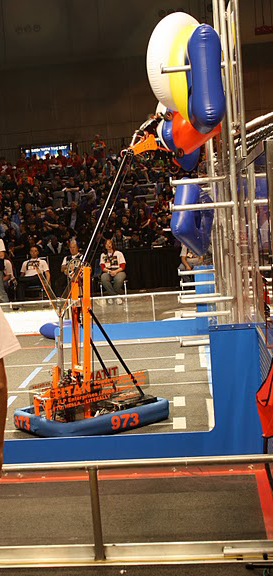
- Championship Winning Team 973 “The GreyBots” placing a tube

Logo Motion is the 2011 FIRST Robotics Competition game. Playing pieces are inner tubes shaped like the components of the FIRST logo. The primary objective of the game is to place them on racks to gain points. In the endgame, robots deploy smaller robots ("minibots") to climb a tower. Minibots must be made from the FIRST Tech Challenge kit of parts. The game celebrates the 20th season of the FRC and is also meant to commemorate the artist Jack Kamen, who designed the original FIRST logo.

== Kickoff ==
The kickoff, the first event of the 2011 FRC season, was held on January 8 at the Southern New Hampshire University and simulcast to numerous regional kickoffs throughout the United States, Canada, and Mexico. Speakers included Walt Havenstein, Jon Dudas, Dean Kamen, Neal Bascomb, Amir Abo-Shaeer, Dave Lavery and will.i.am. It was broadcast live on NASA TV starting at 1030 EST.

As per previous years' competitions, Dave Lavery produced and narrated the official game animation video. New Hampshire businessman and FIRST official Blair Hundertmark assisted in the production of the video.

== Rules ==
=== Match periods ===
A match is 135 seconds long.

- Autonomous - first 15 seconds. Code on the robots is remotely activated, and robots may react to sensor inputs and commands programmed into the robot's onboard control system. The robot tries to score Ubertubes onto pegs on the scoring grid.
- Teleoperated - 105 seconds after the Autonomous Period. Humans using a console drive their robots around the field, trying to score points using any game piece except for Ubertubes.
- Minibot Race - final 15 seconds. At fifteen seconds to the end, the tower bases flash their alliance color. Minibots may be deployed onto the towers in the final 10 seconds to score extra points. They may only be deployed during this period. The robots can still score the game tubes.

=== Alliances ===
As per previous years' competitions, three teams are on each alliance, red and blue. Each team may have one robot on the field. That robot may be remotely controlled by a driver after the autonomous period.

=== Field ===
LogoMotion field

As per previous years' competitions, the playing field is 27-feet wide by 54-feet long. The floor consists of gray carpet. On each end of the field, there are scoring grids immediately in front of the alliance stations, where robots are remotely controlled by drivers. Each alliance station is protected by a wall, known as the alliance wall. On each alliance wall, there are two scoring grids. Each scoring grid has 9 pegs arranged like a square. Each row is 37 inches above the next, except on the outside columns in each grid, where the bottom peg is only 30 inches above the ground.

There are openings in the alliance wall, called feeding slots, in every corner, where an alliance member may enter playing pieces into play. However, to get from the scoring grid to your alliance's feeding slot, you must transverse the field. Thus, many teams elect to throw tubes onto the field and have their alliance's robots pick them from the ground.

Four towers with cylindrical bases are in the middle of the field. The towers are used in the endgame for alliances to earn up to 30 or more points. To assist teams in driving and programming a robot through an almost completely open field, there is colored tape on the floor to allow for sensor calibration and to create visual reference points. Furthermore, the tape delineates areas where certain robots may or may not traverse.

=== Playing pieces ===
- Ubertube - a yellow, circular inner tube. It may only be used during the autonomous period.
- Minibot - an FTC robot or a normal small robot

The following make up the FIRST Logo.

- Triangle - a red, triangular inner tube
- Circle - a white, circular inner tube
- Square - a blue, square inner tube

=== Scoring ===
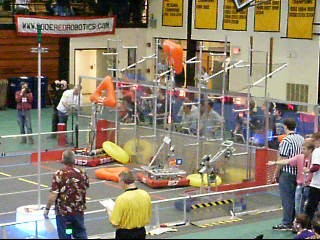
Teams 3357 and 857 scoring tubes at the Traverse City district.

The following is a scoring chart for the Ubertube as they are hung on the end field walls, during the autonomous period.

On bottom row	2 Points
On middle row	4 Points
On top row	6 Points

The following is a scoring chart for the game pieces as they are hung on the end field walls, during tele-operated mode (human remote controlled period). Any tube that is part of a non-Ubertube triangle-circle-square group (depicting the FIRST logo) is worth double of the listed points.

Logo Piece	Alone	Over Ubertube
NOT Hanging	0 Points	0 Points
Hanging on Bottom Row	1 Point	2 Points
Hanging on Middle Row	2 Points	4 Points
Hanging on Top Row	3 Points	6 Points

The following is a scoring chart for the mini-bot, a smaller FTC robot deployed during the end game period. The end game is a race between four mini bots to reach the top of tower pole on the field.

1st mini-bot to reach the top	30 Points
2nd mini-bot to reach the top	20 Points
3rd mini-bot to reach the top	15 Points
4th mini-bot to reach the top	10 Points

Based on the information above, the number of points an alliance may score is capped at 158, as game pieces may not be de-scored.

=== Robots ===
Robot rules are similar to other years with the exception of the minibot. A notable difference is that while a robot must start the match within 38"x28"x60", it may expand to an 84" diameter cylinder with no height constraints. Minibot has to be 12"x12"x12" and it can't be used during the match before the Minbot race.

== World Championships ==
The World Championships for Logo Motion was held at the Edward Jones Dome in St Louis, Missouri.

=== Final Round at Einstein Field ===
Semifinals
(Canada) (United States) 25 - 1503 - 217	104	72	N/P	0W
(United States) 254 - 111 - 973	119	136	N/P	2W
(Canada) (United States) 177 - 781 - 2016	112	130	N/P	2W
(United States) 968 - 51 - 987	107	97	N/P	0W

Finals
(United States) 254 - 111 - 973	147	136	N/P	2W
(Canada) (United States) 177 - 781 - 2016	79	91	N/P	0W
