= Lunacy (FIRST) =

2009 FIRST Robotics Competition game

- Year: 2009

Season Information
- Number of teams: 1,677
- Number of regionals: 41 (including MI championship)
- Number of district events: 7
- Championship location: Georgia Dome, Atlanta, Georgia

FIRST Championship Awards
- Chairman's Award winner: Team 236 - "Techno Ticks"
- Woodie Flowers Award winner: John Novak - Team 16
- Champions: Team 111 - "WildStang"; Team 67 - "The HOT Team"; Team 971 - "Spartan Robotics"
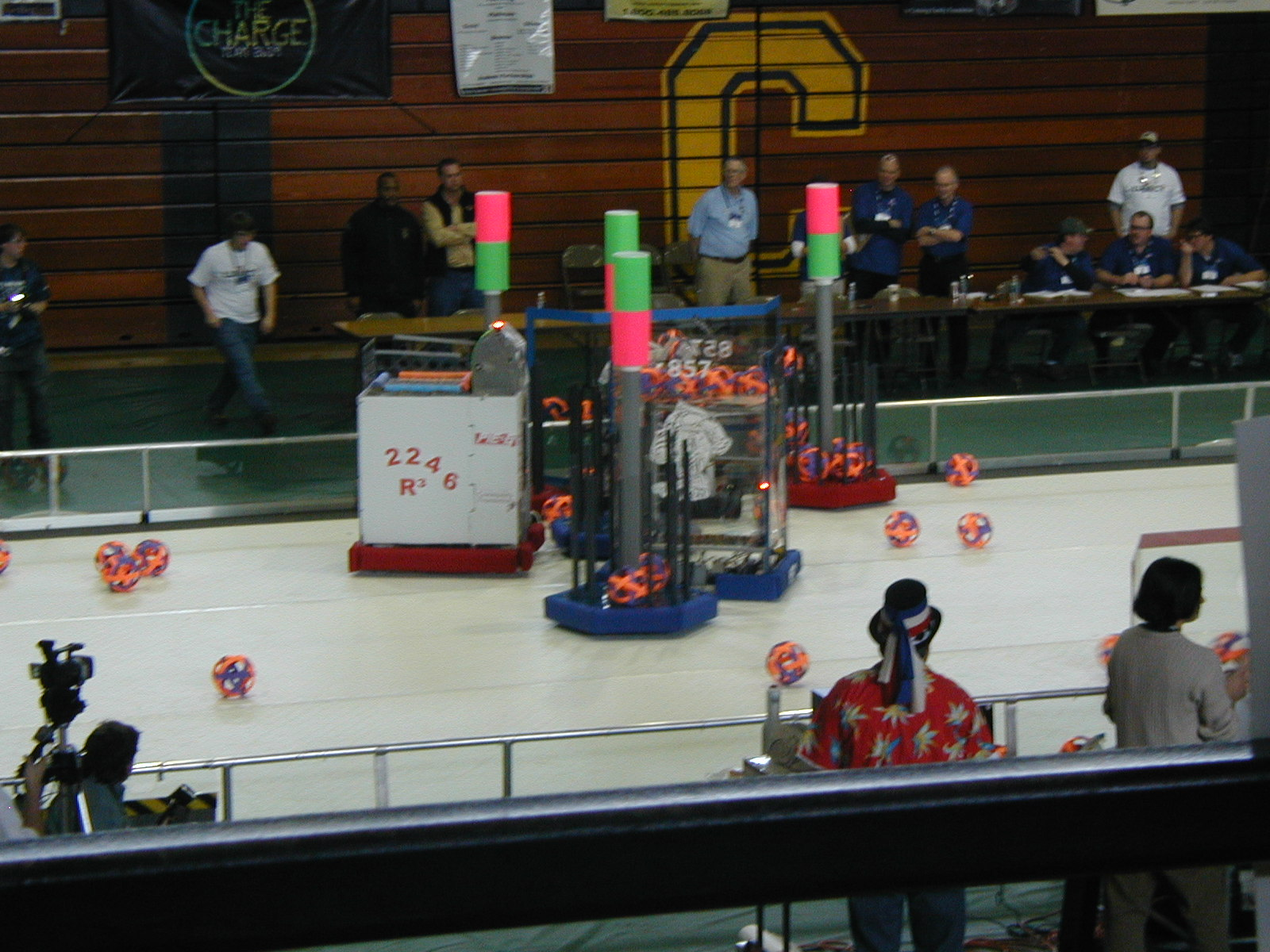
- Teams 857 and 2246 at the Traverse City district competition

Lunacy is the game for the 2009 FIRST Robotics Competition. Announced on January 3, 2009, the name and some of the features of the game honor the 40th anniversary of the first human mission to the Moon (Latin: Luna). It is FRC's 18th game. This is the first FRC competition to use the cRIO Mobile Device Controller control system from National Instruments. The driver station introduced for 2009 was the Kwikbyte DS, which was replaced in 2010 by the Classmate PC.

== Game overview ==
=== Scoring ===
- Moon Rocks (Orange and Purple) — 120 available — 2 points each
- Empty Cells (Orange and Blue) — Up to 8 — 2 points each
- Super Cells (Green and Purple) — Up to 8 — 15 points each

Total score for the alliance is the total number of points scored by placing Moon Rocks, Empty Cells and Super Cells in the trailers of all of the robots of the opposing alliance, less any deductions for penalties.

=== Field ===
Lunacy field

Lunacy is played on a rectangular field that is 54' by 27'. This field floor is made of Glasliner Fibre-reinforced plastic manufactured by and is referred to as 'Regolith'. The regolith is designed so that the robots, which have specially mandated wheels that teams may not modify in any way, have reduced traction, mimicking the effect of low gravity that would be seen by a robot driving on the Moon.

=== Alliances ===
There are six robots on the field at a time, three on the red alliance and three on the blue alliance. Each team consists of four players - two drivers, a coach and a human player. There are a total of six human players, three on each alliance since there are three teams per alliance. Each alliance is assigned the two corner positions at either end of one long side of the field, and one position in the middle of the opposite long side of the field. All human players start with 20 Moon Rocks, and the players in the middle have, in addition to the 20 Moon Rocks, four Empty Cells. Each team can place up to seven of their 20 Moon Rocks into their robot before the competition begins, but each human player must retain at least 13 Moon Rocks to start.

=== Robots ===
Robots have to fit within a 38" by 28" footprint, be less than or equal to 60" tall, and weigh under or equal to 120 pounds. The robots drag trailers behind them that correspond to the color of the alliance they are on. It is not possible for a robot to have any mechanism that takes Moon Rocks out of their trailer, or prevent another robot or human player from placing balls into their trailer. Robots must have bumpers on them in order to protect from damage from the collisions that will inevitably occur.

=== Game Play ===
The goal of the game is to score as many of the game pieces in the opposing side's trailers as possible. Robots start out in front of the opposite alliances' human players. There is a 15-second autonomous period, during which robots operate according to programs that teams download to their robot, and a 2-minute Teleoperated period, where robots are driven and controlled by a human drive subteam at one end of the field. Empty cells (also worth 2 points) must be handed to a robot by the "payload specialist" at the mid-field position known as the "outpost". The robot must deliver the Empty Cell to their human player on one of the corners in order to get a Super Cell that is worth 15 points. A robot can only carry one Empty Cell at a time. Super Cells can only be put into play during the last 20 seconds of play, and only if the human player has been delivered an Empty Cell.

== Common Robot Types ==
=== Shooter ===
"Shooter" robots were able to shoot one ball at a time, usually over a long range. Successful shooters were fairly uncommon, and often did not directly score. Instead, they shot balls to the Human Players at the corners. Self-reloading was very common amongst the shooters.

=== Dump bot ===
"Dumper" bots typically started out the match with their entire supply of balls for the match, which scored by driving alongside the opponent's trailer and dumping all their balls into the trailer.

=== Vomit bot ===
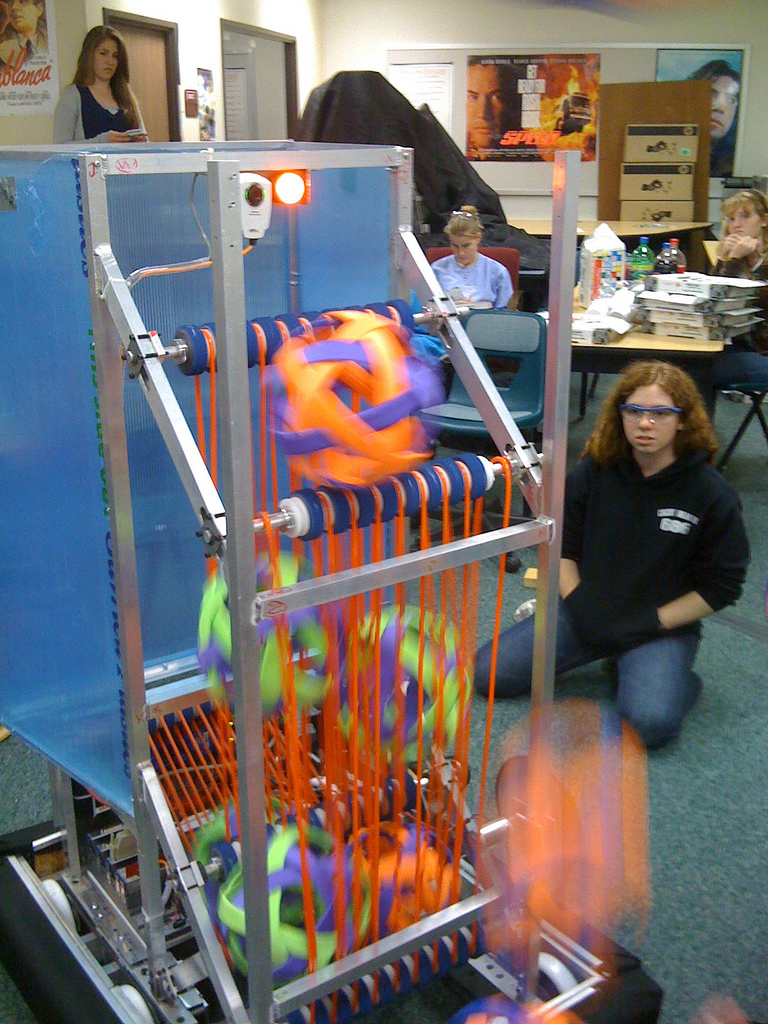

"Vomit" bots, also called "power dumpers", were a hybrid between the shooter and the dumper. They were often the best robots, combining the accuracy of the shooter with the massive scoring of the dumper. These robots would drive up to an opponent's trailer and "vomit" a stream of balls into the trailer, (often as many as 10 or more at once). Many were self reloading, and were the rarest type of robot.

=== Dozer bot ===
"Dozer" bots were the most common, and often the least effective robots. These robots were bulldozer-like in function, pushing the balls to the corners. Some were just boxes that towed a trailer.

== Competition schedule ==
- Kickoff — January 3, 2009
- Shipping deadline — February 17, 2009
- Regional competitions — weekends, February 28, 2009 – April 6, 2009
- Championship — April 16, 2009 – April 18, 2009

== Events ==
=== Regionals ===
The following regional events were held in 2009:

- Arizona Regional - Phoenix
- BAE Systems Granite State Regional - Manchester, NH
- Bayou Regional - New Orleans
- Boilermaker Regional - West Lafayette, IN
- Boston Regional - Boston
- Buckeye Regional - Cleveland, OH
- Chesapeake Regional - Annapolis, MD
- Colorado Regional - Denver
- Connecticut Regional - Hartford, CT
- Dallas Regional - Dallas
- Finger Lakes Regional - Rochester, NY
- Florida Regional - Orlando
- Greater Kansas City Regional - Kansas City, MO
- Greater Toronto Regional - Mississauga, ON
- Hawaii Regional - Honolulu
- Israel Regional - Tel Aviv, Israel
- Las Vegas Regional - Las Vegas
- Lone Star Regional - Houston
- Los Angeles Regional - Long Beach, CA
- Microsoft Seattle Regional - Seattle
- Midwest Regional - Chicago
- Minnesota 10000 Lakes Regional - Minneapolis
- Minnesota North Star Regional - Minneapolis
- NASA VCU Regional - Richmond, VA
- New Jersey Regional - Trenton, NJ
- New York City Regional - New York City
- Oklahoma City Regional - Oklahoma City
- Oregon Regional - Portland
- Palmetto Regional - Clemson, SC
- Peachtree Regional - Duluth, GA
- Philadelphia Regional - Philadelphia
- Pittsburgh Regional - Pittsburgh
- St. Louis Regional - St. Louis
- Sacramento Regional - Davis, CA
- San Diego Regional - San Diego
- SBPLI Long Island Regional - Hempstead, NY
- Silicon Valley Regional - San Jose, CA
- Washington DC Regional - Washington, DC
- Waterloo Regional - Waterloo, ON
- Wisconsin Regional - Milwaukee

<===Districts===> 2009 was the first year that district competitions were held; as part of FIRST in Michigan. The district events led up to the Michigan State Championship in Ypsilanti.

- Traverse City FIRST Robotics District Competition - Traverse City
- Kettering University FIRST Robotics District Competition - Flint
- Cass Tech FIRST Robotics District Competition - Detroit
- Detroit FIRST Robotics District Competition - Detroit
- Lansing FIRST Robotics District Competition - Lansing
- West Michigan FIRST Robotics District Competition - Allendale
- Troy FIRST Robotics District Competition - Troy

=== World Championship ===
The 2009 FRC World Championships were held at the Georgia Dome in Atlanta, Georgia.

==== Final Rounds ====
Semifinals
(United States) 121 - 1507 - 177 | 82 | 70 | N/P | 0W
(United States) 67 - 111 - 971 | 88 | 123 | N/P | 2W
(United States) 2753 - 222 - 1218 | 84 | 66 | N/P | 0W
(United States) 247 - 68 - 217 | 92 | 113 | N/P | 2W

Finals
(United States) 67 - 111 - 971 | 100 | 98 | N/P | 2W
(United States) 217 - 68 - 247 | 68 | 81 | N/P | 0W
