= List of awards and nominations received by Katy Perry =

Katy Perry awards and nominations
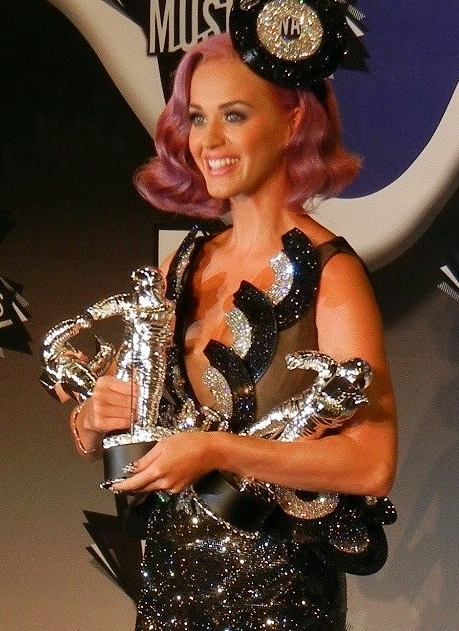
- Perry attending the 2011 MTV Video Music Awards
Awards and nominations
Award	Wins	Nominations
3D Creative Arts Awards	1	1
4Music Video Honors	5	13
American Music Awards	5	14
American Reality Television Awards	1	1
amfAR Gala	1	1
APRA Awards	0	2
ARIA Music Awards	0	2
ARIA Number One Chart Awards	7	7
ASCAP Pop Music Awards	16	16
Awwwards	1	1
BBC Music Awards	0	1
BBC Radio 1's Teen Awards	0	2
BDS Certified Spin Awards	22	22
Best of Las Vegas	1	1
BevNET Awards	2	2
Billboard Fan Army Face-Off	0	6
Billboard Latin Music Awards	1	2
Billboard Mid-Year Awards	1	9
Billboard Music Awards	5	36
Billboard New Music Polls	4	10
Billboard Readers' Polls	5	14
Billboard Touring Awards	1	3
Billboard Women in Music	2	2
Bizarre Awards	1	1
Bravo Otto	0	11
Bravo's A-List Awards	0	4
Bravoora	1	5
BreakTudo Awards	0	9
Brit Awards	1	6
Brit Billion Award	1	1
British LGBT Awards	0	1
BT Digital Music Awards	0	2
Canadian Fragrance Awards	1	1
Canadian Radio Music Awards	0	1
Capital Awards	6	9
Capricho Awards de Gato Nacional	4	13
Channel V Thailand Music Video Awards	0	2
Chart Attack	1	2
Clio Awards	4	4
CMT Music Awards	0	2
The Colleagues	1	1
Cosmopolitan Ultimate Women of the Year Awards	1	1
Creative Circle	2	2
Creative Loafing's Best of the Bay	2	2
Creative Review Awards	1	1
D&AD Pencil Awards	4	5
Danish Music Awards	0	2
Digital Spy Reader Awards	6	6
Do Something Awards	0	1
The DVF Awards	1	1
Echo Music Prize	0	2
Electronic Dance Music Awards	1	1
Elle Style Awards	1	1
Emmy Awards	0	1
Eska Music Awards	1	1
Eurobest European Advertising Festival	2	2
FHM	7	7
FHM Australia	1	1
FiFi Awards	4	4
Fuse Top 40	2	6
Gaffa Awards	1	4
Gaygalan Awards	1	1
Glamour Awards	2	2
Glass Slipper Awards	1	1
Gracie Awards	1	1
Grammy Awards	0	13
Grindr Best of the Year Awards	1	1
Guinness World Records	20	20
Hit FM Music Awards	7	10
Hollywood Music Video Awards	0	1
Human Rights Campaign Gala	1	1
Hungarian Music Awards	0	1
iHeartRadio Music Awards	1	11
Inavation Awards	1	1
Inc.	1	1
International Dance Music Awards	0	10
IRMA Number One Awards	6	6
iVillage Entertainment Awards	1	1
IWSC Awards	2	2
J-14 Teen Icon Awards	1	10
JIM Awards	0	2
Juice TV Awards	2	2
Juno Awards	1	2
Just Drinks Awards	1	1
Las Culturistas Culture Awards	1	2
Latin Music Italian Awards	1	4
Lockdown Awards	1	1
Los 40 Music Awards	0	4
Los Premios 40 Principales América	0	1
Los Premios MTV Latinoamérica	1	5
Love Radio Awards	2	2
Lovie Awards	2	2
Magic	2	2
Maxim	1	1
Men's Health	1	1
Meus Prêmios Nick	0	13
MP3 Music Awards	2	4
MTV Australia Awards	1	1
MTV	1	1
MTV Europe Music Awards	6	34
MTV Hottest	0	7
MTV Italian Music Awards	0	9
MTV Millennial Awards Brazil	1	2
MTV Video Music Awards	7	33
MTV Video Music Awards Japan	2	8
MTV Video Music Brazil	0	5
MTV Video Play Awards	11	11
MuchMusic Video Awards	2	11
MVPA Awards	4	8
Myx Music Awards	2	4
NARM Music Awards	1	1
New Music Awards	6	6
Nickelodeon Kids' Choice Awards	4	17
Nickelodeon Abu Dhabi Kids' Choice Awards	1	1
Nickelodeon Argentina Kids' Choice Awards	0	2
Nickelodeon Australian Kids' Choice Awards	2	3
Nickelodeon Mexico Kids' Choice Awards	1	2
NME Awards	1	2
NMPA Songwriting Awards	28	28
Now That's What I Call Music! Awards	0	2
NRJ Music Awards	4	16
O Music Awards	0	5
The Official Number One Awards	3	3
The Official Specialist Number One Awards	13	13
The Official Vodafone Big Top 40 Number One Awards	8	8
OK!	2	2
The One Club for Creativity	1	1
People's Choice Awards	14	25
People's Choice Country Awards	0	1
PETA's Libby Awards	1	1
Pitchfork Readers Poll	1	1
Planeta Awards	3	12
Pollstar Awards	1	7
Popjustice Readers' Polls	26	26
Premios Juventud	0	3
Premios Oye!	0	4
Premios Tu Música Urbano	0	1
Premios Viva	4	5
Q Awards	0	2
QQ Music	1	1
Queerty Awards	0	1
The Radio Academy Awards	1	1
Radio Disney Music Awards	0	5
The Record of the Year	0	2
Record Report	3	3
Recording Industry Association of America	9	9
red! Star Awards	1	1
Ritmo Latino Entertainment Awards	1	1
Rockbjörnen	0	1
Rockol Awards	2	2
Rolling Stone Awards	2	2
RTHK International Pop Poll Awards	7	7
RTL 102.5 Power Hits Estate	0	6
San Francisco World Spirits Competition	2	2
Seed Awards	2	2
Shorty Awards	2	2
Shots Awards	1	1
Spark Animation Awards	1	1
Spike Guys Choice Awards	1	1
Spin Readers' Poll	0	1
Spotify Awards	10	10
StarShine Music Awards	1	7
Swiss Music Awards	0	1
Taste Awards	2	2
TEC Awards	0	3
Teen Choice Awards	6	39
Telehit Awards	3	8
Ticketmaster Awards	0	3
TikTok Buzzword Awards	0	1
Time Readers' Poll	2	2
Top Hit Music Awards	1	1
Top in Rock Awards	1	1
The Trevor Project	1	1
UK Festival Awards	0	1
UK Music Video Awards	0	1
UNICEF	1	1
Universal Music Greater China	1	1
Universal Music India Yearly Awards	1	1
USA Today 10Best Readers' Choice Awards	1	1
V Chart Awards	1	1
Variety	1	1
Vevo Certified Awards	26	26
Vevo Hot This Year Awards	4	4
VH1 Awards	2	2
Victoria's Secret What Is Sexy Awards	1	1
Virgin Media Music Awards	2	14
Voice Arts Awards	1	1
Webby Awards	12	13
Weibo Night	0	1
Weibo Starlight Awards	2	2
World Music Awards	1	3
WorldFest-Houston International Film Festival	1	1
WOWIE Awards	0	1
WWD's Beauty Inc Awards	1	1
YouTube Creator Awards	2	2
YouTube Music Awards	1	2
Z Awards	1	4
Žebřík Music Awards	4	4
Zlatý Otto	0	1

Totals (Note: Certain award groups do not simply award one winner. They acknowledge several different recipients, have runners-up, and have third place. Since this is a specific recognition and is different from losing an award, runner-up mentions are considered wins in this award tally. For simplification and to avoid errors, each award in this list has been presumed to have had a prior nomination.)
- Wins: 510
- Nominations: 1006

The American singer Katy Perry has received hundreds of awards and nominations throughout her career. Among other accolades, she is the recipient of five American Music Awards, 16 ASCAP Pop Music Awards, five Billboard Music Awards, 20 Guinness World Records, seven MTV Video Music Awards (including the Michael Jackson Video Vanguard Award), 14 People's Choice Awards, a Juno Award, a Brit Award, two Myx Music Awards, four NRJ Music Awards, two Shorty Awards, and 12 Webby Awards. Perry has also been nominated for a Swiss Music Award, two ARIA Music Awards, 8 MTV Italian Music Awards, 13 Grammy Awards, two Channel V Thailand Music Video Awards, two Q Awards, and two Danish Music Awards.

Perry's second studio album One of the Boys was released in 2008 and received the 2009 NRJ Music Award for International Album of the Year. Two singles from the album—"I Kissed a Girl" and "Hot n Cold"—were nominated for the Grammy Award for Best Female Pop Vocal Performance in 2009 and 2010, respectively. The former's music video received five MTV Video Music Award nominations and the MTV Video Music Award Japan for Best Pop Video. Perry received multiple Best New Artist nominations, including one at the Los Premios MTV Latinoamérica 2008, and won the 2008 MTV Europe Music Award for Best New Act and also won the 2009 Brit Award for International Female Solo Artist. Her third album, Teenage Dream, became the first by a female artist to produce five number-one US Billboard Hot 100 songs—"California Gurls", "Teenage Dream", "Firework", "E.T.", and "Last Friday Night (T.G.I.F.)". For the feat, she received a Special Achievement Award during the 2011 American Music Awards and an entry in the 2013 edition of Guinness World Records. The album was nominated for six Grammy Awards, including Album of the Year and Record of the Year for "Firework", and won the Juno Award for International Album of the Year.

Perry received ten nominations at the 2011 MTV Video Music Awards, winning Video of the Year for "Firework" along with Best Collaboration and Best Visual Effects for "E.T.". She became the first artist to be nominated for four different videos at a single ceremony. Her single "Wide Awake" from Teenage Dream: The Complete Confection—a reissue of Teenage Dream—was nominated for the Grammy Award for Best Pop Solo Performance. In 2012, Billboard magazine declared her the "Woman of the Year" for her contributions to music. Perry's fourth album, Prism, released in 2013, contained the singles "Roar" and "Dark Horse". The former was nominated for Song of the Year and Best Pop Solo Performance at the 56th Annual Grammy Awards. At the following ceremony, the album received a Best Pop Vocal Album nomination while "Dark Horse" was nominated for Best Pop Duo/Group Performance. "Dark Horse" won Single of the Year at the 2014 American Music Awards.

Perry additionally received the Audrey Hepburn Humanitarian Award from UNICEF in 2016, and won "Latin Pop/Urban Song of the Year" from the 2020 iHeartRadio Music Awards for a remix of "Con Calma" with Daddy Yankee and Snow. Her tenure as a judge alongside Lionel Richie and Luke Bryan on American Idol won Outstanding Judging Panel at the American Reality Television Awards in 2021. During the 2023 PETA's Libby Awards, a shoe line of hers titled Katy Perry Collections won Favorite Celeb Vegan Brand. At the 2024 MTV Video Music Awards, she received the Michael Jackson Video Vanguard Award. The following year, Perry received the Brit Billion Award from the British Phonographic Industry (BPI) for reaching one billion cumulative streams in the United Kingdom.

== Awards and nominations ==
Award	Year (Note: Indicates the year of ceremony. Each year is linked to the article about the awards held that year, wherever possible.)	Recipient(s)	Category	Result	Ref.
3D Creative Arts Awards	2013	Katy Perry: Part of Me	Best Motion Picture Live Event	Won	
4Music Video Honors
4Music Video Honors	2011	"E.T." (featuring Kanye West)	Best Video	Nominated	
4Music Video Honors	2011	"Last Friday Night (T.G.I.F.)"	Best Video	Nominated	
4Music Video Honors	2011	Katy Perry	Best Girl	Nominated	
4Music Video Honors	2012	"Part of Me"	Best Video	Nominated	
4Music Video Honors	2012	"Wide Awake"	Best Video	Nominated	
4Music Video Honors	2012	Perry	Best Girl	Nominated	
4Music Video Honors	2013	"Roar"	Best Video	Won	
4Music Video Honors	2013	Perry	Best Girl	Won	
4Music Video Honors	2014	Perry	Best Girl	Nominated	
4Music Video Honors	2014	Perry	Best Dressed	2nd	
4Music Video Honors	2014	"Dark Horse" (featuring Juicy J)	Best Video	Nominated	
4Music Video Honors	2014	"Dark Horse" (featuring Juicy J)	Flashiest Video	2nd	
4Music Video Honors	2014	"Dark Horse" (featuring Juicy J)	Strangest Video Plotline	5th	
American Music Awards (AMAs)
American Music Awards (AMAs)	2010	Perry	Artist of the Year	Nominated	
American Music Awards (AMAs)	2010	Perry	Favorite Pop/Rock Female Artist	Nominated	
American Music Awards (AMAs)	2010	Teenage Dream	Favorite Pop/Rock Album	Nominated	
American Music Awards (AMAs)	2011	Perry	Favorite Pop/Rock Female Artist	Nominated	
American Music Awards (AMAs)	2011	Perry	Favorite Adult Contemporary Artist	Nominated	
American Music Awards (AMAs)	2011	Perry	Artist of the Year	Nominated	
American Music Awards (AMAs)	2011	Perry	Special Achievement Award	Won	
American Music Awards (AMAs)	2012	Perry	Artist of the Year	Nominated	
American Music Awards (AMAs)	2012	Perry	Favorite Pop/Rock Female Artist	Won	
American Music Awards (AMAs)	2014	Perry	Artist of the Year	Nominated	
American Music Awards (AMAs)	2014	Perry	Favorite Pop/Rock Female Artist	Won	
American Music Awards (AMAs)	2014	Perry	Favorite Adult Contemporary Artist	Won	
American Music Awards (AMAs)	2014	Prism	Favorite Pop/Rock Album	Nominated	
American Music Awards (AMAs)	2014	"Dark Horse" (featuring Juicy J)	Single of the Year	Won	
American Reality Television Awards
American Reality Television Awards	2021	Perry, Lionel Richie, and Luke Bryan (for American Idol)	Outstanding Judging Panel	Won	
amfAR Gala
amfAR Gala	2018	Perry	Award of Courage	Won	
APRA Awards
APRA Awards	2011	"California Gurls" (featuring Snoop Dogg) (Note: The songwriters, Perry, Lukasz Gottwald, Max Martin, Benjamin Levin, Bonnie McKee, Brian Wilson, Michael Love, and Calvin Broadus, were nominated.)	International Work of the Year	Nominated	
APRA Awards	2020	"Never Really Over" (Note: The songwriters, Perry, Daniel James, Leah Haywood, Hayley Warner, Katy Perry, Gino Barletta, Michelle Buzz, Jason Gill, Dagny Sandvik, and Anton Zaslavski, were nominated.)	Most Performed Pop Work	Nominated	
ARIA Music Awards	2020				
ARIA Music Awards	2010	Perry	Most Popular International Artist	Nominated	
ARIA Music Awards	2014	Perry	Best International Artist	Nominated	
ARIA Number One Chart Awards
ARIA Number One Chart Awards	2014	Teenage Dream	Number-One Album	Won	
ARIA Number One Chart Awards	2014	Prism	Number-One Album	Won	
ARIA Number One Chart Awards	2014	"I Kissed a Girl"	Number-One Single	Won	
ARIA Number One Chart Awards	2014	"California Gurls" (featuring Snoop Dogg)	Number-One Single	Won	
ARIA Number One Chart Awards	2014	"Roar"	Number-One Single	Won	
ARIA Number One Chart Awards	2014	"Roar"	Year-End Number-One Single	Won	
ARIA Number One Chart Awards	2016	"Rise"	Number-One Single	Won	
ASCAP Pop Music Awards
ASCAP Pop Music Awards	2009	"I Kissed a Girl"	Most Performed Song	Won	
ASCAP Pop Music Awards	2009	"Hot n Cold"	Most Performed Song	Won	
ASCAP Pop Music Awards	2010	"Hot n Cold"	Most Performed Song	Won	
ASCAP Pop Music Awards	2010	"Waking Up in Vegas"	Most Performed Song	Won	
ASCAP Pop Music Awards	2011	"California Gurls" (featuring Snoop Dogg)	Most Performed Song	Won	
ASCAP Pop Music Awards	2011	"Teenage Dream"	Most Performed Song	Won	
ASCAP Pop Music Awards	2012	"Firework"	Most Performed Song	Won	
ASCAP Pop Music Awards	2012	"Teenage Dream"	Most Performed Song	Won	
ASCAP Pop Music Awards	2012	"E.T." (featuring Kanye West)	Most Performed Song	Won	
ASCAP Pop Music Awards	2012	"Last Friday Night (T.G.I.F.)"	Most Performed Song	Won	
ASCAP Pop Music Awards	2013	"The One That Got Away"	Most Performed Song	Won	
ASCAP Pop Music Awards	2013	"Part of Me"	Most Performed Song	Won	
ASCAP Pop Music Awards	2013	"Wide Awake"	Most Performed Song	Won	
ASCAP Pop Music Awards	2014	"Wide Awake"	Most Performed Song	Won	
ASCAP Pop Music Awards	2014	"Roar"	Most Performed Song	Won	
ASCAP Pop Music Awards	2015	"Black Widow"	Most Performed Song	Won	
Awwwards
Awwwards	2023	De Soi	Honorable Mention	Honoree	
BBC Music Awards
BBC Music Awards	2017	Perry at BBC Radio 1's Big Weekend	Live Performance of the Year	Nominated	
BBC Radio 1's Teen Awards	2017				
BBC Radio 1's Teen Awards	2017	Perry	Best International Solo Artist	Nominated	
BBC Radio 1's Teen Awards	2017	Perry	Most Entertaining Celebrity	Nominated	
BDS Certified Spin Awards		Perry			
BDS Certified Spin Awards	2009	"Waking Up in Vegas"	100,000 Spins	Won	
BDS Certified Spin Awards	2009	"Waking Up in Vegas"	200,000 Spins	Won	
BDS Certified Spin Awards	2009	"Hot n Cold"	500,000 Spins	Won	
BDS Certified Spin Awards	2009	"I Kissed a Girl"	300,000 Spins	Won	
BDS Certified Spin Awards	2009	"Waking Up in Vegas"	300,000 Spins	Won	
BDS Certified Spin Awards	2010	"California Gurls" (featuring Snoop Dogg)	100,000 Spins	Won	
BDS Certified Spin Awards	2010	"If We Ever Meet Again" (Timbaland featuring Perry)	50,000 Spins	Won	
BDS Certified Spin Awards	2010	"California Gurls" (featuring Snoop Dogg)	200,000 Spins	Won	
BDS Certified Spin Awards	2010	"Hot n Cold"	600,000 Spins	Won	
BDS Certified Spin Awards	2010	"Teenage Dream"	50,000 Spins	Won	
BDS Certified Spin Awards	2010	"California Gurls" (featuring Snoop Dogg)	400,000 Spins	Won	
BDS Certified Spin Awards	2010	"Firework"	50,000 Spins	Won	
BDS Certified Spin Awards	2010	"California Gurls" (featuring Snoop Dogg)	500,000 Spins	Won	
BDS Certified Spin Awards	2011	"Firework"	300,000 Spins	Won	
BDS Certified Spin Awards	2011	"Firework"	400,000 Spins	Won	
BDS Certified Spin Awards	2011	"Firework"	500,000 Spins	Won	
BDS Certified Spin Awards	2011	"E.T." (featuring Kanye West)	200,000 Spins	Won	
BDS Certified Spin Awards	2011	"Teenage Dream"	500,000 Spins	Won	
BDS Certified Spin Awards	2011	"E.T." (featuring Kanye West)	400,000 Spins	Won	
BDS Certified Spin Awards	2011	"Hot n Cold"	700,000 Spins	Won	
BDS Certified Spin Awards	2011	"California Gurls" (featuring Snoop Dogg)	600,000 Spins	Won	
BDS Certified Spin Awards	2011	"Firework"	600,000 Spins	Won	
Best of Las Vegas
Best of Las Vegas	2022	Perry	Best Strip Headliner	Won	
BevNET Awards	2022				
BevNET Awards	2022	De Soi	Best Packaging	Won	
BevNET Awards	2024	De Soi Spritz Italiano	Best Non-Alcoholic Cocktails	Won	
Billboard Fan Army Face-Off	2014	KatyCats	Strongest Fan Army	Nominated	
Billboard Fan Army Face-Off	2015	KatyCats	Strongest Fan Army	Nominated	
Billboard Fan Army Face-Off	2016	KatyCats	Strongest Fan Army	Nominated	
Billboard Fan Army Face-Off	2017	KatyCats	Strongest Fan Army	Nominated	
Billboard Fan Army Face-Off	2020	KatyCats	Strongest Fan Army	Nominated	
Billboard Fan Army Face-Off	2024	KatyCats	Strongest Fan Army	Nominated	
Billboard Latin Music Awards
Billboard Latin Music Awards	2012	Perry	Crossover Artist of the Year	Nominated	
Billboard Latin Music Awards	2020	Perry	Crossover Artist of the Year	Won	
Billboard Mid-Year Awards
Billboard Mid-Year Awards	2011	"Last Friday Night (T.G.I.F.)"	Best Music Video	Nominated	
Billboard Mid-Year Awards	2012	"Part of Me"	Best Music Video	Nominated	
Billboard Mid-Year Awards	2012	Perry's Divorce	Most Shocking Moments	Nominated	
Billboard Mid-Year Awards	2014	Perry	First-Half MVP	Nominated	
Billboard Mid-Year Awards	2014	"Dark Horse" (featuring Juicy J)	Favorite Number-One Hot 100 Song	Nominated	
Billboard Mid-Year Awards	2014	"Dark Horse" (featuring Juicy J)	Best Music Video	Nominated	
Billboard Mid-Year Awards	2014	"Birthday"	Best Music Video	Nominated	
Billboard Mid-Year Awards	2014	Prismatic World Tour	Best Tour	Nominated	
Billboard Mid-Year Awards	2015	Super Bowl XLIX halftime show (starring Perry)	Best Televised Performance	Won	
Billboard Music Awards
Billboard Music Awards	2011	Perry	Fan Favorite Award	Nominated	
Billboard Music Awards	2011	Perry	Top Hot 100 Artist	Won	
Billboard Music Awards	2011	Perry	Top Female Artist	Nominated	
Billboard Music Awards	2011	Perry	Top Radio Songs Artist	Nominated	
Billboard Music Awards	2011	Perry	Top Digital Songs Artist	Won	
Billboard Music Awards	2011	Perry	Pop Artist of the Year	Nominated	
Billboard Music Awards	2011	"California Gurls" (featuring Snoop Dogg)	Hot 100 Song of the Year	Nominated	
Billboard Music Awards	2011	"California Gurls" (featuring Snoop Dogg)	Top Digital Song	Nominated	
Billboard Music Awards	2011	"California Gurls" (featuring Snoop Dogg)	Pop Song of the Year	Nominated	
Billboard Music Awards	2011	"Firework"	Pop Song of the Year	Nominated	
Billboard Music Awards	2011	"Teenage Dream"	Pop Song of the Year	Nominated	
Billboard Music Awards	2011	Teenage Dream	Pop Album of the Year	Nominated	
Billboard Music Awards	2012	Perry	Spotlight Award	Won	
Billboard Music Awards	2012	Perry	Artist of the Year	Nominated	
Billboard Music Awards	2012	Perry	Hot 100 Artist of the Year	Nominated	
Billboard Music Awards	2012	Perry	Top Radio Songs Artist	Nominated	
Billboard Music Awards	2012	Perry	Top Female Artist	Nominated	
Billboard Music Awards	2012	Perry	Top Digital Songs Artist	Nominated	
Billboard Music Awards	2012	Perry	Pop Artist of the Year	Nominated	
Billboard Music Awards	2012	"E.T." (featuring Kanye West)	Hot 100 Song of the Year	Nominated	
Billboard Music Awards	2012	"E.T." (featuring Kanye West)	Top Digital Song	Nominated	
Billboard Music Awards	2012	"E.T." (featuring Kanye West)	Pop Song of the Year	Nominated	
Billboard Music Awards	2013	Perry	Top Social Artist	Nominated	
Billboard Music Awards	2014	Perry	Top Artist	Nominated	
Billboard Music Awards	2014	Perry	Top Female Artist	Won	
Billboard Music Awards	2014	Perry	Top Hot 100 Artist	Nominated	
Billboard Music Awards	2014	Perry	Top Digital Songs Artist	Won	
Billboard Music Awards	2014	Perry	Top Radio Songs Artist	Nominated	
Billboard Music Awards	2014	Perry	Top Streaming Artist	Nominated	
Billboard Music Awards	2014	"Roar"	Top Hot 100 Song	Nominated	
Billboard Music Awards	2014	"Roar"	Top Digital Song	Nominated	
Billboard Music Awards	2014	"Roar"	Top Radio Song	Nominated	
Billboard Music Awards	2014	"Roar"	Top Streaming Song (Video)	Nominated	
Billboard Music Awards	2015	Perry	Top Artist	Nominated	
Billboard Music Awards	2015	Perry	Top Female Artist	Nominated	
Billboard Music Awards	2015	Perry	Top Touring Artist	Nominated	
Billboard New Music Polls
Billboard New Music Polls	2020	"Daisies"	Favorite New Music of the Week	Nominated	
Billboard New Music Polls	2020	"Smile"	Favorite New Music of the Week	Nominated	
Billboard New Music Polls	2020	"What Makes a Woman"	Favorite New Music of the Week	Nominated	
Billboard New Music Polls	2021	"Electric"	Favorite New Music of the Week	Nominated	
Billboard New Music Polls	2024	"Woman's World"	Favorite New Music of the Week	Nominated	
Billboard New Music Polls	2024	"Lifetimes"	Favorite New Music of the Week	Nominated	
Billboard New Music Polls	2024	"I'm His, He's Mine" (featuring Doechii)	Favorite New Music of the Week	Won	
Billboard New Music Polls	2024	143	Favorite New Music of the Week	Won	
Billboard New Music Polls	2025	"Bandaids"	Favorite New Music of the Week	Won	
Billboard New Music Polls	2026	"Watch It Burn"	Favorite New Music of the Week	Won	
Billboard Readers' Polls
Billboard Readers' Polls	2010	Perry	Pop's Sexiest Stars – Female	Won	
Billboard Readers' Polls	2010	Teenage Dream	Favorite Album of the Year	6th	
Billboard Readers' Polls	2012	"California Gurls" (featuring Snoop Dogg)	Hot 100 March Madness	Nominated	
Billboard Readers' Polls	2012	"Teenage Dream"	Hot 100 March Madness	Nominated	
Billboard Readers' Polls	2012	"Firework"	Hot 100 March Madness	Nominated	
Billboard Readers' Polls	2012	"E.T." (featuring Kanye West)	Hot 100 March Madness	Nominated	
Billboard Readers' Polls	2012	"Last Friday Night (T.G.I.F.)"	Hot 100 March Madness	Nominated	
Billboard Readers' Polls	2012	"Part of Me"	Hot 100 March Madness	Nominated	
Billboard Readers' Polls	2013	"Roar"	Favorite Number-One Hot 100 Song	2nd	
Billboard Readers' Polls	2013	Perry and John Mayer	Hottest Couple	2nd	
Billboard Readers' Polls	2013	"Wide Awake"	Hot 100 March Madness	Nominated	
Billboard Readers' Polls	2014	"Roar"	Hot 100 March Madness	Nominated	
Billboard Readers' Polls	2014	"Dark Horse" (featuring Juicy J)	Hot 100 March Madness	Nominated	
Billboard Readers' Polls	2015	"Dark Horse" (featuring Juicy J)	Hot 100 March Madness	Won	
Billboard Touring Awards
Billboard Touring Awards	2011	Perry	Breakthrough Act	Nominated	
Billboard Touring Awards	2014	Prismatic World Tour	Top Package	Won	
Billboard Touring Awards	2014	Prismatic World Tour	Concert Marketing and Promotion Award	Nominated	
Billboard Women in Music
Billboard Women in Music	2012	Perry	Woman of the Year	Won	
Billboard Women in Music	2025	Perry	Top Women Artists of the 21st Century	Won	
Bizarre Awards		Perry			
Bizarre Awards	2013	Perry	Top Female Icon	Won	
Bravo Otto (Germany)		Perry			
Bravo Otto (Germany)	2010	Perry	Super Singer	Nominated	
Bravo Otto (Germany)	2011	Perry	Super Singer	Nominated	
Bravo Otto (Germany)	2011	Perry	Internet Star	Nominated	
Bravo Otto (Germany)	2012	Perry	Super Singer	Nominated	
Bravo Otto (Germany)	2013	Perry	Super Singer	Nominated	
Bravo Otto (Germany)	2013	Perry and Ellie Goulding	Super BFFs	Nominated	
Bravo Otto (Hungary)
Bravo Otto (Hungary)	2011	Perry	International Female Artist of the Year	Nominated	
Bravo Otto (Hungary)	2011	"Firework"	International Video of the Year	Nominated	
Bravo Otto (Hungary)	2012	Perry	International Female Artist of the Year	Nominated	
Bravo Otto (Hungary)	2014	Perry	International Female Artist of the Year	Nominated	
Bravo Otto (Hungary)	2014	"Roar"	International Song of the Year	Nominated	
Bravo's A-List Awards
Bravo's A-List Awards	2009	Perry	A-List Breakout	Nominated	
Bravo's A-List Awards	2009	Perry	A-List Artist of the Year	Nominated	
Bravo's A-List Awards	2009	Perry	A-List Kate	Nominated	
Bravo's A-List Awards	2009	"I Kissed a Girl"	A-List Download	Nominated	
Bravoora
Bravoora	2008	Perry	Best New Artist	Won	
Bravoora	2008	"I Kissed a Girl"	Hit Song of the Year	Nominated	
Bravoora	2011	Perry	Female Singer of the Year	Nominated	
Bravoora	2012	Perry	Female Singer of the Year	Nominated	
Bravoora	2013	Perry	Female Singer of the Year	Nominated	
BreakTudo Awards
BreakTudo Awards	2018	KatyCats	Best Fandom	Nominated	
BreakTudo Awards	2018	Witness: The Tour	Summer Tour of the Year	Nominated	
BreakTudo Awards	2019	"Never Really Over"	International Video of the Year	Nominated	
BreakTudo Awards	2019	"Con Calma" (remix with Daddy Yankee featuring Snow)	Collaboration of the Year	Nominated	
BreakTudo Awards	2020	"Daisies"	Song of the Year	Nominated	
BreakTudo Awards	2021	Smile	Album of the Year	Nominated	
BreakTudo Awards	2024	"Lifetimes"	Song of the Year	Nominated	
BreakTudo Awards	2025	"I'm His, He's Mine" (featuring Doechii)	International Collaboration of the Year	Nominated	
BreakTudo Awards	2026	"Watch It Burn"	International Video of the Year	Pending	
Brit Awards
Brit Awards	2009	Perry	International Female Solo Artist	Won	
Brit Awards	2011	Perry	International Female Solo Artist	Nominated	
Brit Awards	2011	Teenage Dream	International Album of the Year	Nominated	
Brit Awards	2014	Perry	International Female Solo Artist	Nominated	
Brit Awards	2018	"Feels" (Calvin Harris featuring Pharrell Williams, Perry, and Big Sean)	British Single of the Year	Nominated	
Brit Awards	2018	"Feels" (Calvin Harris featuring Pharrell Williams, Perry, and Big Sean)	British Video of the Year	Nominated	
Brit Billion Award
Brit Billion Award	2025	Perry	One Billion Streams in the United Kingdom	Won	
British LGBT Awards		Perry			
British LGBT Awards	2017	Perry	LGBT+ Music Artist of the Year	Nominated	
BT Digital Music Awards		Perry			
BT Digital Music Awards	2011	Perry	Artist of the Year	Nominated	
BT Digital Music Awards	2011	Perry	Best International Artist or Group	Nominated	
Canadian Fragrance Awards	2014	Killer Queen	Customers' Choice	Won	
Canadian Radio Music Awards	2013	Perry	International Solo Artist of the Year	Nominated	
Capital FM Music Video Awards	2013	Perry			
Capital FM Music Video Awards	2013	Perry	Best Actress	Won	
Capital FM Music Video Awards	2013	"Part of Me"	Best Video	Nominated	
Capital FM Music Video Awards	2013	"Wide Awake"	Best Use of Animals in a Video	Nominated	
Capital Loves Awards
Capital Loves Awards	2015	Perry	Best Female	Nominated	
Capital Twitter Awards	2015	Perry	Best Female		
Capital Twitter Awards	2014	Perry	Queen of Twitter	Won	
Capital's Sexiest		Perry			
Capital's Sexiest	2013	Perry	Sexiest Female in Pop	4th	
Capital's Sexiest	2014	Perry	Sexiest Female in Pop	8th	
Capital's Sexiest	2015	Perry	Sexiest Female in Pop	9th	
Capital's Sexiest	2018	Perry	Sexiest Female in Pop	Nominated	
Capricho Awards de Gato Nacional		Perry	Sexiest Female in Pop		
Capricho Awards de Gato Nacional	2010	Perry	International Female Singer	Won	
Capricho Awards de Gato Nacional	2010	Perry	More Stylish	Nominated	
Capricho Awards de Gato Nacional	2010	"California Gurls" (featuring Snoop Dogg)	International Hit	Nominated	
Capricho Awards de Gato Nacional	2011	"Firework"	International Hit	Nominated	
Capricho Awards de Gato Nacional	2011	Perry	International Female Singer	Nominated	
Capricho Awards de Gato Nacional	2011	Perry	Best Show	Nominated	
Capricho Awards de Gato Nacional	2011	"Last Friday Night (T.G.I.F.)"	Best Video	Won	
Capricho Awards de Gato Nacional	2012	Perry	International Female Singer	Nominated	
Capricho Awards de Gato Nacional	2012	"Wide Awake"	Best Video	Nominated	
Capricho Awards de Gato Nacional	2013	"Roar"	International Hit	Won	
Capricho Awards de Gato Nacional	2015	Perry	Best Show	Won	
Capricho Awards de Gato Nacional	2015	Perry and the Left Shark	Viral of the Year	Nominated	
Capricho Awards de Gato Nacional	2015	Selfie of Perry, Lady Gaga, and Madonna at the Met Gala 2015	Viral of the Year	Nominated	
Channel V Thailand Music Video Awards
Channel V Thailand Music Video Awards	2009	Perry	Popular International New Artist	Nominated	
Channel V Thailand Music Video Awards	2011	Perry	Popular International Female Artist	Nominated	
Chart Attack
Chart Attack	2010	Teenage Dream	Best International Album	Won	
Chart Attack	2010	"California Gurls" (featuring Snoop Dogg)	Best Song	Nominated	
Clio Awards
Clio Awards	2014	katyperry.com	Music Digital/Social – Websites	Bronze	
Clio Awards	2023	"Did Somebody Say... Katy Perry?" (shared with Just Eat Takeaway)	Sonic/Branding	Silver	
Clio Awards	2023	"Did Somebody Say... Katy Perry?" (shared with Just Eat Takeaway)	Audio/Radio	Bronze	
Clio Awards	2025	The Beauty of Gaps (Note: "Roar" is featured in the commercial video, and Perry is credited as one of the songwriters.)	Music Film/Video Craft – Editing	Bronze	
CMT Music Awards
CMT Music Awards	2015	"Roar" (with Kacey Musgraves)	Performance of the Year	Nominated	
CMT Music Awards	2023	"Where We Started" (with Thomas Rhett)	Collaborative Video of the Year	Nominated	
The Colleagues
The Colleagues	2024	Perry	Champion of Children Award	Won	
Cosmopolitan Ultimate Women of the Year Awards		Perry			
Cosmopolitan Ultimate Women of the Year Awards	2010	Perry	Ultimate International Music Star	Won	
Creative Circle
Creative Circle	2023	"Did Somebody Say... Katy Perry?" (shared with Just Eat Takeaway)	Best Radio (Single)	Silver	
Creative Circle	2023	"Did Somebody Say... Katy Perry?" (shared with Just Eat Takeaway)	Best Use of Adapted Music	Bronze	
Creative Loafing's Best of the Bay
Creative Loafing's Best of the Bay	2011	California Dreams Tour	Best Concert of the Year	Runner-up	
Creative Loafing's Best of the Bay	2025	The Lifetimes Tour	Best Over-the-Top Concert Extravaganza	Won	
Creative Review Awards
Creative Review Awards	2023	"Did Somebody Say... Katy Perry?" (shared with RadicalMedia)	Honorable Mentions – Craft	Honoree	
D&AD Pencil Awards
D&AD Pencil Awards	2022	"Teenage Dream" (Sandy Hook Promise version)	Casting/Street Casting (Note: The entry won a Yellow Pencil award for this category.)	Won	
D&AD Pencil Awards	2022	"Teenage Dream" (Sandy Hook Promise version)	Entertainment/Scripted Short Form (Note: The entry won a Graphite Pencil award for this category.)	Won	
D&AD Pencil Awards	2022	"Teenage Dream" (Sandy Hook Promise version)	Sound Design and Use of Music/Adapted Music (Note: The entry won a Wood Pencil award for this category.)	Won	
D&AD Pencil Awards	2022	"Teenage Dream" (Sandy Hook Promise version)	Entertainment/Use of Talent and Influencers (Note: The entry won a Wood Pencil award for this category.)	Won	
D&AD Pencil Awards	2022	"Teenage Dream" (Sandy Hook Promise version)	Film/Health and Wellbeing	Nominated	
Danish Music Awards
Danish Music Awards	2009	Perry	Foreign Newcomer of the Year	Nominated	
Danish Music Awards	2009	"I Kissed a Girl"	Foreign Hit of the Year	Nominated	
Digital Spy Reader Awards
Digital Spy Reader Awards	2011	"Teenage Dream"	Favorite Number-One Song	Won	
Digital Spy Reader Awards	2013	Perry	Best Female Solo Artist	Won	
Digital Spy Reader Awards	2013	Prism	Best Album	Won	
Digital Spy Reader Awards	2013	"Roar"	Best Song	2nd	
Digital Spy Reader Awards	2014	Perry	Best Female Solo Artist	3rd	
Digital Spy Reader Awards	2015	Super Bowl XLIX halftime show	Best Performance	3rd	
Do Something! Awards
Do Something! Awards	2012	Perry	Best Music Artist	Nominated	
The DVF Awards		Perry			
The DVF Awards	2019	Perry	The Inspiration Award	Won	
Echo Music Prize		Perry			
Echo Music Prize	2011	Perry	International Rock/Pop Female Artist	Nominated	
Echo Music Prize	2014	Perry	International Rock/Pop Female Artist	Nominated	
Electronic Dance Music Awards
Electronic Dance Music Awards	2022	"When I'm Gone" (with Alesso)	Best Collaboration	Won	
Elle Style Awards
Elle Style Awards	2014	Perry	Woman of the Year	Won	
Emmy Awards
Emmy Awards	2015	Super Bowl XLIX halftime show	Outstanding Short-Format Live-Action Entertainment Program	Nominated	
Eska Music Awards
Eska Music Awards	2009	One of the Boys	Best Album	Won	
Eurobest European Advertising Festival
Eurobest European Advertising Festival	2023	"Did Somebody Say... Katy Perry?" (shared with Rob&Alexei)	Creative Awards	Silver	
Eurobest European Advertising Festival	2023	"Did Somebody Say... Katy Perry?" (shared with Rob&Alexei)	Creative Awards	Bronze	
FHM
FHM	2009	Perry	Sexiest Woman in the World	23rd	
FHM	2010	Perry	Sexiest Woman in the World	37th	
FHM	2011	Perry	Sexiest Woman in the World	2nd	
FHM	2012	Perry	Sexiest Woman in the World	6th	
FHM	2013	Perry	Sexiest Woman in the World	16th	
FHM	2014	Perry	Sexiest Woman in the World	12th	
FHM	2015	Perry	Sexiest Woman in the World	25th	
FHM Australia		Perry	Sexiest Woman in the World		
FHM Australia	2011	Perry	Sexiest Woman in the World	Won	
FiFi Awards
FiFi Awards	2014	Killer Queen	Women's Popular Fragrance of the Year	Finalist	
FiFi Awards	2016	Mad Potion	Social Media Campaign of the Year	Finalist	
FiFi Awards	2018	Indi	Women's Consumer Choice Fragrance	Finalist	
FiFi Awards (UK)
FiFi Awards (UK)	2011	Purr	Best New Celebrity Fragrance	Won	
Fuse Top 40	2011	Best Video of the Year	"Last Friday Night (T.G.I.F.)"	Nominated	
Fuse Top 40	2012	Best Video of the Year	"Part of Me"	Nominated	
Fuse Top 40	2013	Best Video of the Year	"Roar"	Won	
Fuse Top 40	2014	Best Video of the Year	"Dark Horse" (featuring Juicy J)	Won	
Fuse Top 40	2016	Best Video of the Year	"Rise"	Nominated	
Fuse Top 40	2017	Best Video of the Year	"Chained to the Rhythm" (featuring Skip Marley)	Nominated	
Gaffa Awards (Denmark)
Gaffa Awards (Denmark)	2010	Perry	International Female Artist of the Year	Nominated	
Gaffa Awards (Denmark)	2013	Perry	International Female Artist of the Year	Won	
Gaffa Awards (Denmark)	2021	Perry	International Solo Artist of the Year	Nominated	
Gaffa Awards (Denmark)	2021	Smile	International Album of the Year	Nominated	
Gaygalan Awards
Gaygalan Awards	2009	"I Kissed a Girl"	International Song of the Year	Won	
Glamour Awards
Glamour Awards	2009	Perry	Newcomer of the Year	Won	
Glamour Awards	2011	Perry	Hair Color Chameleon	Won	
Glass Slipper Awards		Perry			
Glass Slipper Awards	2016	Perry	Best New Exhibitor Booth	Won	
Gracie Awards		Perry			
Gracie Awards	2020	Perry	Gracies Impact Award	Won	
Grammy Awards
Grammy Awards	2009	"I Kissed a Girl"	Best Female Pop Vocal Performance	Nominated	
Grammy Awards	2010	"Hot n Cold"	Best Female Pop Vocal Performance	Nominated	
Grammy Awards	2011	"Teenage Dream"	Best Female Pop Vocal Performance	Nominated	
Grammy Awards	2011	Teenage Dream	Album of the Year	Nominated	
Grammy Awards	2011	Teenage Dream	Best Pop Vocal Album	Nominated	
Grammy Awards	2011	"California Gurls" (featuring Snoop Dogg)	Best Pop Collaboration with Vocals	Nominated	
Grammy Awards	2012	"Firework"	Record of the Year	Nominated	
Grammy Awards	2012	"Firework"	Best Pop Solo Performance	Nominated	
Grammy Awards	2013	"Wide Awake"	Best Pop Solo Performance	Nominated	
Grammy Awards	2014	"Roar"	Best Pop Solo Performance	Nominated	
Grammy Awards	2014	"Roar"	Song of the Year	Nominated	
Grammy Awards	2015	"Dark Horse" (featuring Juicy J)	Best Pop Duo/Group Performance	Nominated	
Grammy Awards	2015	Prism	Best Pop Vocal Album	Nominated	
Grindr Best of the Year Awards
Grindr Best of the Year Awards	2017	Witness: The Tour	Best Concert Performance	Won	
Guinness World Records
Guinness World Records	2010–2022	Perry (Note: Perry has achieved a total of 20 Guinness records as of 2022.)	Various world records	Won	
Hit FM Music Awards
Hit FM Music Awards	2009	Perry	Best Breakthrough Artist	Won	
Hit FM Music Awards	2009	Perry	Best Female Artist	Nominated	
Hit FM Music Awards	2009	Perry	Best New Artist	Nominated	
Hit FM Music Awards	2009	"Hot n Cold"	Top 10 International Songs of the Year	Won	
Hit FM Music Awards	2009	"I Kissed a Girl"	Top 10 International Songs of the Year	Nominated	
Hit FM Music Awards	2011	"California Gurls" (featuring Snoop Dogg)	Top 10 International Songs of the Year	Won	
Hit FM Music Awards	2011	"Teenage Dream"	Top 10 International Songs of the Year	Won	
Hit FM Music Awards	2012	Perry	Entertainer of the Year	Won	
Hit FM Music Awards	2012	"Last Friday Night (T.G.I.F.)"	Top 10 International Songs of the Year	Won	
Hit FM Music Awards	2012	"E.T." (featuring Kanye West)	Top 10 International Songs of the Year	Won	
Hollywood Music Video Awards (HMVAs)	2026	"Bandaids"	Best Comedy	Nominated	
Human Rights Campaign Gala
Human Rights Campaign Gala	2017	Perry	National Equality Award	Won	
Hungarian Music Awards	2009	One of the Boys	International Modern Pop Rock Album of the Year	Nominated	
iHeartRadio Music Awards
iHeartRadio Music Awards	2014	Perry	Artist of the Year	Nominated	
iHeartRadio Music Awards	2014	KatyCats	Best Fan Army	Nominated	
iHeartRadio Music Awards	2015	"Dark Horse" (featuring Juicy J)	Best Collaboration	Nominated	
iHeartRadio Music Awards	2016	Perry and the Left Shark	Most Meme-able Moment	Nominated	
iHeartRadio Music Awards	2017	KatyCats	Best Fan Army	Nominated	
iHeartRadio Music Awards	2018	"Swish Swish" (featuring Nicki Minaj)	Best Music Video	Nominated	
iHeartRadio Music Awards	2018	Nugget (Note: Nugget is Perry's dog.)	Cutest Musician's Pet	Nominated	
iHeartRadio Music Awards	2018	"Bon Appétit" (3lau remix featuring Migos)	Best Remix	Nominated	
iHeartRadio Music Awards	2020	"Con Calma" (remix with Daddy Yankee featuring Snow)	Latin Pop/Urban Song of the Year	Won	
iHeartRadio Music Awards	2020	"Con Calma" (remix with Daddy Yankee featuring Snow)	Best Remix	Nominated	
iHeartRadio Music Awards	2023	Play	Favorite Residency	Nominated	
Inavation Awards	2023	Play	Live Event	Won	
Inc.
Inc.	2024	Perry	Female Founders Award	Won	
International Dance Music Awards	2009	"I Kissed a Girl"	Best Alternative/Rock Dance Track	Nominated	
International Dance Music Awards	2009	"I Kissed a Girl"	Best Pop Dance Track	Nominated	
International Dance Music Awards	2010	Perry	Best Artist (Solo)	Nominated	
International Dance Music Awards	2011	Perry	Best Artist (Solo)	Nominated	
International Dance Music Awards	2011	"Firework"	Best Pop Dance Track	Nominated	
International Dance Music Awards	2011	"Firework"	Best Music Video	Nominated	
International Dance Music Awards	2012	Perry	Best Artist (Solo)	Nominated	
International Dance Music Awards	2012	"E.T." (featuring Kanye West)	Best Music Video	Nominated	
International Dance Music Awards	2013	"Wide Awake"	Best Commercial/Pop Dance Track	Nominated	
International Dance Music Awards	2014	"Roar"	Best Commercial/Pop Dance Track	Nominated	
IRMA Number One Awards
IRMA Number One Awards	2008	"I Kissed a Girl"	Number-One Single	Won	
IRMA Number One Awards	2010	Teenage Dream	Number-One Album	Won	
IRMA Number One Awards	2010	"California Gurls" (featuring Snoop Dogg)	Number-One Single	Won	
IRMA Number One Awards	2010	"Teenage Dream"	Number-One Single	Won	
IRMA Number One Awards	2013	Prism	Number-One Album	Won	
IRMA Number One Awards	2013	"Roar"	Number-One Single	Won	
iVillage Entertainment Awards
iVillage Entertainment Awards	2011	Perry	Celeb Whose Wild Style We Can't Get Enough of	Won	
iVillage Entertainment Awards	2012	Last Friday Night (T.G.I.F.)	Music Video You Couldn't Stop Watching	Won	
IWSC Awards
IWSC Awards	2023	De Soi Purple Lune Aperitif	Spirit Award	Bronze	
IWSC Awards	2023	De Soi Champignon Dreams Aperitif	Spirit Award	Bronze	
J-14 Teen Icon Awards
J-14 Teen Icon Awards	2010	Perry	Iconic Singer	Nominated	
J-14 Teen Icon Awards	2010	"California Gurls" (featuring Snoop Dogg)	Iconic Song	Nominated	
J-14 Teen Icon Awards	2010	Perry	Iconic Tweeter	Nominated	
J-14 Teen Icon Awards	2011	Perry	Iconic Trendsetter	Nominated	
J-14 Teen Icon Awards	2011	"Firework"	Iconic Song	Nominated	
J-14 Teen Icon Awards	2012	Niall Horan and Perry at the 2012 VMAs	Iconic Kiss	Nominated	
J-14 Teen Icon Awards	2012	Perry	Iconic Singer	Nominated	
J-14 Teen Icon Awards	2013	Perry	Iconic Female Singer	Nominated	
J-14 Teen Icon Awards	2013	"Roar"	Iconic Song	Won	
J-14 Teen Icon Awards	2013	Perry and John Mayer	Iconic Couple	Nominated	
JIM Awards
JIM Awards	2014	Perry	Best Female – International	Nominated	
JIM Awards	2014	Perry	Best Dressed Female	Nominated	
Juice TV Awards
Juice TV Awards	2011	"Last Friday Night (T.G.I.F.)"	Video of the Year	Won	
Juice TV Awards	2011	Perry	Hottest Female	Won	
Juno Awards	2011				
Juno Awards	2011	Teenage Dream	International Album of the Year	Won	
Juno Awards	2015	Prism	International Album of the Year	Nominated	
Just Drinks Awards
Just Drinks Awards	2022	De Soi	Product Launches	Won	
Las Culturistas Culture Awards	2022				
Las Culturistas Culture Awards	2022	"Thinking of You" (live at MTV Unplugged)	Best Moment Award	Won	
Las Culturistas Culture Awards	2023	Prism	Album of the Year	Nominated	
Latin Music Italian Awards
Latin Music Italian Awards	2014	Perry	Best International Female Artist or Group of the Year	Nominated	
Latin Music Italian Awards	2014	"Dark Horse" (featuring Juicy J)	Best International Song of the Year	Nominated	
Latin Music Italian Awards	2014	"Dark Horse" (featuring Juicy J)	Best International Female Video of the Year	Nominated	
Latin Music Italian Awards	2019	"Con Calma" (remix with Daddy Yankee featuring Snow)	Best Latin Remix	Won	
The Lockdown Awards
The Lockdown Awards	2020	Tomorrowland: Around the World	Mind = Blown, Favorite Use of Technology	Won	
Los 40 Music Awards
Los 40 Music Awards	2011	Perry	Best International Artist	Nominated	
Los 40 Music Awards	2014	Prism	Best International Album	Nominated	
Los 40 Music Awards	2014	"Dark Horse" (featuring Juicy J)	Best International Video	Nominated	
Los 40 Music Awards	2017	"Chained to the Rhythm" (featuring Skip Marley)	International Video of the Year	Nominated	
Los Premios 40 Principales América	2012	Perry	Best International Pop Artist	Nominated	
Los Premios MTV Latinoamérica		Perry			
Los Premios MTV Latinoamérica	2008	Perry	Best New Artist – International	Nominated	
Los Premios MTV Latinoamérica	2008	Perry	Fashionista – Female	Nominated	
Los Premios MTV Latinoamérica	2008	"I Kissed a Girl"	Song of the Year	Nominated	
Los Premios MTV Latinoamérica	2009	"Hot n Cold"	Best Ringtone	Won	
Los Premios MTV Latinoamérica	2009	Perry	Fashionista – Female	Nominated	
Love Radio Awards
Love Radio Awards	2010	Perry and Russell Brand	Wedding of the Year	Won	
Love Radio Awards	2013	Perry	Best International Performer	Won	
Lovie Awards
Lovie Awards	2023	"Did Somebody Say... Katy Perry?" (shared with DEPT)	Best Influencer Endorsement	Silver	
Lovie Awards	2023	"Did Somebody Say... Katy Perry?" (shared with DEPT)	Best Influencer Endorsement (People's Lovie Winner)	Won	
Magic	2025	Perry	Magic Radio's Idol	Finalist	
Magic	2026	"Firework"	Best Song Ever	Finalist	
Maxim
Maxim	2010	Perry	Maxim Hot 100	Won	
Men's Health		Perry			
Men's Health	2013	Perry	Sexiest Woman of the Year	Won	
Meus Prêmios Nick	2011	Perry	Favorite International Artist	Nominated	
Meus Prêmios Nick	2012	Perry	Favorite International Artist	Nominated	
Meus Prêmios Nick	2013	Perry	Favorite International Artist	Nominated	
Meus Prêmios Nick	2014	Perry	Favorite International Artist	Nominated	
Meus Prêmios Nick	2014	KatyCats	Twitter – Favorite Fanatics	Nominated	
Meus Prêmios Nick	2015	Perry	Favorite International Artist	Nominated	
Meus Prêmios Nick	2017	Perry	Favorite International Artist	Nominated	
Meus Prêmios Nick	2017	Perry	Favorite International Instagram	Nominated	
Meus Prêmios Nick	2017	"Feels" (Calvin Harris featuring Pharrell Williams, Perry, and Big Sean)	Favorite Collaboration	Nominated	
Meus Prêmios Nick	2017	"Chained to the Rhythm" (featuring Skip Marley)	Favorite International Music Video	Nominated	
Meus Prêmios Nick	2017	"Chained to the Rhythm" (featuring Skip Marley)	Favorite International Hit	Nominated	
Meus Prêmios Nick	2019	"Never Really Over"	Favorite International Hit	Nominated	
Meus Prêmios Nick	2019	KatyCats	Fandom of the Year	Nominated	
MP3 Music Awards
MP3 Music Awards	2009	"Waking Up in Vegas"	The Radio/Charts/Downloads Award	Nominated	
MP3 Music Awards	2010	"California Gurls" (featuring Snoop Dogg)	The Music/Industry/Choice Award	Won	
MP3 Music Awards	2012	"Part of Me"	The Indie/Rock/Pop Award	Won	
MP3 Music Awards	2014	"Dark Horse" (featuring Juicy J)	The Radio/Charts/Downloads Award	Nominated	
MTV
MTV	2011	Perry	Artist of the Year	Won	
MTV Australia Awards		Perry			
MTV Australia Awards	2009	Perry	Best Breakthrough	Won	
MTV Europe Music Awards
MTV Europe Music Awards	2008	"I Kissed a Girl"	Most Addictive Track	Nominated	
MTV Europe Music Awards	2008	Perry	Best New Act	Won	
MTV Europe Music Awards	2009	Perry	Best Female	Nominated	
MTV Europe Music Awards	2009	"Waking Up in Vegas"	Best Video	Nominated	
MTV Europe Music Awards	2010	Perry	Best Female	Nominated	
MTV Europe Music Awards	2010	Perry	Best Pop	Nominated	
MTV Europe Music Awards	2010	Perry	Best World Stage Performance	Nominated	
MTV Europe Music Awards	2010	"California Gurls" (featuring Snoop Dogg)	Best Video	Won	
MTV Europe Music Awards	2010	"California Gurls" (featuring Snoop Dogg)	Best Song	Nominated	
MTV Europe Music Awards	2011	Perry	Best Female	Nominated	
MTV Europe Music Awards	2011	Perry	Best Pop	Nominated	
MTV Europe Music Awards	2011	Perry	Best Live Act	Won	
MTV Europe Music Awards	2011	Perry	Best North American Act	Nominated	
MTV Europe Music Awards	2011	"Firework"	Best Song	Nominated	
MTV Europe Music Awards	2012	Perry	Best Female	Nominated	
MTV Europe Music Awards	2012	Perry	Best Pop	Nominated	
MTV Europe Music Awards	2012	KatyCats	Biggest Fans	Nominated	
MTV Europe Music Awards	2012	"Wide Awake"	Best Video	Nominated	
MTV Europe Music Awards	2013	Perry	Best Female	Won	
MTV Europe Music Awards	2013	Perry	Best Pop	Nominated	
MTV Europe Music Awards	2014	Perry	Best Female	Nominated	
MTV Europe Music Awards	2014	Perry	Best Pop	Nominated	
MTV Europe Music Awards	2014	Perry	Best Look	Won	
MTV Europe Music Awards	2014	Perry	Best Live Act	Nominated	
MTV Europe Music Awards	2014	Perry	Best US Act	Nominated	
MTV Europe Music Awards	2014	"Dark Horse" (featuring Juicy J)	Best Song	Nominated	
MTV Europe Music Awards	2014	"Dark Horse" (featuring Juicy J)	Best Video	Won	
MTV Europe Music Awards	2015	Perry	Best Live Act	Nominated	
MTV Europe Music Awards	2015	KatyCats	Biggest Fans	Nominated	
MTV Europe Music Awards	2017	"Bon Appétit" (featuring Migos)	Best Video	Nominated	
MTV Europe Music Awards	2017	KatyCats	Biggest Fans	Nominated	
MTV Europe Music Awards	2020	Perry	Best Pop	Nominated	
MTV Europe Music Awards	2020	Tomorrowland: Around the World	Best Virtual Live	Nominated	
MTV Europe Music Awards	2024	KatyCats	Biggest Fans	Nominated	
MTV Hottest	2013	Perry	Hottest Summer Superstar	Nominated	
MTV Hottest	2014	Perry	Hottest Summer Superstar	Nominated	
MTV Hottest	2015	Perry	Hottest Summer Superstar	Nominated	
MTV Hottest	2017	Perry	Hottest Summer Superstar	Nominated	
MTV Hottest	2019	Perry	Hottest Summer Superstar	Nominated	
MTV Hottest	2020	Perry	Hottest Summer Superstar	Nominated	
MTV Hottest	2021	Perry	Hottest Summer Superstar	Nominated	
MTV Italian Music Awards		Perry			
MTV Italian Music Awards	2009	Perry	Best New Artist	Nominated	
MTV Italian Music Awards	2011	Perry	Best Look	Nominated	
MTV Italian Music Awards	2011	Perry	Too Much Award	Nominated	
MTV Italian Music Awards	2011	Perry	Wonder Woman Award	Nominated	
MTV Italian Music Awards	2012	Perry	Wonder Woman Award	Nominated	
MTV Italian Music Awards	2012	"Last Friday Night (T.G.I.F.)"	Best Video	Nominated	
MTV Italian Music Awards	2014	Perry	Wonder Woman Award	Nominated	
MTV Italian Music Awards	2014	Perry	Artist Saga	Nominated	
MTV Italian Music Awards	2017	Perry	Best International Female	Nominated	
MTV Millennial Awards Brazil
MTV Millennial Awards Brazil	2018	Perry versus Taylor Swift	Shade of the Year	Won	
MTV Millennial Awards Brazil	2018	Nugget	Pet of the Year	Nominated	
MTV Video Music Awards (VMAs)
MTV Video Music Awards (VMAs)	2008	"I Kissed a Girl"	Best Art Direction	Nominated	
MTV Video Music Awards (VMAs)	2008	"I Kissed a Girl"	Best Cinematography	Nominated	
MTV Video Music Awards (VMAs)	2008	"I Kissed a Girl"	Best Editing	Nominated	
MTV Video Music Awards (VMAs)	2008	"I Kissed a Girl"	Best New Artist	Nominated	
MTV Video Music Awards (VMAs)	2008	"I Kissed a Girl"	Best Female Video	Nominated	
MTV Video Music Awards (VMAs)	2009	"Hot n Cold"	Best Female Video	Nominated	
MTV Video Music Awards (VMAs)	2010	"California Gurls" (featuring Snoop Dogg)	Best Female Video	Nominated	
MTV Video Music Awards (VMAs)	2010	"California Gurls" (featuring Snoop Dogg)	Best Pop Video	Nominated	
MTV Video Music Awards (VMAs)	2011	"Teenage Dream"	Best Cinematography	Nominated	
MTV Video Music Awards (VMAs)	2011	Firework"	Video of the Year	Won	
MTV Video Music Awards (VMAs)	2011	Firework"	Best Female Video	Nominated	
MTV Video Music Awards (VMAs)	2011	Firework"	Best Video with a Message	Nominated	
MTV Video Music Awards (VMAs)	2011	"E.T." (featuring Kanye West)	Best Collaboration	Won	
MTV Video Music Awards (VMAs)	2011	"E.T." (featuring Kanye West)	Best Art Direction	Nominated	
MTV Video Music Awards (VMAs)	2011	"E.T." (featuring Kanye West)	Best Direction	Nominated	
MTV Video Music Awards (VMAs)	2011	"E.T." (featuring Kanye West)	Best Editing	Nominated	
MTV Video Music Awards (VMAs)	2011	"E.T." (featuring Kanye West)	Best Visual Effects	Won	
MTV Video Music Awards (VMAs)	2011	"Last Friday Night (T.G.I.F.)"	Best Pop Video	Nominated	
MTV Video Music Awards (VMAs)	2012	"Wide Awake"	Video of the Year	Nominated	
MTV Video Music Awards (VMAs)	2012	"Wide Awake"	Best Visual Effects	Nominated	
MTV Video Music Awards (VMAs)	2012	"Wide Awake"	Best Art Direction	Won	
MTV Video Music Awards (VMAs)	2012	"Part of Me"	Best Female Video	Nominated	
MTV Video Music Awards (VMAs)	2014	"Dark Horse" (featuring Juicy J)	Best Female Video	Won	
MTV Video Music Awards (VMAs)	2014	"Dark Horse" (featuring Juicy J)	Best Collaboration	Nominated	
MTV Video Music Awards (VMAs)	2014	"Birthday"	Best Lyric Video	Nominated	
MTV Video Music Awards (VMAs)	2017	"Chained to the Rhythm" (featuring Skip Marley)	Best Pop Video	Nominated	
MTV Video Music Awards (VMAs)	2017	"Chained to the Rhythm" (featuring Skip Marley)	Best Direction	Nominated	
MTV Video Music Awards (VMAs)	2017	"Chained to the Rhythm" (featuring Skip Marley)	Best Visual Effects	Nominated	
MTV Video Music Awards (VMAs)	2017	"Feels" (Calvin Harris featuring Pharrell Williams, Perry, and Big Sean)	Best Collaboration	Nominated	
MTV Video Music Awards (VMAs)	2017	"Bon Appétit" (featuring Migos)	Best Art Direction	Nominated	
MTV Video Music Awards (VMAs)	2020	"Harleys in Hawaii"	Best Cinematography	Nominated	
MTV Video Music Awards (VMAs)	2024	Perry	Michael Jackson Video Vanguard Award	Won	
MTV Video Music Awards (VMAs)	2024	"Roar" (live at the 2013 MTV Video Music Awards)	VMAs Most Iconic Performance	Won	
MTV Video Music Awards Japan (VMAJ)
MTV Video Music Awards Japan (VMAJ)	2009	Perry	Best New Artist	Nominated	
MTV Video Music Awards Japan (VMAJ)	2009	"I Kissed a Girl"	Best Pop Video	Won	
MTV Video Music Awards Japan (VMAJ)	2011	"California Gurls" (featuring Snoop Dogg)	Best Collaboration	Nominated	
MTV Video Music Awards Japan (VMAJ)	2011	"California Gurls" (featuring Snoop Dogg)	Best Pop Video	Nominated	
MTV Video Music Awards Japan (VMAJ)	2011	"California Gurls" (featuring Snoop Dogg)	Best Video of the Year	Nominated	
MTV Video Music Awards Japan (VMAJ)	2014	"Roar"	Best Video of the Year	Nominated	
MTV Video Music Awards Japan (VMAJ)	2014	"Roar"	Best Female Video	Nominated	
MTV Video Music Awards Japan (VMAJ)	2017	"Bon Appétit" (featuring Migos)	Best International Female Video	Won	
MTV Video Music Brazil (VMB)	2008	Perry	Best International Artist	Nominated	
MTV Video Music Brazil (VMB)	2009	Perry	Best International Artist	Nominated	
MTV Video Music Brazil (VMB)	2010	Perry	Best International Artist	Nominated	
MTV Video Music Brazil (VMB)	2011	Perry	Best International Artist	Nominated	
MTV Video Music Brazil (VMB)	2012	Perry	Best International Artist	Nominated	
MTV Video Play Awards
MTV Video Play Awards	2009	"I Kissed a Girl"	Most Played Music Videos of the Year	Double Platinum	
MTV Video Play Awards	2010	"California Gurls" (featuring Snoop Dogg)	Most Played Music Videos of the Year	Platinum	
MTV Video Play Awards	2010	"Teenage Dream"	Most Played Music Videos of the Year	Platinum	
MTV Video Play Awards	2011	"Last Friday Night (T.G.I.F.)"	Most Played Music Videos of the Year	Double Platinum	
MTV Video Play Awards	2011	"Firework"	Most Played Music Videos of the Year	Platinum	
MTV Video Play Awards	2011	"E.T." (featuring Kanye West)	Most Played Music Videos of the Year	Platinum	
MTV Video Play Awards	2012	"Part of Me"	Most Played Music Videos of the Year	Platinum	
MTV Video Play Awards	2012	"Wide Awake"	Most Played Music Videos of the Year	Platinum	
MTV Video Play Awards	2014	"Dark Horse" (featuring Juicy J)	Most Played Music Videos of the Year	Won	
MTV Video Play Awards	2017	"Chained to the Rhythm" (featuring Skip Marley)	Most Played Music Videos of the Year	Won	
MTV Video Play Awards	2017	"Feels" (Calvin Harris featuring Pharrell Williams, Perry, and Big Sean)	Most Played Music Videos of the Year	Won	
Much Music Video Awards
Much Music Video Awards	2009	"I Kissed a Girl"	UR Fave: International Artist	Nominated	
Much Music Video Awards	2009	"Hot n Cold"	International Video of the Year – Artist	Nominated	
Much Music Video Awards	2010	"Waking Up In Vegas"	International Video of the Year – Artist	Nominated	
Much Music Video Awards	2010	"Starstrukk" (with 3OH!3)	International Video of the Year – Group	Nominated	
Much Music Video Awards	2011	"E.T." (featuring Kanye West)	International Video of the Year – Artist	Nominated	
Much Music Video Awards	2011	"California Gurls" (featuring Snoop Dogg)	Most Watched Video of the Year	Nominated	
Much Music Video Awards	2011	"Teenage Dream"	Most Watched Video of the Year	Nominated	
Much Music Video Awards	2012	"Last Friday Night (T.G.I.F.)"	International Video of the Year – Artist	Won	
Much Music Video Awards	2012	Perry	UR Fave: International Artist or Group	Won	
Much Music Video Awards	2014	Perry	UR Fave: International Artist or Group	Nominated	
Much Music Video Awards	2014	"Dark Horse" (featuring Juicy J)	International Video of the Year – Artist	Nominated	
MVPA Awards
MVPA Awards	2009	"Waking Up in Vegas"	Video of the Year	Won	
MVPA Awards	2010	"California Gurls" (featuring Snoop Dogg)	Best Pop Video	Won	
MVPA Awards	2012	"The One That Got Away"	Best Hair	Won	
MVPA Awards	2012	"The One That Got Away"	Best Direction of a Female Artist	Nominated	
MVPA Awards	2012	"Last Friday Night (T.G.I.F.)"	Best Pop Video	Nominated	
MVPA Awards	2013	"Wide Awake"	Best Pop Video	Won	
MVPA Awards	2013	"Wide Awake"	Best Direction of a Female Artist	Nominated	
MVPA Awards	2013	"Wide Awake"	Best Hair	Nominated	
Myx Music Awards
Myx Music Awards	2012	"Firework"	Favorite International Video	Won	
Myx Music Awards	2013	"Part of Me"	Favorite International Video	Nominated	
Myx Music Awards	2014	"Roar"	Favorite International Video	Won	
Myx Music Awards	2015	"Dark Horse" (featuring Juicy J)	Favorite International Video	Nominated	
NARM Music Awards
NARM Music Awards	2012	Perry	Artist of the Year	Won	
New Music Awards
New Music Awards	2008	"I Kissed a Girl"	Top40 Single of the Year	Won	
New Music Awards	2009	Perry	Top40 New Artist	Won	
New Music Awards	2010	Perry	Top40 Female Artist of the Year	Won	
New Music Awards	2010	"California Gurls" (featuring Snoop Dogg)	Top40 Single of the Year	Won	
New Music Awards	2013	Perry	Top40 Female Artist of the Year	Won	
New Music Awards	2014	Perry	Top40 Female Artist of the Year	Won	
Nickelodeon Kids' Choice Awards
Nickelodeon Kids' Choice Awards	2009	"I Kissed a Girl"	Favorite Song	Nominated	
Nickelodeon Kids' Choice Awards	2011	Perry	Favorite Female Artist	Won	
Nickelodeon Kids' Choice Awards	2011	"California Gurls" (featuring Snoop Dogg)	Favorite Song	Nominated	
Nickelodeon Kids' Choice Awards	2012	"Firework"	Favorite Song	Nominated	
Nickelodeon Kids' Choice Awards	2012	The Smurfs	Favorite Voice from an Animated Movie	Won	
Nickelodeon Kids' Choice Awards	2012	Perry	Favorite Female Artist	Nominated	
Nickelodeon Kids' Choice Awards	2013	Perry	Favorite Female Artist	Won	
Nickelodeon Kids' Choice Awards	2014	The Smurfs 2	Favorite Voice from an Animated Movie	Nominated	
Nickelodeon Kids' Choice Awards	2014	"Roar"	Favorite Song	Nominated	
Nickelodeon Kids' Choice Awards	2014	Perry	Favorite Female Artist	Nominated	
Nickelodeon Kids' Choice Awards	2015	Perry	Favorite Female Artist	Nominated	
Nickelodeon Kids' Choice Awards	2015	"Dark Horse" (featuring Juicy J)	Favorite Song	Nominated	
Nickelodeon Kids' Choice Awards	2018	"The Backpack Kid"/"Swish Swish" (Note: Perry's live performance of "Swish Swish" on the Saturday Night Live season finale went viral, with much of the attention coming towards teen dancer Russell Horning, dubbed the "Backpack Kid", whose arm-swinging dance move ("the Floss") became widely imitated.)	Favorite Dance Trend	Won	
Nickelodeon Kids' Choice Awards	2018	Perry	Favorite Female Artist	Nominated	
Nickelodeon Kids' Choice Awards	2020	Perry	Favorite Female Artist	Nominated	
Nickelodeon Kids' Choice Awards	2021	Perry	Favorite Female Artist	Nominated	
Nickelodeon Kids' Choice Awards	2025	Perry	Favorite Female Artist	Nominated	
Nickelodeon Abu Dhabi Kids' Choice Awards		Perry			
Nickelodeon Abu Dhabi Kids' Choice Awards	2013	Perry	Favorite International Artist	Won	
Nickelodeon Argentina Kids' Choice Awards		Perry	Favorite International Artist		
Nickelodeon Argentina Kids' Choice Awards	2012	Perry	Favorite International Artist	Nominated	
Nickelodeon Argentina Kids' Choice Awards	2014	Perry	Favorite International Artist	Nominated	
Nickelodeon Australian Kids' Choice Awards
Nickelodeon Australian Kids' Choice Awards	2010	"California Gurls" (featuring Snoop Dogg)	Favorite Song	Won	
Nickelodeon Australian Kids' Choice Awards	2011	Perry	Favorite International Artist	Won	
Nickelodeon Australian Kids' Choice Awards	2015	KatyCats	Aussie/Kiwi's Favourite Fan Army	Nominated	
Nickelodeon Mexico Kids' Choice Awards
Nickelodeon Mexico Kids' Choice Awards	2011	Perry	Favorite International Artist	Nominated	
Nickelodeon Mexico Kids' Choice Awards	2011	"Firework"	Favorite Song	Won	
NME Awards
NME Awards	2011	Perry	Best Pop Acts of All Time	Won	
NME Awards	2012	Perry	Hottest Female	Nominated	
NMPA Songwriting Awards (Note: The NMPA awards songwriters for the RIAA certifications their songs have achieved.)		Perry			
NMPA Songwriting Awards	2008–present	Perry	Gold and Platinum Program Award (Note: Perry has received various certifications, ranging from Gold to Diamond, for 28 songs she has written, according to the National Music Publishers' Association (NMPA) database.)	Won	
Now That's What I Call Music! Awards		Perry			
Now That's What I Call Music! Awards	2018	Perry	Best Now – Female	Nominated	
Now That's What I Call Music! Awards	2018	"Roar"	Song of the Teens	Nominated	
NRJ Music Awards
NRJ Music Awards	2009	One of the Boys	International Album of the Year	Won	
NRJ Music Awards	2009	"I Kissed a Girl"	International Song of the Year	Nominated	
NRJ Music Awards	2009	Perry	International Breakthrough of the Year	Nominated	
NRJ Music Awards	2011	Perry	International Female Artist of the Year	Nominated	
NRJ Music Awards	2011	"California Gurls" (featuring Snoop Dogg)	International Song of the Year	Nominated	
NRJ Music Awards	2011	"California Gurls" (featuring Snoop Dogg)	Video of the Year	Nominated	
NRJ Music Awards	2012	"Last Friday Night (T.G.I.F.)"	Video of the Year	Nominated	
NRJ Music Awards	2012	Perry	International Female Artist of the Year	Nominated	
NRJ Music Awards	2013	"Roar"	International Song of the Year	Won	
NRJ Music Awards	2013	Perry	International Female Artist of the Year	Won	
NRJ Music Awards	2013	Perry	Best Digital Moment	Won	
NRJ Music Awards	2014	Perry	International Female Artist of the Year	Nominated	
NRJ Music Awards	2014	"Dark Horse" (featuring Juicy J)	Video of the Year	Nominated	
NRJ Music Awards	2017	Perry	International Female Artist of the Year	Nominated	
NRJ Music Awards	2017	Calvin Harris featuring Pharrell Williams, Katy Perry, and Big Sean	International Duo/Group of the Year	Nominated	
NRJ Music Awards	2017	"Feels" (Calvin Harris featuring Pharrell Williams, Perry, and Big Sean)	Video of the Year	Nominated	
O Music Awards
O Music Awards	2011	Perry and Rihanna	Favorite Animated GIF	Nominated	
O Music Awards	2011	Perry	Favorite Animated GIF	Nominated	
O Music Awards	2011	Perry	Best Artist with a Camera phone	Nominated	
O Music Awards	2011	"E.T." (featuring Kanye West)	Best Lyric Video	Nominated	
O Music Awards	2012	Fucked Up versus Perry	Most Intense Social Spat	Nominated	
The Official Number One Awards	2012				
The Official Number One Awards	2012	"Part of Me"	Number-One Single	Won	
The Official Number One Awards	2013	"Roar"	Number-One Single	Won	
The Official Number One Awards	2017	"Feels" (Calvin Harris featuring Pharrell Williams, Perry, and Big Sean)	Number-One Single	Won	
The Official Specialist Number One Awards
The Official Specialist Number One Awards	2008	"I Kissed a Girl"	Number One Singles Downloads	Won	
The Official Specialist Number One Awards	2008	"I Kissed a Girl"	Number One Physical Singles	Won	
The Official Specialist Number One Awards	2010	Teenage Dream	Number One Album Downloads	Won	
The Official Specialist Number One Awards	2010	Teenage Dream	Number One Physical Albums	Won	
The Official Specialist Number One Awards	2010	"California Gurls" (featuring Snoop Dogg)	Number One Singles Downloads	Won	
The Official Specialist Number One Awards	2012	"Part of Me"	Number One Singles Downloads	Won	
The Official Specialist Number One Awards	2012	Katy Perry: Part of Me	Number One Music Video	Won	
The Official Specialist Number One Awards	2013	Prism	Number One Album Downloads	Won	
The Official Specialist Number One Awards	2013	Prism	Number One Physical Albums	Won	
The Official Specialist Number One Awards	2013	"Roar"	Number One Singles Downloads	Won	
The Official Specialist Number One Awards	2020	"Daisies"	Number One Physical Singles	Won	
The Official Specialist Number One Awards	2020	"Daisies"	Number One Vinyl Singles	Won	
The Official Specialist Number One Awards	2026	"Bandaids"	Number One Vinyl Singles	Won	
The Official Vodafone Big Top 40 Number One Awards
The Official Vodafone Big Top 40 Number One Awards	2010	"California Gurls" (featuring Snoop Dogg)	Number One Award	Won	
The Official Vodafone Big Top 40 Number One Awards	2010	"California Gurls" (featuring Snoop Dogg)	Number One Award	Won	
The Official Vodafone Big Top 40 Number One Awards	2010	"Teenage Dream"	Number One Award	Won	
The Official Vodafone Big Top 40 Number One Awards	2013	"Roar"	Number One Award	Won	
The Official Vodafone Big Top 40 Number One Awards	2013	"Roar"	Number One Award	Won	
The Official Vodafone Big Top 40 Number One Awards	2013	"Roar"	Number One Award	Won	
The Official Vodafone Big Top 40 Number One Awards	2017	"Feels" (Calvin Harris featuring Pharrell Williams, Perry, and Big Sean)	Number One Award	Won	
The Official Vodafone Big Top 40 Number One Awards	2017	"Feels" (Calvin Harris featuring Pharrell Williams, Perry, and Big Sean)	Number One Award	Won	
OK!	2010	Perry	Sexiest Celeb Body	Won	
OK! Body Awards	2015	Perry	Best Body	Runner-up	
The One Club for Creativity
The One Club for Creativity	2023	"Did Somebody Say... Katy Perry?" (shared with McCann London and RadicalMedia)	Sonic Branding/Branded Audio	Merit	
People's Choice Awards
People's Choice Awards	2009	"I Kissed a Girl"	Favorite Pop Song	Won	
People's Choice Awards	2010	Perry	Favorite Pop Artist	Nominated	
People's Choice Awards	2011	Perry	Favorite Female Artist	Won	
People's Choice Awards	2011	Perry	Favorite Pop Artist	Nominated	
People's Choice Awards	2011	Perry	Favorite Internet Sensation	Won	
People's Choice Awards	2011	"California Gurls" (featuring Snoop Dogg)	Favorite Song	Nominated	
People's Choice Awards	2011	"Teenage Dream"	Favorite Music Video	Nominated	
People's Choice Awards	2012	Perry	Favorite Female Artist	Won	
People's Choice Awards	2012	Perry	Favorite Pop Artist	Nominated	
People's Choice Awards	2012	Perry	Favorite Tour Headliner	Won	
People's Choice Awards	2012	"E.T." (featuring Kanye West)	Favorite Song	Won	
People's Choice Awards	2012	"Last Friday Night (T.G.I.F.)"	Favorite Music Video	Won	
People's Choice Awards	2012	Perry (for How I Met Your Mother)	Favorite TV Guest Star	Won	
People's Choice Awards	2012	The Smurfs	Favorite Animated Movie Voice	Nominated	
People's Choice Awards	2013	Perry	Favorite Female Artist	Won	
People's Choice Awards	2013	Perry	Favorite Pop Artist	Won	
People's Choice Awards	2013	KatyCats	Favorite Music Fan Following	Won	
People's Choice Awards	2013	"Part of Me"	Favorite Music Video	Won	
People's Choice Awards	2014	Perry	Favorite Female Artist	Nominated	
People's Choice Awards	2014	Perry	Favorite Pop Artist	Nominated	
People's Choice Awards	2014	KatyCats	Favorite Music Fan Following	Nominated	
People's Choice Awards	2014	"Roar"	Favorite Song	Won	
People's Choice Awards	2014	"Roar"	Favorite Music Video	Won	
People's Choice Awards	2015	Perry	Favorite Female Artist	Nominated	
People's Choice Awards	2018	Witness: The Tour	Concert Tour of the Year	Nominated	
People's Choice Country Awards	2023	"Where We Started" (with Thomas Rhett)	Music Video of the Year	Nominated	
PETA's Libby Awards	2023				
PETA's Libby Awards	2023	Katy Perry Collections	Favorite Celeb Vegan Brand	Won	
Pitchfork Readers Poll	2010	"Teenage Dream"	Top Chart Pop Song	3rd	
Planeta Awards
Planeta Awards	2011	Perry	Best Artist of the Year	Nominated	
Planeta Awards	2011	"Firework"	Mega Planeta of the Year	Won	
Planeta Awards	2011	"Last Friday Night (T.G.I.F.)"	Best Pop/Rock Song of the Year	Nominated	
Planeta Awards	2013	"Roar"	Best Pop Song of the Year	Nominated	
Planeta Awards	2013	Perry	Best Fan Page on Facebook	Nominated	
Planeta Awards	2014	Perry	Best Fan Page on Facebook	Nominated	
Planeta Awards	2014	"Dark Horse" (featuring Juicy J)	Best Hip-hop/R&B Song of the Year	Won	
Planeta Awards	2017	"Feels" (Calvin Harris featuring Pharrell Williams, Perry, and Big Sean)	Best Hip-hop/R&B Song of the Year	Won	
Planeta Awards	2017	Witness	Best Album of the Year	Nominated	
Planeta Awards	2017	"Chained to the Rhythm" (featuring Skip Marley)	Best Pop Song of the Year	Nominated	
Planeta Awards	2019	"Never Really Over"	Best Pop Song of the Year	Nominated	
Planeta Awards	2019	Perry	Best Artist/Group of the Year	Nominated	
Pollstar Awards
Pollstar Awards	2012	California Dreams Tour	Most Creative Stage Production	Nominated	
Pollstar Awards	2015	Prismatic World Tour	Most Creative Stage Production	Won	
Pollstar Awards	2015	Prismatic World Tour	Major Tour of the Year	Nominated	
Pollstar Awards	2018	Witness: The Tour	Most Creative Stage Production	Nominated	
Pollstar Awards	2018	Witness: The Tour	Pop Tour of the Year	Nominated	
Pollstar Awards	2021	Perry	Pop Touring Artist of the Decade	Nominated	
Pollstar Awards	2023	Play	Residency of the Year	Nominated	
Popjustice Readers' Polls
Popjustice Readers' Polls	2008	Perry	Best New Act	3rd	
Popjustice Readers' Polls	2010	Perry	Best Pop Star Twitter User	4th	
Popjustice Readers' Polls	2010	Perry	Best Comeback	7th	
Popjustice Readers' Polls	2010	Perry	Pop Star with Whom You Would Most Like to Make Love	3rd	
Popjustice Readers' Polls	2010	Perry	The Flood – Female	3rd	
Popjustice Readers' Polls	2010	Teenage Dream	Best Album	6th	
Popjustice Readers' Polls	2010	"Teenage Dream"	Best Single	6th	
Popjustice Readers' Polls	2010	"California Gurls" (featuring Snoop Dogg)	Best Collaboration	5th	
Popjustice Readers' Polls	2011	Perry	Pop Star with Whom You Would Most Like to Make Love	2nd	
Popjustice Readers' Polls	2011	Perry	The End of the World – The Woman	4th	
Popjustice Readers' Polls	2011	"E.T." (featuring Kanye West)	Best Collaboration	9th	
Popjustice Readers' Polls	2011	"Last Friday Night (T.G.I.F.)"	Best Video	Won	
Popjustice Readers' Polls	2012	Perry	Act Most Likely to Save Pop Next Year	9th	
Popjustice Readers' Polls	2012	"Part of Me"	Best Video	8th	
Popjustice Readers' Polls	2013	Perry	Best Comeback	8th	
Popjustice Readers' Polls	2013	Perry	Pop Star with Whom You Would Most Like to Make Love	6th	
Popjustice Readers' Polls	2013	Prism	Best Album	3rd	
Popjustice Readers' Polls	2013	"Roar"	Best Single	3rd	
Popjustice Readers' Polls	2013	"Roar"	Best Video	5th	
Popjustice Readers' Polls	2014	"Dark Horse" (featuring Juicy J)	Sickest Beat of the Year	6th	
Popjustice Readers' Polls	2014	"Dark Horse" (featuring Juicy J)	Best Video	8th	
Popjustice Readers' Polls	2014	Perry	Pop Star with Whom You Would Most Like to Make Love	10th	
Popjustice Readers' Polls	2015	Perry	Act Most Likely to Save Pop Next Year	5th	
Popjustice Readers' Polls	2016	Perry	Act Most Likely to Save Pop Next Year	2nd	
Popjustice Readers' Polls	2016	Perry	Best Use of Social Media by a Pop Star	2nd	
Popjustice Readers' Polls	2019	Perry	Best Comeback	5th	
Premios Juventud		Perry			
Premios Juventud	2014	Perry	Favorite Artist, Not Hispanic	Nominated	
Premios Juventud	2014	"Roar"	Favorite Song, Not in Spanish	Nominated	
Premios Juventud	2014	"Dark Horse" (featuring Juicy J)	Favorite Song, Not in Spanish	Nominated	
Premios Oye!
Premios Oye!	2009	Perry	Best New Artist	Nominated	
Premios Oye!	2012	Teenage Dream	English Album	Nominated	
Premios Oye!	2013	Teenage Dream: The Complete Confection	English Album	Nominated	
Premios Oye!	2013	"Part of Me"	English Song	Nominated	
Premios Tu Música Urbano	2020	"Con Calma" (remix with Daddy Yankee featuring Snow)	Remix of the Year	Nominated	
Premios Viva	2011	Perry	Best Female Artist of the Year	Won	
Premios Viva	2013	Perry	Best Female Artist of the Year	Won	
Premios Viva	2013	Perry	Best Pop Artist of the Year	Nominated	
Premios Viva	2013	Perry	Sexiest Female of the Year	Won	
Premios Viva	2013	"Roar"	Best Video of the Year	Won	
Q Awards
Q Awards	2008	"I Kissed a Girl"	Best Track	Nominated	
Q Awards	2011	"Last Friday Night (T.G.I.F.)"	Best Video	Nominated	
QQ Music
QQ Music	2025	"Roar"	20th Anniversary Top Western Songs	Won	
Queerty Awards		"Roar"			
Queerty Awards	2013	"Roar"	Anthem of the Year	Nominated	
The Radio Academy Awards
The Radio Academy Awards	2011	Perry	Most Played Artist on British Radio	Won	
Radio Disney Music Awards
Radio Disney Music Awards	2013	"Wide Awake"	Best Breakup Song	Nominated	
Radio Disney Music Awards	2014	"Roar"	Song of the Year	Nominated	
Radio Disney Music Awards	2014	Perry	Best Female Artist	Nominated	
Radio Disney Music Awards	2014	KatyCats	Fiercest Fans	Nominated	
Radio Disney Music Awards	2017	Perry	Best Female Artist	Nominated	
The Record of the Year
The Record of the Year	2008	"I Kissed a Girl"	The Record of the Year	Nominated	
The Record of the Year	2010	"California Gurls" (featuring Snoop Dogg)	The Record of the Year	Nominated	
Record Report
Record Report	2011	Perry	Artist of the Year	Finalist	
Record Report	2012	Perry	Artist of the Year	Finalist	
Record Report	2024	Perry	Artist of the Year	Finalist	
Recording Industry Association of America (RIAA)		Perry			
Recording Industry Association of America (RIAA)	2014	Perry	Top Digital Artist	Won	
Recording Industry Association of America (RIAA)	2017	"Firework"	Diamond Song Award	Won	
Recording Industry Association of America (RIAA)	2017	"Roar"	Diamond Song Award	Won	
Recording Industry Association of America (RIAA)	2017	"Dark Horse" (featuring Juicy J)	Diamond Song Award	Won	
Recording Industry Association of America (RIAA)	2019	Perry	100 Million RIAA Certified Songs	Won	
Recording Industry Association of America (RIAA)	2024	Teenage Dream	Diamond Album Award	Won	
Recording Industry Association of America (RIAA)	2024	"California Gurls" (featuring Snoop Dogg)	Diamond Song Award	Won	
Recording Industry Association of America (RIAA)	2024	"Teenage Dream"	Diamond Song Award	Won	
Recording Industry Association of America (RIAA)	2024	"E.T." (featuring Kanye West)	Diamond Song Award	Won	
red! Star Awards
red! Star Awards	2010	Perry	Fashion Icon	Won	
Ritmo Latino Entertainment Awards		Perry			
Ritmo Latino Entertainment Awards	2025	Perry	Crossover Icon Award	Won	
Rockbjörnen		Perry			
Rockbjörnen	2008	Perry	Foreign Artist of the Year	Nominated	
Rockol Awards		Perry			
Rockol Awards	2013	Prism	Best International Album	Won	
Rockol Awards	2013	"Roar"	Best Video	Won	
Rolling Stone Readers' Poll
Rolling Stone Readers' Poll	2011	Perry	The Queen of Pop	7th	
Rolling Stone Spirit Awards
Rolling Stone Spirit Awards	2025	De Soi	Best Non-Alcoholic Canned Cocktail	Won	
RTHK International Pop Poll Awards
RTHK International Pop Poll Awards	2009	"I Kissed a Girl"	Top Ten International Gold Songs	Won	
RTHK International Pop Poll Awards	2011	"California Gurls" (featuring Snoop Dogg)	Top Ten International Gold Songs	Won	
RTHK International Pop Poll Awards	2011	Perry	Top Female Artist	Silver	
RTHK International Pop Poll Awards	2012	"Last Friday Night (T.G.I.F.)"	Top Ten International Gold Songs	Won	
RTHK International Pop Poll Awards	2014	Perry	Top Female Artist	Gold	
RTHK International Pop Poll Awards	2014	"Roar"	Top Ten International Gold Songs	Won	
RTHK International Pop Poll Awards	2014	"Roar"	Super Gold Song	Won	
RTL 102.5 Power Hits Estate	2017	"Bon Appétit"	Power Hit of the Summer	Nominated	
RTL 102.5 Power Hits Estate	2017	"Feels"	Power Hit of the Summer	Nominated	
RTL 102.5 Power Hits Estate	2019	"Never Really Over"	Power Hit of the Summer	Nominated	
RTL 102.5 Power Hits Estate	2020	"Smile"	Power Hit of the Summer	Nominated	
RTL 102.5 Power Hits Estate	2024	"Woman's World"	Power Hit of the Summer	Nominated	
RTL 102.5 Power Hits Estate	2026	"Watch It Burn"	Power Hit of the Summer	Nominated	
San Francisco World Spirits Competition
San Francisco World Spirits Competition	2024	De Soi Très Rosé	SFWSC Medal	Gold	
San Francisco World Spirits Competition	2024	De Soi Spritz Italiano	SFWSC Medal	Silver	
Seed Awards	2024				
Seed Awards	2011	Perry	Best International Artist of the Year	Won	
Seed Awards	2013	Perry	Best International Artist of the Year	Won	
Shorty Awards
Shorty Awards	2022	"Music in Color" (shared with BEHR)	Influencer and Celebrity	Won	
Shorty Awards	2022	"Music in Color" (shared with BEHR)	Creative Use of Technology and Media Partnership	Finalist	
Shots Awards EMEA	2022	"Did Somebody Say... Katy Perry?" (shared with Just Eat Takeaway)	Production and Styling	Gold	
Spark Animation Awards
Spark Animation Awards	2021	"Harleys in Hawaii"	Best Music Video	Honoree	
Spike Guys Choice Awards
Spike Guys Choice Awards	2009	Perry	Sexiest Siren	Won	
Spin Readers' Poll	2009	Perry	Sex Goddess of the Year	Nominated	
Spotify Awards
Spotify Awards	2022	"Dark Horse" (featuring Juicy J)	Billion-Play Award	Won	
Spotify Awards	2023	"Feels" (Calvin Harris featuring Pharrell Williams, Perry, and Big Sean)	Billion-Play Award	Won	
Spotify Awards	2023	"Roar"	Billion-Play Award	Won	
Spotify Awards	2023	"Last Friday Night (T.G.I.F.)"	Billion-Play Award	Won	
Spotify Awards	2024	"Firework"	Billion-Play Award	Won	
Spotify Awards	2024	"The One That Got Away"	Billion-Play Award	Won	
Spotify Awards	2024	"Hot n Cold"	Billion-Play Award	Won	
Spotify Awards	2025	"I Kissed a Girl"	Billion-Play Award	Won	
Spotify Awards	2025	"California Gurls" (featuring Snoop Dogg)	Billion-Play Award	Won	
Spotify Awards	2025	"Teenage Dream"	Billion-Play Award	Won	
StarShine Music Awards	2009	Perry	Artist of the Year	Nominated	
StarShine Music Awards	2009	Perry	Best New Artist	Nominated	
StarShine Music Awards	2009	Perry	Favorite Female Artist	Nominated	
StarShine Music Awards	2009	One of the Boys	Album of the Year	Nominated	
StarShine Music Awards	2009	"Hot n Cold"	Song of the Year	Nominated	
StarShine Music Awards	2009	"Hot n Cold"	Best Pop Song	Won	
StarShine Music Awards	2009	Hello Katy Tour	Best Live Show	Nominated	
Swiss Music Awards
Swiss Music Awards	2009	"I Kissed a Girl"	Best International Song	Nominated	
Taste Awards
Taste Awards	2014	"This Is How We Do"	Outstanding Music Video	Won	
Taste Awards	2018	"Bon Appétit" (featuring Migos)	Song of the Year	Won	
TEC Awards
TEC Awards	2009	"I Kissed a Girl"	Record Production/Single	Nominated	
TEC Awards	2011	"Teenage Dream"	Record Production/Single	Nominated	
TEC Awards	2014	Prismatic World Tour	Tour/Event Sound Production	Nominated	
Teen Choice Awards
Teen Choice Awards	2008	Perry	Choice MySpacer	Nominated	
Teen Choice Awards	2008	"I Kissed a Girl"	Choice Summer Song	Nominated	
Teen Choice Awards	2009	Perry	Choice Music: Female Artist	Nominated	
Teen Choice Awards	2009	"Hot n Cold"	Choice Music: Single by a Female Artist	Nominated	
Teen Choice Awards	2009	One of the Boys	Choice Music: Album by a Female Artist	Nominated	
Teen Choice Awards	2009	Kitty Purry (Note: Kitty Purry was Perry's cat.)	Choice Celebrity Pet	Nominated	
Teen Choice Awards	2010	Perry	Choice Fashion: Female Hottie	Nominated	
Teen Choice Awards	2010	Perry	Choice Fashion: Red Carpet Fashion Icon Female	Nominated	
Teen Choice Awards	2010	"California Gurls" (featuring Snoop Dogg)	Choice Music: Single	Won	
Teen Choice Awards	2010	"California Gurls" (featuring Snoop Dogg)	Choice Summer Song	Won	
Teen Choice Awards	2010	"If We Ever Meet Again" (with Timbaland)	Choice Music: Hook Up	Nominated	
Teen Choice Awards	2011	Perry	Choice Music: Female Artist	Nominated	
Teen Choice Awards	2011	Perry	Choice Summer Female Artist	Won	
Teen Choice Awards	2011	"Firework"	Choice Music: Single	Nominated	
Teen Choice Awards	2011	"Teenage Dream"	Choice Music: Love Song	Nominated	
Teen Choice Awards	2011	"Last Friday Night (T.G.I.F.)"	Choice Summer Song	Nominated	
Teen Choice Awards	2012	Perry	Choice Music: Female Artist	Nominated	
Teen Choice Awards	2012	Perry	Choice Fashion: Female Hottie	Nominated	
Teen Choice Awards	2012	Perry	Choice Summer Female Artist	Nominated	
Teen Choice Awards	2012	Perry	Choice Fashion Icon: Female	Won	
Teen Choice Awards	2012	"Part of Me"	Choice Music: Single by a Female Artist	Nominated	
Teen Choice Awards	2012	"Wide Awake"	Choice Break-Up Song	Nominated	
Teen Choice Awards	2012	The Sims 3: Showtime – Katy Perry	Choice Video Game	Nominated	
Teen Choice Awards	2012	Katy Perry: Part of Me	Choice Summer Movie: Comedy/Music	Won	
Teen Choice Awards	2013	Perry	Twitter Personality	Nominated	
Teen Choice Awards	2014	Perry	Choice Music: Female Artist	Nominated	
Teen Choice Awards	2014	Perry	Choice Web: Social Media Queen	Won	
Teen Choice Awards	2014	Perry	Choice Web: Twit	Nominated	
Teen Choice Awards	2014	"Dark Horse" (featuring Juicy J)	Choice Music: Single by a Female Artist	Nominated	
Teen Choice Awards	2014	Prismatic World Tour	Choice Summer Tour	Nominated	
Teen Choice Awards	2015	Perry	Social Media Queen	Nominated	
Teen Choice Awards	2015	Perry	Choice Twit	Nominated	
Teen Choice Awards	2016	Perry	Choice Twit	Nominated	
Teen Choice Awards	2017	Perry	Choice Music: Female Artist	Nominated	
Teen Choice Awards	2017	Perry	Choice Summer Female Artist	Nominated	
Teen Choice Awards	2019	Perry	Choice Summer Female Artist	Nominated	
Teen Choice Awards	2019	"Never Really Over"	Choice Song: Female Artist	Nominated	
Teen Choice Awards	2019	"365" (with Zedd)	Choice Electronic/Dance Song	Nominated	
Teen Choice Awards	2019	"Con Calma" (remix with Daddy Yankee featuring Snow)	Choice Latin Song	Nominated	
Telehit Awards
Telehit Awards	2010	Teenage Dream	Best International Album	Nominated	
Telehit Awards	2011	Teenage Dream	Best International Album	Won	
Telehit Awards	2011	Perry	Best Artist of the Year	Nominated	
Telehit Awards	2012	"Wide Awake"	Video of the Year	Nominated	
Telehit Awards	2014	Prism	Best Female Pop Album	Won	
Telehit Awards	2014	"Dark Horse" (featuring Juicy J)	Video of the Year	Won	
Telehit Awards	2017	Perry	Female Solo Artist of the Year	Nominated	
Telehit Awards	2017	"Bon Appétit" (featuring Migos)	Video of the Year	Nominated	
Ticketmaster Awards (France)
Ticketmaster Awards (France)	2026	The Lifetimes Tour	International Concert of the Year	Nominated	
Ticketmaster Awards (Ireland)	2026	The Lifetimes Tour			
Ticketmaster Awards (Ireland)	2026	The Lifetimes Tour	Arena Gig of the Year	Nominated	
Ticketmaster Awards (Poland)	2026	The Lifetimes Tour			
Ticketmaster Awards (Poland)	2026	The Lifetimes Tour	Pop/Indie Pop/Dance Concert of the Year	Nominated	
TikTok Buzzword Awards	2022	"California Gurls" (featuring Snoop Dogg)	Trend of the Year	Nominated	
Time Readers' Poll
Time Readers' Poll	2011	Perry	Most Influential People in the World	Finalist	
Time Readers' Poll	2014	Perry	Most Influential People in the World	Finalist	
Top Hit Music Awards		Perry			
Top Hit Music Awards	2019	Perry	Best International Female Artist on YouTube Russia	Won	
Top in Rock Awards		Perry			
Top in Rock Awards	2008	Perry	Top Rock Newcomer	Won	
The Trevor Project		Perry			
The Trevor Project	2012	Perry	Trevor Hero Award	Won	
UK Festival Awards	2009	Perry	Festival Fitty of the Year – Girls	Nominated	
UK Music Video Awards	2017	"Bon Appétit" (featuring Migos)	Best Pop Video – International	Nominated	
UNICEF
UNICEF	2016	Perry	Audrey Hepburn Humanitarian Award	Won	
Universal Music Greater China		Perry			
Universal Music Greater China	2025	Perry	Two Billion On-Demand Streams in China	Won	
Universal Music India Yearly Awards
Universal Music India Yearly Awards	2020	"Daisies"	Song of the Year	Won	
USA Today 10Best Readers' Choice Awards	2023	Play	Best Las Vegas Show	2nd	
V Chart Awards
V Chart Awards	2013	Perry	Top Female Western Artist	Won	
Variety		Perry			
Variety	2021	Perry	Power of Women Award	Won	
Vevo Certified Awards
Vevo Certified Awards	2012–present	Katy Perry official YouTube channel music videos	Vevo Certified Award (Note: Perry has 26 Vevo Certified music videos, each of which is recognized as an award.)	Won	
Vevo Hot This Year Awards
Vevo Hot This Year Awards	2014	"Dark Horse" (featuring Juicy J)	Video of the Year	Won	
Vevo Hot This Year Awards	2014	"Dark Horse" (featuring Juicy J)	Best Pop Video	Won	
Vevo Hot This Year Awards	2014	"Dark Horse" (featuring Juicy J)	Best Certified Video	Won	
Vevo Hot This Year Awards	2014	"Birthday"	Best Lyric Video	Won	
VH1 Awards
VH1 Awards	2011	"Last Friday Night (T.G.I.F.)"	Song of the Summer	Won	
VH1 Awards	2012	"Wide Awake"	Song of the Summer	Won	
Victoria's Secret What Is Sexy Awards
Victoria's Secret What Is Sexy Awards	2010	Perry	Sexiest Songstress	Won	
Virgin Media Music Awards		Perry			
Virgin Media Music Awards	2008	Perry	Best New Act	Nominated	
Virgin Media Music Awards	2008	"I Kissed a Girl"	Best Single	Won	
Virgin Media Music Awards	2010	Perry	Best Solo Female	Nominated	
Virgin Media Music Awards	2010	Perry	Hottest Female	Nominated	
Virgin Media Music Awards	2010	Teenage Dream	Best Album	Nominated	
Virgin Media Music Awards	2010	"California Gurls" (featuring Snoop Dogg)	Best Single	Nominated	
Virgin Media Music Awards	2010	"California Gurls" (featuring Snoop Dogg)	Best Collaboration	Nominated	
Virgin Media Music Awards	2010	"California Gurls" (featuring Snoop Dogg)	Best Video	Nominated	
Virgin Media Music Awards	2011	Perry	Best Solo Female	Nominated	
Virgin Media Music Awards	2011	Perry	Hottest Female	Nominated	
Virgin Media Music Awards	2011	"E.T." (featuring Kanye West)	Best Collaboration	Nominated	
Virgin Media Music Awards	2011	Firework	Best Single	Nominated	
Virgin Media Music Awards	2011	Firework	Best Video	Nominated	
Virgin Media Music Awards	2013	"Wide Awake"	Best Video	Won	
Voice Arts Awards
Voice Arts Awards	2014	One More Thing: Stories and Other Stories (Note: The audiobook was written by B. J. Novak and narrated by himself, as well as by Perry, Rainn Wilson, Jenna Fischer, Jason Schwartzman, Lena Dunham, and Mindy Kaling.)	Outstanding Audiobook Narration – Short Story Anthology	Won	
Webby Awards
Webby Awards	2011	Pieces of Katy	Best Non-profit/Education Campaign	Nominated	
Webby Awards	2011	"Firework" video contest (shared with EMI Music)	Web – Celebrity/Fan	Honoree	
Webby Awards	2012	"E.T." make-up tutorials (shared with EMI Music)	Online Film and Video – How-to, Explainer, and DIY	Honoree	
Webby Awards	2012	Kathy Beth Terry (shared with EMI Music)	Interactive Advertising Online Campaigns	Honoree	
Webby Awards	2013	"Wide Awake" lyric video (shared with Capitol Records)	Online Film and Music Video	Honoree	
Webby Awards	2014	"Roar" lyric video (shared with Capitol Records)	Online Film and Music Video	Honoree	
Webby Awards	2018	"Chained to the Rhythm" (featuring Skip Marley) disco ball campaign	People's Voice Award for Music (Social)	Won	
Webby Awards	2018	Perry's bot (shared with Capitol Records)	Mobile Sites and Apps – Messaging/Bots	Honoree	
Webby Awards	2020	"365" (shared with Zedd and Partizan Entertainment)	Video and Music Video	Honoree	
Webby Awards	2021	"Harleys in Hawaii" (shared with Partizan Entertainment)	People's Voice Award for Video and Music Video	Won	
Webby Awards	2023	"Did Somebody Say... Katy Perry?" (shared with McCann London)	People's Voice Award for Advertising, Media and PR, Best Original Music or Music Supervision	Won	
Webby Awards	2023	"The Walk In" (shared with Amazon Music)	Video – Best Creator, Personality, or Host	Honoree	
Webby Awards	2023	"The Walk In" (shared with Amazon Music)	Video – Reality and Unscripted (Series and Channels)	Honoree	
Weibo Night
Weibo Night	2025	The Lifetimes Tour	Favorite Performance of the Year	Nominated	
Weibo Starlight Awards
Weibo Starlight Awards	2020	Perry	Most Inspiring Person of the Year	Won	
Weibo Starlight Awards	2021	Perry	Most Engaging Artist of the Year	Won	
World Music Awards		Perry			
World Music Awards	2008	Perry	World Best Pop/Rock Female Artist	Nominated	
World Music Awards	2008	Perry	World Best New Artist	Nominated	
World Music Awards	2014	Perry	Special Achievement Award	Won	
WorldFest-Houston International Film Festival
WorldFest-Houston International Film Festival	2019	"365" (shared with Zedd and Warren Fu)	Grand Remi Award for Best Music Video	Won	
WOWIE Awards
WOWIE Awards	2024	Perry and Allison Williams	Best Besties (The BFFs 4ever Award)	Nominated	
WWD's Beauty Inc Awards
WWD's Beauty Inc Awards	2016	CoverGirl Katy Kat Collection	Product of the Year – Mass	Won	
YouTube Creator Awards
YouTube Creator Awards	2012	Perry	Gold Creator Award	Won	
YouTube Creator Awards	2014	Perry	Diamond Creator Award	Won	
YouTube Music Awards		Perry			
YouTube Music Awards	2013	Perry	Artist of the Year	Nominated	
YouTube Music Awards	2015	Perry	50 Artists to Watch	Won	
Z Awards		Perry			
Z Awards	2008	Perry	Best New Artist	Nominated	
Z Awards	2010	Teenage Dream	Album of the Year	Won	
Z Awards	2010	Perry	Most On-Demand Artist	Nominated	
Z Awards	2011	"E.T." (featuring Kanye West)	Collaboration of the Year	Nominated	
Žebřík Music Awards
Žebřík Music Awards	2008	Perry	International – Discovery of the Year	1st	
Žebřík Music Awards	2008	"I Kissed a Girl"	International – Composition of the Year	2nd	
Žebřík Music Awards	2010	Teenage Dream	International – Female Album of the Year	3rd	
Žebřík Music Awards	2013	Perry	International – Female Singer of the Year	3rd	
Zlatý Otto	2008	Perry	Female Singer	Nominated	

== State and cultural honors ==
Name of country, year given, and name of honor
Country	Year	Honor	Ref.
Australia	2014	Commemorative plaque and customized bicycle for breaking the venue record at Sydney's Allphones Arena during The Prismatic World Tour	
Germany	2025	Customized United Buddy Bears for performing at Berlin's Uber Arena during The Lifetimes Tour	
Mexico	2018	Commemorative plaque for selling out shows at Monterrey's Arena Monterrey during The Prismatic World Tour and Witness: The Tour	
Mexico	2025	Customized handicraft for performing at Monterrey's Arena Monterrey during The Lifetimes Tour	
Mexico	2026	Customized handcrafted shoes for performing at Feria Nacional Potosina in San Luis Potosí	
Saudi Arabia	2026	Cemented handprint of Perry on Riyadh Season's The Wall of Fame	
United States	2014	Painting of Perry created by Mark Ryden for his art exhibition "The Gay Nineties West"	
United States	2015	Cemented handprint of Perry in front of the TCL Chinese Theatre for her pop culture contributions	
United States	2017	Interactive bust sculpture of Perry created by Urs Fischer and titled "Bliss"	
United States	2022	Key to the city of Las Vegas	
United States	2025	March 1 as "Katy Perry Day" in New Orleans	
United States	2025	Key to the city of Oklahoma City	
United States	2025	Commemorative plaque for selling out show at Newark's Prudential Center during The Lifetimes Tour	
United States	2025	Customized "Katy Perryoke" hand-painted microphones and carry cases for performing at Chicago's United Center during The Lifetimes Tour	

== See also ==
- List of Katy Perry records and achievements
