= Fernando Mencherini =

Italian composer

Fernando Mencherini (1949 in Fermignano – 1997 in Cagli) was an Italian composer of chamber works who reached musical prominence before his early death.

== Biography ==
He attended the Conservatory “G. Rossini” in Pesaro, studying electronic music with Walter Branchi. His career as a composer began in 1977 and he soon gained much respect in avant-garde circles. His works have been performed at major contemporary music festivals throughout Europe and in America, by leading musicians including the Arditti Quartet, Fausto Bongelli, Lucia Bova, Francesco Dillon, Claudio Jacomucci, Massimo Mazzoni, Annamaria Morini, Enzo Porta, Ciro Scarponi, Stefano Scodanibbio and the poet Edoardo Sanguineti.

He was an eclectic musician, refusing to be bound by a single harmonic language, with an amazing ability to renew himself. His scores are worked very finely, but always driven by human impulses expressed with a vital energy and frenetic tension that transmit immediately to the listener.

The Concorso Internazionale di Interpretazione di Musica Contemporanea “Fernando Mencherini” is an international music competition that awards prizes for the performance of the composer's works.

== Selected works ==
- Notturno for double-bass (1979)
- Sei danze (1983) - first performed at the ISCM Festival, Aarhus, 3 November 1983 - Enzo Porta (violin)
- Per limina - first performed at the ISCM Festival, Budapest, 23 March 1986 - Klara Kormendi (pianoforte)
- Crazy jay blue for clarinet (1985) - first performed at the Nuova Consonanza Festival at Palazzo Taverna, Rome, 23 May 1985 - Ciro Scarponi (clarinet)
- Das Zweiter Zimmer (tango) (1983) - first performed at Stockholm, 23 October 1985 - Yvar Mikhashoff (pianoforte)
- Quartetto n. 3 (Passaggio delle ore) - first performed at the Nuova Musica Italiana Festival, Teatro Flaiano, Rome, 7 November 1985 - Quartetto Nuova Cameristica
- Open End (1986) - radio documentary for speaker, strings and live electronics - first performed on Italian radio (Radio Tre) - 19 January 1987
- Ambra & Spunk (1986) - first performed in Avezzano (Auditorium C.S.C.), 30 August 1986 - Federico Mondelci (saxophone)
- Under the moon (1986) - first performed at the Nuove Forme Sonore Festival, Teatro dell’Orologio, Rome 22 August 1986 - Giancarlo Schiaffini (trombone)
- Sonata de La Mescolanza (1987) - first performed at the MANCA Festival (Musiques actuelles Nice Côte-d'Azur), Nice, 19 April 1987- Frances Marie Uitti (cello)
- Giullied (1988) - first performed at the Presencia de Italia en México Festival, Teatro del Fuego Nuevo, Mexico City, 26 March 1990 - Giancarlo Schiaffini (trombone)
- Playtime n.5, La presa del suono (1988) - first performed in Sala A Radio 1, Rome, 12 December 1988 - Anna Maria Morini (flute) Enzo Porta (violin)
- I segreti del tempio (1988) - winner of the Trio Basso Internationaler Kompositions Wettbewerb Prize, Cologne 1989, first performed in Salerno, 17 May 1991 - Trio Italiano Contemporaneo
- Semen for flute (1989) - first performed at the Festival di musica antica Urbino, 22 July - Claudio Rufa
- Caravan Trio (1989) - first performed at the Sala Kursaal, Grottamare, 17 luglio 1991 - Federico Paci (clarinet), Massimo Mazzoni (saxophone), Fausto Bongelli (pianoforte)
- Crazy jay blue (version for double bass)(1990) - first performed at the Tage für neue Musik, Millers Studio, Zurich, 1 December 1990 - Stefano Scodanibbio (double bass)
- Il codice (1990) - first performed at the RomaEuropa Festival, Hungarian Academy, Rome, 13 June 1991 - Corrado Canonici (double bass)
- Divaricanto I (1990) - first performed at the ContemporaneoPiano Festival, Museo Pecci, Prato. 15 March 1992 - Fausto Bongelli (pianoforte)
- La terra è un angelo for 6 voices and pianoforte (1990) - first performed at Progetto Musica ’95, Teatro dell’Acquario, Rome, 20–21 October 1995 - Ensemble Vocale Laboratorio 87, Fausto Bongelli (pianoforte)
- Undo (1991) - first performed at Ferentino, December 1991 - Giulio Tampalini (guitar)
- Divaricanto II for nine instruments (1991) - first performed at the Rassegna Internazionale Musica Contemporanea, Teatro Ghione, Rome, 17 June 1991 - Frusinate Ensemble
- Divaricanto III for saxophone and pianoforte (1992) - first performed at the World Saxophone Congress, Teatro Rossini, Pesaro, 3 September 1992 - Massimo Mazzoni, Fausto Bongelli
- Survival bag for harp (1992) - first performed at the X Rassegna di nuova musica, Macerata, 8 luglio 1992 - Lucia Bova
- Vortex for flute, violin, 11 strings and vibraphone (1992) - first performed at the Nuova musica italiana Festival, Auditorium Radio 1, Rome - Anna Maria Morini (flute), Enzo Porta (pianoforte), I Virtuosi dell’Accademia Ensemble
- How was it there? for brass, strings and percussion (1992) - first performed at Traiettorie, Teatro Regio, Parma, 25 April 1993 - Ensemble Edgard Varèse
- Tutti i cappotti for orchestra (1993) - first performed at L’Aquila / Rome, Auditorium RAI, 9–11 October 1993 - Orchestra Sinfonica Abruzzese
- Gli automi spirituali for 4 clarinets (1994) - first performed at Sonopolis, Teatro A l’Avogaria, Venice, 4 April 1995 - Claravoce Quartetto
- Sexy Sadie (1995), a flash opera for soprano, speaker, five instruments and percussion (1995) - first performed at Europa Festival ’95, Ferentino, 17 July 1995 - Barbara Lazotti, Marco Piccioni, Logos Ensemble
- Viaggio intorno alla terra for 6 voices and pianoforte (1995) - first performed at Auditorium S. Arcangelo, Fano, 25 August 1995 - Ensemble Vocale Laboratorio 87, Fausto Bongelli
- Ah, il mio sonno for six voices (1996), text by Edoardo Sanguineti - first performed at the XIV Rassegna di Nuova Musica, Teatro Lauro Rossi, Macerata, 18 May 1996 - Ensemble Vocale Laboratorio 87
- Ricinulei for accordion (1996) - first performed at the III Seminario de Acordeón, San Sebastián, 26 July 1996 - Claudio Jacomucci
- Ritorna mia luna for 3 voices and saxophone (1996) - text by Edoardo Sanguineti - first performed at the Palazzo Civico, Cagliari, 21 September 1996 - Ensemble Vocale Laboratorio 87, Massimo Mazzoni
- Abuse of power comes as no surprise for pianoforte (1997) - first performed at the XVI Rassegna di Nuova Musica, Teatro Lauro Rossi, Macerata, 29 May 1998 - Fausto Bongelli
- Canzone periferica for flute and cello (1997) - first performed at Florence Conservatory, 17 March 1997 - Mario Caroli, Francesco Dillon
- Quartetto IV for strings (1997) - first performed at Lodi, 12 June 1997 - Quartetto Ogi (Prometeo)
- La huella for two accordions (1997) - first performance Festival Ceresio Estate, Lugano, 29 June 1997 - Duo Accoland (Claudio Jacomucci, Anne Landa)

== Bibliography ==
- Wilheim Andras, Festival ISCM a Budapest, in "Piano Time", no.39, June 1986
- Renzo Cresti, Mencherini Gottardo Giglioli, in "Piano Time" nos. 52-53, July–August 1987
- Renzo Cresti, Verso il duemila, Napoli – Pisa, Dick Peerson Edizioni, 1990
- Renzo Cresti, Fernando Mencherini, scriba del caos, in "Il Pasquino Musicale", December 1991
- Renzo Cresti, Introduzione a Autoanalisi dei compositori italiani, Napoli, Flavio Pagano Editore, 1992
- Renzo Cresti, Fernando Mencherini. Geografia di gesti, in "Musica Attuale", no.6, 1994
- Paolo Maurizi, Incontro con Fernando Mencherini, in "Sonus", no.12, January–April 1994
- Renzo Cresti, Fernando Mencherini. Geografia di gesti, in "Musica Attuale", no.6, 1994
- Paolo Maurizi, Incontro con Fernando Mencherini, in "Sonus", no.12, January–April 1994
- Anna Maria Morini, Fernando Mencherini, in "Syrinx", no.34, October–December 1997

== Discography ==
- Sei danze for violin - Enzo Porta (PRC S20-30 EDIPAN 1986)
- Crazy jay blue for clarinet - Ciro Scarponi (PRC S20-31 EDIPAN 1986)
- Notturno for double bass - Stefano Scodanibbio (PRC S20-35 EDIPAN 1987)
- Playtime IV for two saxophones - Mondelci and Mazzoni (PRC S20-52 EDIPAN 1987)
- Playtime V for flute and violin - Morini and Porta (CDC 3008 EDIPAN 1990)
- Giullied for trombone - Giancarlo Schiaffini (CCD 3003 BMG Ariola 1991)
- L’Arcogaio for violin - Enzo Porta (CONTEDISC208 CD1 CONTEMPO RECORDS 1991)
- Fernando Mencherini- Un giardino a mente vuota for harp, wind and percussion; Semen for flute; Caravan Trio for clarinet, saxophone and pianoforte; Le zattere for violin and pianoforte; Divaricanto 3° for saxophone and pianoforte; Rami del re for 15 instruments - (CD PAN 3037 EDIPAN 1994)
- Piangere la pietra for saxophone and speaker - Massimo Mazzoni and Edoardo Sanguineti (CD 080 BEATRECORDS 1999)
- Fernando Mencherini - Playtime - Notturno volgare for clarinet; Playtime n.1 Alex in Mongolia for two guitars; Rite in progress for pianoforte; Notturno for double bass; Playtime n.4 Dietro l’orologio for soprano and tenor saxophones; Sei danze for violin - (LC 07989 COL LEGNO 2002)
- Bongelli plays Mencherini - Sei danze armoniche; La huella; Rite in progress; Abuse of power comes as no surprise; Canzone periferica - Fausto Bongelli - (VDM038-016 VDM Records 2011)
