= MuchMusic Video Award for Peoples Choice: Favourite International Video =

The award for People's Choice: Favorite International Video is an award presented at the MuchMusic Video Awards. Formerly there were separate award categories for international groups and artists, Peoples Choice: Favourite International Group and Peoples Choice: Favourite International Artist. Those award categories are now defunct due to the "People's Choice: Favourite International Video" which includes international groups as well as international solo artists. The award can only be presented to an artist or group that did not originate from Canada. The results are decided by an online poll. The award was first handed out at the 2008 MuchMusic Video Awards to Fall Out Boy's "The Take Over, The Break's Over" music video.

== Winners ==
Year	Artist	Video
1997	Beck	"Devil's Haircut"
1998	Will Smith	"Gettin' Jiggy Wit It"
1999	Britney Spears	"...Baby One More Time"
2000	Eminem	"The Real Slim Shady"
2001	Nelly f. St. Luke	"Batter Up"
2002	Shakira	"Whenever, Wherever"
2003	Sean Paul	"Like Glue"
2004	Usher f. Ludacris, Lil' Jon	"Yeah!"
2005	Gwen Stefani	"Rich Girl"
2006	Kelly Clarkson	"Because of You"
2007	Hilary Duff	"With Love"
