= List of Italian music awards =

There are a great number of music competitions that offer prizes for performance and composition in both classical and popular music. Prizes may be monetary, but may also be in the form of less tangible things such as scholarships, recording contract, concert performances, a chance to have one's composition published or performed by an orchestra, etc. Some music festivals—even though there may be a "winner"—offer nothing more than exposure on television. That is important for musicians, but not technically a "prize" and those items are not included on this list. Nor are in-house conservatory prizes included—that is, competitions open only to students of the respective conservatory. This list includes competitions that are, generally speaking, open to "all-comers," although some of them impose age limits or residency (in Italy) requirements. The list, below, divided by area of interest; that is, classical, jazz, opera, instrumental, etc. Most of the competitions listed are annual affairs. Where possible, the competition name is linked to an external site, or an email address is provided where further details should be available.

== Popular music ==
- Italian Music Awards
- Latin Music Italian Awards

== Classical music ==
=== piano ===
- 'International Piano Competition 'Mauro Paolo Monopoli Prize'

Barletta. Puglia International Piano Competition 'Mauro Paolo Monopoli Prize'

- A.M.A. Calabria international piano competition.

Catanzaro

- "Arcangelo Speranza" European piano competition

Taranto, Puglia

- "A. Scriabin" international piano competition

Grosseto, Tuscany

- "Fryderyk Chopin "Young Pianists" competition

Rome

- "Pausilypon" piano competition

Naples, conservatory.

- International Busoni piano competition

Bolzano

=== violin ===
- Dallas International Violin Competition
- National competition for interpretation of the Mozart violin concerti

Parma

- "A.Curci" international violin competition

Naples

- Ave Maria Prize Award www.avemaria.mono.net - Stresa

=== guitar ===
- Michele Pittaluga International Classical Guitar Competition

Alessandria, Piedmont

- International guitar competition

Nuoro, Sardinia

=== miscellaneous instrumental/voice ===
- Hyperion competition for performance; piano, guitar, strings, voice

Ciampino, Roma

- Val Tidone International Music Competitions

Various disciplines: composition, performance on piano, accordion, chamber music.
Piacenza

- International "City of Barletta Young Musicians" competition

Barletta,

Website 'Città di Barletta' Young Musician Intl. Competition

Sections: piano, strings, guitar, chamber music ensemble, wind instruments.

- International clarinet competition

Bari

- "Gianbattista Viotti" International music competition

performance awards for voice, piano
Vercelli

- Concorso Internazionale di Interpretazione di Musica Contemporanea “Fernando Mencherini”

Cagli (PU)
Prizes for performance of contemporary music by Fernando Mencherini

=== Chamber music ===
- International Carlo Evasio Soliva competition for piano and chamber music

Casale Monferrato

- City of Chieri International Chamber music competition

Chieri, Piedmont

- "Trieste Trio" International competition for chamber music groups with piano.

Trieste

- "Vittorio Gui" international chamber music competition

Florence

- "Paolo Borciani" international string quartet competition

Reggio Emilia

- International chamber music competition

A. Scontrino music conservatory
Trapani

=== Composition ===
- 'Città di Barletta' International Composition Competition

Barletta

Website Città di Barletta Competition

- International Composition Competition in memory of Camillo Togni

Brescia

- "Sandro Fuga" National Competition for Chamber Music Composition

Music conservatory, Torino

- "Valentino Bucchi" Prize: Words and Music for the Peoples' Unity

Rome, International Composition Competition

- "G. Petrassi" International Competition for Composers

Parma

- "Egidio Carella" composition competition

Stradella (PV)

== Vocal ==
- "Ave Maria Price Award" competition for all www.avemaria.mono.net in Stresa :Stresa
- International competition for Verdian voices

Busseto, Parma

- "Tito Schipa" international opera competition for young singers

Lecce

- "Anselmo Colzani" international opera competition

Budrio (Bologna)

- "Adriano Belli" competition for new opera

Spoleto

- "Maria Callas" competition, "New voices for Verdi"

Parma

- International polyphonic competition (for choirs)

Arezzo

== Jazz ==
- International competition for jazz arranging and composition

Barga, (LU)

== Miscellaneous ==
- City of Chieri International music competition

Wind Instruments
Chieri, Piedmont

- MusicDocFest prize for films about music

Rome

- "A. Toscanini" international conducting competition

Parma

- "Antonio Pedrotti" International Conducting Competition

Trento

== See also ==
- World Federation of International Music Competitions
