= Brit Billion Award =

British music award for digital streaming

BRIT Billion Award
- Awarded for: Achievement of over 1 billion digital streams in the UK
- Country: United Kingdom (UK)
- Presented by: British Phonographic Industry (BPI)
- First award: 2023
- Currently held by: Bon Jovi
- Website: brits.co.uk/brit-billion

The BRIT Billion Award is a special award given by the British Phonographic Industry (BPI) to artists who have achieved over one billion digital streams in the United Kingdom. An extension of the BPI's music certification system, the number of streams is verified using data calculated by the Official Charts Company and is the first time in the fifty-year history of the system that an artist's combined success over multiple projects has been recognized as a collective total. The one billion career streams include tracks where the artist is the primary performer, as well as tracks where they appear as a featured artist.

The award was established in 2023 and first presented on May 4, 2023, to thirteen artists. To date, forty-seven recipients, including nineteen non-British artists, have received the BRIT Billion Award. The most recent recipients are Bon Jovi, who were presented with the award in October 2025. At 20 years old, Olivia Rodrigo is the youngest recipient. Whitney Houston and Amy Winehouse are the only solo artists to receive the award posthumously, while ABBA are the only group to receive the award while disbanded; Houston and ABBA were among the inaugural recipients. Ed Sheeran is the first (and only) artist to be awarded the gold version of the award for reaching ten billion streams.

== Creation ==
The award was created to reflect the growing importance of streaming in the UK. In a statement announcing the initial recipients, Sophie Jones, Chief Executive of the BPI said, "for a recording artist, there can be few greater sources of pride than having a Platinum or Gold disc on their wall, but in an era when success in measured in the hundreds of millions and indeed billions of streams, it was clear that we needed a new and additional way to recognise and celebrate outstanding achievement in recorded music, and I feel certain that having a BRIT Billion Award will become equally prized." The trophy itself is manufactured by Gaudio Awards in Tewkesbury, Gloucestershire.

== Recipients ==
Indicates a non-British artist

Date	Image	Recipient	Country of Origin	Ref.
4 May 2023		ABBA	Sweden	
4 May 2023		AJ Tracey	United Kingdom	
4 May 2023		Anne-Marie	United Kingdom	
4 May 2023		Coldplay	United Kingdom	
4 May 2023		Ellie Goulding	United Kingdom	
4 May 2023		George Ezra	United Kingdom	
4 May 2023		Headie One	United Kingdom	
4 May 2023		Mariah Carey	United States	
4 May 2023		Lewis Capaldi	United Kingdom	
4 May 2023		Raye	United Kingdom	
4 May 2023		Rita Ora	United Kingdom	
4 May 2023		Sam Smith	United Kingdom	
4 May 2023		Whitney Houston (posthumously)	United States	
26 May 2023		James Arthur	United Kingdom	
4 June 2023		Years & Years	United Kingdom	
11 June 2023		Becky Hill	United Kingdom	
30 June 2023		Kings of Leon	United States	
5 July 2023		Clean Bandit	United Kingdom	
9 July 2023		Lana Del Rey	United States	
20 July 2023		Queen	United Kingdom	
30 July 2023		Wizkid	Nigeria	
16 August 2023		Olivia Rodrigo	United States	
27 August 2023		Jonas Blue	United Kingdom	
29 August 2023		Billie Eilish	United States	
28 September 2023		Zara Larsson	Sweden	
4 October 2023		Ed Sheeran	United Kingdom	
30 October 2023		The Rolling Stones	United Kingdom	
1 December 2023		Ella Henderson	United Kingdom	
13 December 2023		Joel Corry	United Kingdom	
18 April 2024		Bryson Tiller	United States	
27 April 2024		Jess Glynne	United Kingdom	
1 May 2024		Amy Winehouse (posthumously)	United Kingdom	
16 May 2024		Mabel	United Kingdom	
28 June 2024		The Script	Ireland	
29 June 2024		Green Day	United States	
10 July 2024		Rag'n'Bone Man	United Kingdom	
15 July 2024		Burna Boy	Nigeria	
16 July 2024		Camila Cabello	Cuba/Mexico/United States	
18 July 2024		Eminem	United States	
23 July 2024		Jorja Smith	United Kingdom	
10 August 2024		Chase & Status	United Kingdom	
2 September 2024		blink-182	United States	
27 September 2024		Bring Me the Horizon	United Kingdom	
7 October 2024		James Bay	United Kingdom	
1 November 2024		Pharrell Williams	United States	
5 November 2024		KSI	United Kingdom	
11 May 2025		The Kooks	United Kingdom	
22 May 2025		Tom Grennan	United Kingdom	
5 June 2025		Sigala	United Kingdom	
16 June 2025		Calum Scott	United Kingdom	
14 July 2025		Sam Fender	United Kingdom	
1 October 2025		Take That	United Kingdom	
14 October 2025		Katy Perry	United States	
24 October 2025		Bon Jovi	United States	
