= Jason Wu =

Canadian artist and fashion designer (born 1982)

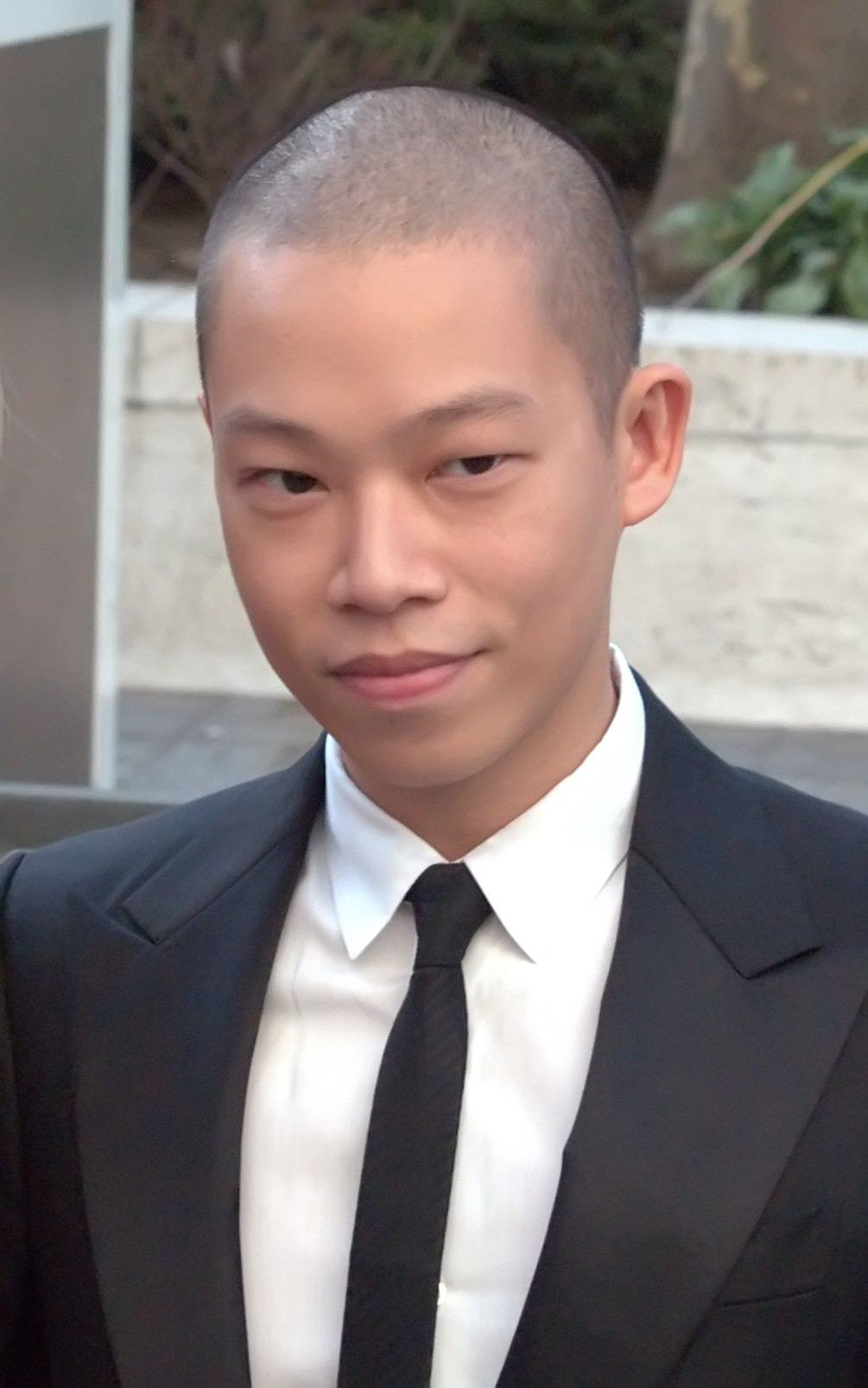
- Wu in 2009
- Born: September 27, 1982 (age 43); Yunlin County, Taiwan
- Citizenship: Taiwan; Canada
- Occupations: Fashion designer; artist
- Labels: Jason Wu Grey, Jason Wu Beauty

Chinese name
- Traditional Chinese: 吳季剛
- Simplified Chinese: 吴季刚
Transcriptions
Standard Mandarin
- Hanyu Pinyin: Wú Jìgāng
- Wade–Giles: Wú Chì-Kāng
Southern Min
- Hokkien POJ: Gô͘ Kùi-Kong

Jason Wu (Chinese: 吳季剛; pinyin: Wú Jìgāng; born September 27, 1982) is a Canadian artist and fashion designer based in New York City.

Born in Taiwan and raised in Vancouver, he studied fashion design at Parsons School of Design, and trained under Narciso Rodriguez before launching his own line. He is known for designing the dresses of Michelle Obama on several occasions, including those worn during the first and second inauguration of American President Barack Obama.

== Early life ==
Wu was born in Yunlin, Taiwan and emigrated to Vancouver, British Columbia, Canada at age nine. He attended Eaglebrook School in Deerfield, Massachusetts and Loomis Chaffee in Windsor, Connecticut and studied abroad with SYA France of School Year Abroad for his senior year of high school. He learned how to sew by designing and sewing for dolls, and went on to study sculpture in Tokyo. At age 16, Wu continued this career path by learning to create freelance doll clothing designs for toy company Integrity Toys under the lines "Jason Wu dolls" and later "Fashion Royalty". The following year, he was named creative director of Integrity Toys.

While spending his senior year of high school in Rennes, France before graduating from the Loomis Chaffee School in 2001, Wu decided to become a fashion designer. He then studied at the Parsons The New School for Design, a division of The New School in New York City, but did not graduate.

== Career ==
Wu launched his ready-to-wear line of clothes with earnings from his years of doll designs. His debut fashion collection was launched in 2006. He won the Fashion Group International's Rising Star award in 2008. Jason Wu's dresses were photographed underwater by Howard Schatz for Delta Faucet Company's Brizo branded faucet campaign in 2006. In 2008 he was nominated for the CFDA / Vogue Fashion Fund award. Bruce Weber shot the designer for W magazine's "Summer Camp" portfolio in July 2008.

Wu's early clients included Ivana Trump, January Jones, and Amber Valletta. He also worked extensively with drag queen RuPaul, ultimately designing six RuPaul dolls.

Wu collaborated with Creative Nail Design for his Spring 2011 collection to create a set of four nail polish colours that was launched May 2011.

From 2013 to 2018, Wu served as the art director of German fashion house Hugo Boss overseeing the entire womenswear range.

In 2013, Wu launched his debut diffusion line (a collection designed with a younger target in mind and retailed at a lower price point), Miss Wu, in tandem with luxury retailer Nordstrom. Michelle Obama wore a Miss Wu green shift in 2012 — before it hit the shelves — while on the campaign trail for reelection. Relaunching the line as Grey in 2016, Wu partnered with Pantone to create a custom grey hue.

In 2020, Jason Wu launched an affordable line of clean makeup and skincare products under the label Jason Wu Beauty. By 2024, the brand also signed a licensing and distribution deal with Concept One Accessories for an "aspirational" collection of handbags and small leather goods; it had been handling the production of its bags in-house before.

=== Designing for Michelle Obama ===
Michelle Obama is a noted Jason Wu customer. She was introduced to Wu by André Leon Talley, Vogue Magazine's editor-at-large, who had been advising the then First Family on their appearance. Obama bought four dresses from Wu early in the year, wearing one of them for a segment on Barbara Walters Special shortly before the November 2008 election, prompting many in the media to consider her his "career-launcher". She wore another dress, a custom-designed one-shoulder, floor-length white chiffon gown, at the inaugural balls on the night of President Barack Obama's first term inauguration.

Appearing on the cover of Vogue, Obama once again wore a Wu design, a magenta silk dress. Upon her arrival in London in April 2009 during the First Lady and President Barack Obama's first official European trip, Obama wore a chartreuse silk sheath dress that was designed by Wu; the next day she wore a Wu coat during her visit with the Queen Elizabeth II. On April 2, 2009, Obama paired a "traditional looking" teal Wu dress with a blue-patterned cardigan designed by Junya Watanabe on her visit to the Royal Opera House.

Obama again wore a dress that was designed by Wu, a ruby red velvet and chiffon design, at the 2013 Presidential Inaugural Balls.

=== Designing for Gong Jun ===
Wu designed his first menswear for the Chinese actor Gong Jun to attend the 76th Cannes Film Festival on May 18, 2023. Gong wore a white suit with sophisticated embroideries and a frog (fastening) designed by Wu.

== Other activities ==
In September 2020, Wu made a tie as part of Joe Biden's "Believe in Better" fashion collection, which included collaborations from 18 other fashion designers around the country as part of the Biden's 2020 presidential campaign.

In 2026, Wu helped design “Fashioning Chinese Women: Empire to Modernity”, an exhibition at the Los Angeles County Museum of Art which explores the evolution of Chinese women’s dress across decades of social transformation. He customized the faces, hairstyles and finishes of the exhibition’s original 3D-printed mannequins for about 50 of its more than 70 historic looks.

== Personal life ==
Wu is openly gay. In 2016, he married Gustavo Rangel in Mexico.

== See also ==
- Chinese people in New York City
- LGBT culture in New York City
- List of LGBT people from New York City
- NYC Pride March
- Taiwanese people in New York City
