= Immortal Flame =

2018 song by Katy Perry

"Immortal Flame" is a song by American singer-songwriter Katy Perry. It was released on December 10, 2018. The track is a power ballad she recorded exclusively as an original promotional theme for the free-to-play mobile role-playing game Final Fantasy Brave Exvius. In conjunction with the song's release, Perry partnered with the game's developers to feature her likeness as multiple limited-time, playable characters within the mobile title.

== Background ==
The collaboration between Katy Perry and Square Enix was first announced during the Final Fantasy Brave Exvius Fan Festa 2018 event in Long Beach, California, on December 9, 2018. She made a surprise on-stage appearance at the global fan gathering, which commemorated the second year of service for the mobile game, to introduce "Immortal Flame" to attendees.

The power ballad was created specifically as a promotional theme for the game. Following in the footsteps of Ariana Grande, who had similarly partnered with the title in 2017, Perry's collaboration included the debut of her new song alongside virtual avatars. A promotional music video was released online simultaneously, initially showing real-world footage of Perry and her dog before she transitions into a Final Fantasy-style video game sprite alongside pixel art and gameplay clips.

As part of the cross-promotional campaign, Perry's likeness was integrated directly into Final Fantasy Brave Exvius as a series of limited-time digital characters. Beginning on December 12, 2018, players who participated in a special in-game event could unlock "Popstar Katy," a pixelated avatar wearing a red costume inspired by one of Perry's outfits from her 2017–2018 concert tour, Witness: The Tour. Additional character designs featuring Perry in different attire were made available in subsequent gameplay events.

== Composition ==
"Immortal Flame" is an anthemic pop power ballad. The track was co-written by Perry alongside her frequent collaborators Sarah Hudson and Ferras Alqaisi. Musically, the song features prominent vocals driven by a sweeping backing orchestra, evoking a dramatic quality designed to fit a role-playing video game setting. Lyrically, the track explores the enduring power of deep emotions for a loved one. The song's instrumentation incorporates a core pop chord progression of B–F♯–G♯m–E, indicating it is composed in the key of B major.

== Reception ==
Andrew Penney of TheGamer highlighted the novelty of Perry technically becoming "canon" within the popular role-playing franchise, remarking on the unusual level of commitment required to record a fully original song for a limited-time mobile event.

In a 2021 retrospective on the "Top Ten Bizarre Videogame Music Collabs" for Prima Games, writer Lucas White ranked "Immortal Flame" and its associated campaign at number one. White described the crossover as a "maelstrom of weaponized extra" and praised the "absolutely unabashed, shameless, audacious pomposity" of pairing Perry's larger-than-life pop persona with the dramatic excess commonly found in the Final Fantasy universe.
