= Katy Perry Collections =

Footwear line by Katy Perry

- Type: Private
- Industry: Footwear
- Founded: February 16, 2017; 9 years ago
- Founder: Katy Perry
- Headquarters: Encino, Los Angeles, California, United States
- Website: katyperrycollections.com

Katy Perry Collections is a line of footwear launched by American singer Katy Perry in 2017 in partnership with Global Brands Group. Following Global Brands Group's bankruptcy in 2021, Perry acquired the label and relaunched it in 2022 with themed seasonal drops sold through the brand's website and major retailers.

== History ==
On February 16, 2017, American singer Katy Perry founded the brand when partnering with Global Brands Group (GBG). She wanted to create a brand that reflected her personality while being accessible to a broad audience. Some inspirations for founding it are a Dalmatian dog-print pair of flats that Perry thrifted, as well as her refusal to wear uncomfortable shoes.

Perry acquired the brand assets, including the label, remaining inventory and key team members, and assumed full ownership in 2022 after the holding company filed for bankruptcy in 2021. This made her the sole owner. Perry later relaunched the brand with the Summer/Spring 2022 Collection in the same year. She followed it by launching a collection called the Fall/Winter Part 2.

Under Perry's ownership, the brand operates with outsourced manufacturing while selling through a combination of wholesale partners and direct-to-consumer channels. Distribution has included the company's own website alongside major retailers and marketplaces such as Nordstrom, Macy's, Belk, Zappos and Amazon. During 2022, footwear executive Gene Berkowitz was appointed president as part of the relaunch, and the company highlighted goals that included rebuilding wholesale distribution and expanding use of eco‑friendly materials. Allison Bennett became president in 2024, with a stated focus on expanding wholesale and international business, including growth on broadcast retail HSN and entry into new markets such as Mexico and planned expansion in Asia.
