= Integrity Toys =

Toy company that designs and markets fashion and celebrity dolls

Integrity Toys is a toy company that designs and markets fashion and celebrity dolls and related accessories, with a focus on high-end fashion dolls. Integrity Toys was founded in 1995 by Percy Newsum. Integrity Toys is a privately held company located at 100 Chestnut Springs Road in Chesapeake City, Maryland.

Integrity Toys produces dolls ranging in size from 12 inches to 16 inches tall. From 1995 - 2005 the African-American doll Janay was produced. She had several friends, including: Alysa, Jade, Mila, Giselle, Aria, Sooki and a twin sister named Nakia. She also had three different boyfriends throughout the years, including: Jordan, Tariq and Keith. Their products typically retail from $60 to $250 each, with most of the products retailing in the $130 to $150 range. In the past, they have made toddler dolls for children. Among other outlets, their products have sold at FAO Schwarz and at Holt Renfrew.

Some of their doll brands include Fashion Royalty, Dynamite Girls, and Poppy Parker. Other lines have included Nu.Face, Victoire Roux, Color Infusion, FR:16, Nu.Fantasy, Fashion Teen Poppy, Tulabelle, and Dracula and His Brides. A new line of dolls has been announced that will be based on the television show American Horror Story.

Integrity Toys has partnered with Paramount Pictures and Fox. They also have a partnership with Jason Wu. He has been a doll designer for Integrity Toys since 1998. He was hired by them before the age of 17. Jason Wu made freelance doll clothing for Integrity Toys' doll line "Jason Wu Dolls." He later designed for their Fashion Royalty line.

In 2012, Integrity Toys partnered with Hasbro to create a line of Jem dolls. The dolls debuted at the 2012 San Diego Comic-Con. Marketing Director Alain Tremblay commented, "Jem and the Holograms has been a major influence for us."

The late Vaughn Sawyers, who passed away in 2025, was one of their designers.

A new Poppy Parker collection was presented on the websites of the official dealers of Integrity Toys in 2020.

Collectors' events and clubs exist for Integrity Toys. Collector events have been held since February 14, 2006. Conventions are held annually for Integrity Toys collectors. Carol Roth, television personality and author of "The Entrepreneur Equation," started the W Club in 2005. This online collector's club opens up memberships once each year.

== See also ==
- Barbie
- Sindy
- Lammily - a crowd funded alternative developed by Nickolay Lamm
