= Kim Petras discography =

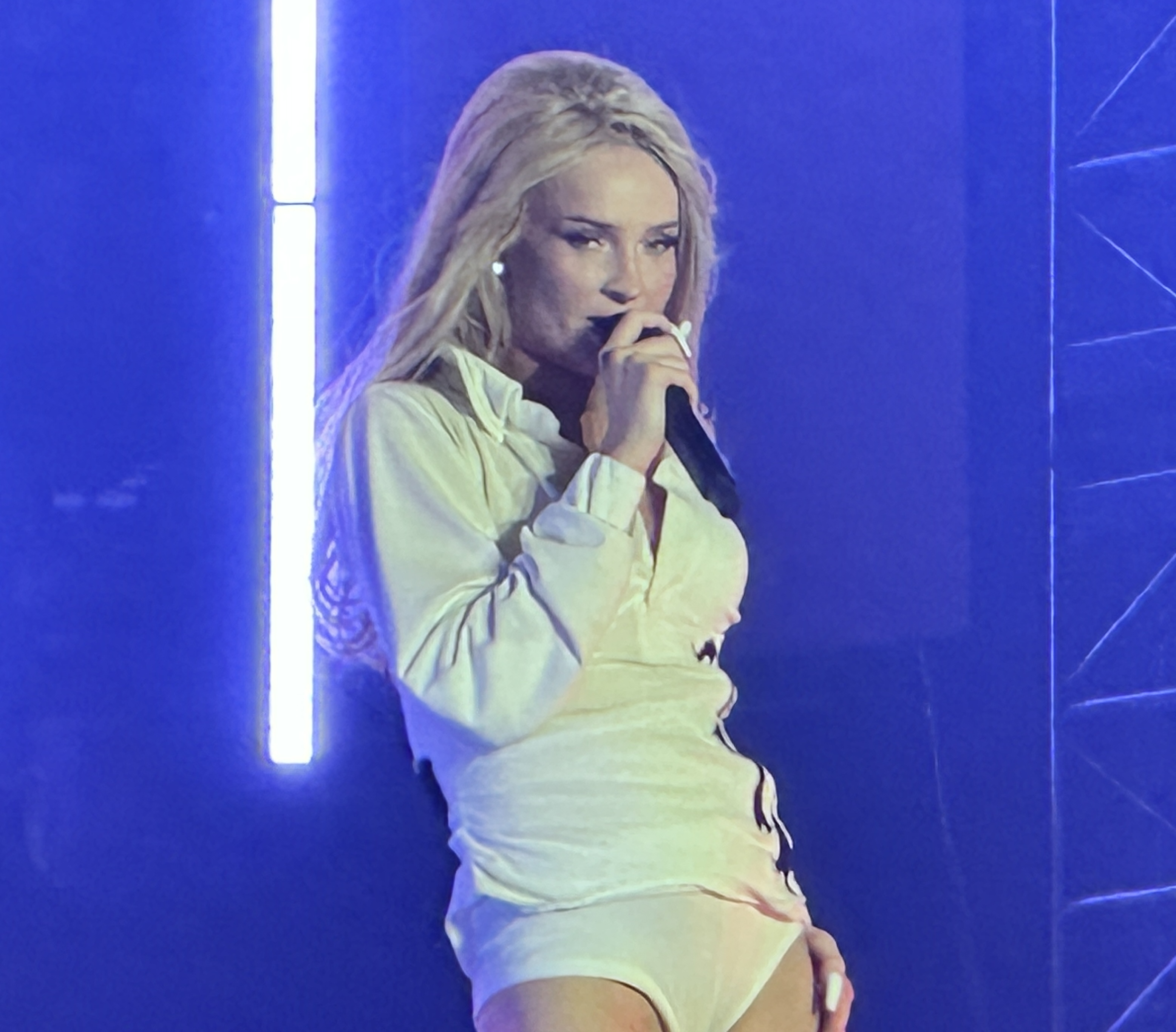
- Petras performing at the 2025 WorldPride Music Festival in Washington, D.C.
- Studio albums: 3
- EPs: 4
- Mixtapes: 2
- Compilation albums: 1
- Singles: 28
- Promotional singles: 17
- Music videos: 15

German singer Kim Petras has released three studio albums, two mixtapes, one compilation album, five extended plays (EPs), 28 singles (including seventeen as featured artist), and eighteen promotional singles. Petras began releasing several promotional singles from 2008 to 2014. Petras's debut single "I Don't Want It at All" was released in 2017 and reached the top 60 on Billboard's Dance Club Songs chart, as would her 2018 single "Heart to Break". Petras premiered her second extended play Turn Off the Light, Vol. 1 on 1 October 2018, charting on the US Independent and Heatseekers Albums charts.

== Albums ==
=== Studio albums ===
Title	Release details	Peak chart positions						
Title	Release details	GER	AUS	CAN	SWI	UK	US	US Dance
Feed the Beast	Released: 23 June 2023; Label: Amigo, Republic; Format: CD, LP, digital download, streaming	24	63	49	76	52	44	2
Problématique	Released: 18 September 2023; Label: Amigo, Republic; Format: LP, digital download, streaming	—	—	—	—	—	—	8
Detour	Released: 29 May 2026; Label: BunHead, Amigo; Format: Digital download, streaming	—	64	—	—	—	—	15
"—" denotes an item that did not chart on the respective ranking.

=== Compilation albums ===
Title	Release details
The Summer I Couldn't Do Better	Released: 4 August 2022; Label: BunHead, Amigo, Republic, UMG; Format: Digital download, streaming

=== Mixtapes ===
Title	Release details	Peak chart positions		
Title	Release details	US Current	US Heat.	US Indie
Clarity	Released: 28 June 2019; Label: BunHead; Format: Digital download, streaming, LP	78	7	26
Turn Off the Light	Released: 1 October 2019; Label: BunHead; Format: Digital download, streaming, LP	46	14	42

== Extended plays ==
Title	Release details	Peak chart positions					
Title	Release details	AUS	UK DL	US Current	US Dance	US Heat.	US Indie
One Piece of Tape	Release date: 11 March 2011; Label: Bionic Ballroom; Format: Digital download	—	—	—	—	—	—
Turn Off the Light, Vol. 1	Release date: 1 October 2018; Label: BunHead; Format: Digital download, streaming, LP	—	—	—	—	19	45
Slut Pop	Release date: 11 February 2022; Label: Amigo, Republic; Format: Digital download, streaming, CD, LP	77	34	60	—	1	—
Slut Pop Miami	Released: 14 February 2024; Label: Amigo, Republic; Format: Digital download, streaming, CD, LP	—	—	—	14	–	–
"—" denotes an item that did not chart on the respective ranking.

== Singles ==
=== As lead artist ===
List of singles as lead artist, showing year released, selected chart positions and album name
Title	Year	Peak chart positions										Certifications	Album
Title	Year	GER	AUS	AUT	CAN	IRL	NLD	NZ	SWI	UK	US	Certifications	Album
"I Don't Want It at All"	2017	—	—	—	—	—	—	—	—	—	—		Non-album singles
"Hillside Boys"	2017	—	—	—	—	—	—	—	—	—	—		Non-album singles
"Hills" (featuring Baby E)	2017	—	—	—	—	—	—	—	—	—	—		Non-album singles
"Slow It Down"	2017	—	—	—	—	—	—	—	—	—	—		Non-album singles
"Faded" (with Lil Aaron)	2017	—	—	—	—	—	—	—	—	—	—		Non-album singles
"Heart to Break"	2018	—	—	—	—	—	—	—	—	—	—		Non-album singles
"Can't Do Better"	2018	—	—	—	—	—	—	—	—	—	—		Non-album singles
"All the Time"	2018	—	—	—	—	—	—	—	—	—	—		Non-album singles
"If U Think About Me..."	2019	—	—	—	—	—	—	—	—	—	—		Non-album singles
"Homework" (featuring Lil Aaron)	2019	—	—	—	—	—	—	—	—	—	—		Non-album singles
"1, 2, 3 Dayz Up" (featuring Sophie)	2019	—	—	—	—	—	—	—	—	—	—		Non-album singles
"Icy"	2019	—	—	—	—	—	—	—	—	—	—		Clarity
"How It's Done" (with Kash Doll, Alma, and Stefflon Don)	2019	—	—	—	—	—	—	—	—	—	—		Charlie's Angels
"Reminds Me"	2020	—	—	—	—	—	—	—	—	—	—		Non-album singles
"Malibu"	2020	—	—	—	—	—	—	—	—	— (Note: "Malibu" did not chart on the UK Singles chart, but peaked at number 15 on the UK Independent Singles Breakers chart.)	—		Non-album singles
"Broken Glass" (with Kygo)	2020	—	—	—	96	—	—	—	78	—	—		Golden Hour
"Future Starts Now"	2021	—	—	—	—	—	—	—	—	—	—		Non-album single
"Coconuts"	2021	—	—	—	—	—	—	— (Note: "Coconuts" did not enter the NZ Top 40 Singles Chart, but peaked at number 23 on the NZ Hot Singles Chart.)	—	— (Note: "Coconuts" did not chart on the UK Singles chart, but peaked at number 86 on the UK Singles Downloads Chart.)	—		Feed the Beast
"Unholy" (with Sam Smith)	2022	2	1	1	1	1	1	1	2	1	1	BVMI: Platinum; ARIA: 7× Platinum; BPI: Platinum; IFPI AUT: Platinum; RMNZ: 4× Platinum; RIAA: 2× Platinum	Gloria and Feed the Beast
"If Jesus Was a Rockstar"	2022	—	—	—	—	—	—	—	—	—	—		Non-album single
"Alone" (with Nicki Minaj)	2023	—	—	—	72	35	—	— (Note: "Alone" did not enter the NZ Top 40 Singles Chart, but peaked at number four on the NZ Hot Singles Chart.)	—	37	55	MC: Gold	Feed the Beast
"When We Were Young (The Logical Song)" (with David Guetta)	2023	29	—	62	—	66	11	— (Note: "When We Were Young (The Logical Song)" did not enter the NZ Top 40 Singles Chart, but peaked at number 28 on the NZ Hot Singles Chart.)	32	51	—	BPI: Silver; RMNZ: Gold	Non-album singles
"Don't Lie" (with The Chainsmokers)	2024	—	—	—	—	—	—	— (Note: "Don't Lie" did not enter the NZ Top 40 Singles Chart, but peaked at number 29 on the NZ Hot Singles Chart.)	—	—	—		Non-album singles
"Polo"	2025	—	—	—	—	—	—	—	—	—	—		Detour
"Freak It"	2025	—	—	—	—	—	—	—	—	—	—		Detour
"I Like Ur Look"	2025	—	—	—	—	—	—	—	—	—	—		Detour
"Need for Speed"	2026	—	—	—	—	—	—	—	—	—	—		Detour
"Jeep"	2026	—	—	—	—	—	—	—	—	—	—		Detour
"Pop Sound"	2026	—	—	—	—	—	—	—	—	—	—		Detour (Rare n' Deluxe)
"—" denotes a recording that did not chart on the respective ranking.

=== As featured artist ===
Title	Year	Peak chart positions								Album
Title	Year	CAN	NZ Hot	UK	UK Indie	US Bub.	US Dance Elec.	US Rock	WW	Album
"Taste" (Sobertruth featuring Kim Petras)	2009	—	—	—	—	—	—	—	—	Non-album singles
"Magnetic" (KeeMo featuring Kim Petras)	2011	—	—	—	—	—	—	—	—	Non-album singles
"Flight to Paris" (Klaas featuring Kim Petras)	2013	—	—	—	—	—	—	—	—	Non-album singles
"Heartbeat" (Klaas featuring Kim Petras)	2013	—	—	—	—	—	—	—	—	Non-album singles
"You" (Isaac Phase featuring Kim Petras)	2015	—	—	—	—	—	—	—	—	Phase 0001
"Anymore" (Lil Aaron featuring Kim Petras)	2018	—	—	—	—	—	—	—	—	Rock$tar Famou$
"Feeling of Falling" (Cheat Codes featuring Kim Petras)	2018	—	—	—	—	—	23	—	—	Non-album singles
"Love Me Less" (MAX featuring Kim Petras)	2019	—	—	—	—	—	—	—	—	Non-album singles
"Click (No Boys Remix)" (Charli XCX featuring Kim Petras and Slayyyter)	2019	—	—	—	—	—	—	—	—	Non-album singles
"Jenny" (Studio Killers featuring Kim Petras)	2021	—	—	—	—	—	—	—	—	Non-album singles
"SugarCrash!" (ElyOtto featuring Kim Petras and Curtis Waters)	2021	81	—	59	11	23	—	10	126	Non-album singles
"Horsey" (Alex Chapman featuring Kim Petras)	2022	—	—	—	—	—	—	—	—	Non-album singles
"Made You Look" (Remix) (Meghan Trainor featuring Kim Petras)	2023	—	—	—	—	—	—	—	—	Non-album singles
"Stars Are Blind" (Paris' Version) (Paris Hilton featuring Kim Petras)	2023	—	—	—	—	—	—	—	—	Non-album singles
"TQUM" (Remix) (Sofía Reyes and Danna Paola featuring Kim Petras)	2023	—	—	—	—	—	—	—	—	Non-album singles
"Drums" (James Hype featuring Kim Petras)	2023	—	38	—	—	—	39	—	—	Non-album singles
"Flashy" (City Girls featuring Kim Petras)	2023	—	—	—	—	—	—	—	—	RAW
"Reason Why" (Sophie featuring Kim Petras and BC Kingdom)	2024	—	—	—	—	—	—	—	—	Sophie
"Radio" (Frost Children featuring Kim Petras)	2025	—	—	—	—	—	—	—	—	Sister
"—" denotes a recording that did not chart on the respective ranking.

=== Promotional singles ===
List of singles as lead artist, showing year released, selected chart positions and album name
Title	Year	Peak chart positions		Album
Title	Year	UK	US Rock	Album
"Fade Away"	2008	—	—	Non-album singles
"Last Forever"	2009	—	—	Non-album singles
"Die for You"	2009	—	—	Non-album singles
"Boomerang"	2009	—	—	Non-album singles
"STFU"	2014	—	—	Non-album singles
"Broken"	2019	—	—	Clarity
"Got My Number"	2019	—	—	Clarity
"Blow It All"	2019	—	—	Clarity
"Sweet Spot"	2019	—	—	Clarity
"All I Do Is Cry"	2019	—	—	Clarity
"Do Me"	2019	—	—	Clarity
"Clarity"	2019	—	—	Clarity
"Personal Hell"	2019	—	—	Clarity
"Another One"	2019	—	—	Clarity
"Party Till I Die"	2020	—	—	Turn Off the Light
"Running Up That Hill"	2022	100	43	Non-album single
"Brrr"	2023	—	—	Feed the Beast
"Ein Tausend Teile"	2024	—	—	Non-album single
"—" denotes a recording that did not chart on the respective ranking.

== Other charted songs ==
Title	Year	Peak chart positions			Album
Title	Year	NZ Hot	US Dance	US World Dig.	Album
"Villain" (K/DA featuring Madison Beer and Kim Petras)	2020	21	—	4	All Out
"Treat Me Like a Slut"	2022	36	—	—	Slut Pop
"Feed the Beast"	2023	—	34	—	Feed the Beast
"King of Hearts"	2023	26	17	—	Feed the Beast
"Uhoh"	2023	—	30	—	Feed the Beast
"Revelations"	2023	—	40	—	Feed the Beast
"Claws"	2023	—	35	—	Feed the Beast
"Castle in the Sky"	2023	—	50	—	Feed the Beast
"Gorgeous" (Katy Perry featuring Kim Petras)	2024	17	—	—	143
"Detour"	2026	40	—	—	Detour
"Brutalist"	2026	37	—	—	Detour
"—" denotes a recording that did not chart on the respective ranking.

== Guest appearances ==
Title	Year	Other artist(s)	Album
"Unlock It"	2017	Charli XCX, Jay Park	Pop 2
"The Drugs Don't Work"	2018	Baby E	Non-album song
"Click"	2019	Charli XCX, Tommy Cash	Charli
"Broken Glass"	2020	Kygo	Golden Hour
"Villain"	2020	K/DA, Madison Beer	All Out
"Gorgeous"	2024	Katy Perry	143

== Songwriting credits ==
Title	Year	Artist(s)	Album
"Flight to Paris"	2013	Klaas	Non-album songs
"Heartbeat"	2013	Klaas	Non-album songs
"Love a Little Harder"	2014	JoJo	Non-album songs
"Strip"	2014	JoJo	Non-album songs
"Tell Me"	2014	JoJo	Non-album songs
"That's What's Up"	2015	Skylar Stecker	This Is Me
"Bratz What's Up"	2015	Skylar Stecker	Non-album songs
"Chameleon"	2016	Alyssa Suede, DJ Manifesto	Non-album songs
"Limousines"	2017	Vali	Non-album songs
"Young & Wild"	2018	Twice	Yes or Yes
"BTR 2GTHR"	2019	Liz	Planet Y2K
"Reminds Me of You"	2020	The Kid Laroi, Juice WRLD	Non-album single

== Music videos ==
Title	Year	Type	Director(s)
"Die for You"	2009	Official	Unknown
"Feel It"	2011	Official	Maison Kelmd
"One Piece of Tape"	2011	Official	Kim Petras / Linestyle Artwork
"Heartbeat"	2013	Official	Unknown
"I Don't Want It at All"	2017	Official	Charlotte Rutherford
"Faded"	2018	Official	Nicholas Harwood
"Can't Do Better"	2018	Lyric	Nicholas Harwood
"Feeling of Falling" (with Cheat Codes)	2018	Lyric	Unknown
"Heart to Break"	2018	Official	Nicholas Harwood
"Feeling of Falling" (unreleased)	2018	Official	Unknown
"Anymore" (Lil Aaron featuring Kim Petras)	2018	Official	Lewis Grant
"1, 2, 3 Dayz Up" (featuring Sophie)	2019	Lyric	Unknown
"Broken"	2019	Lyric	Unknown
"Got My Number"	2019	Lyric	Unknown
"Blow It All"	2019	Lyric	Unknown
"Sweet Spot"	2019	Lyric	Unknown
"All I Do Is Cry"	2019	Lyric	Unknown
"Do Me"	2019	Lyric	Unknown
"Clarity"	2019	Lyric	Unknown
"Personal Hell"	2019	Lyric	Unknown
"Another One"	2019	Lyric	Unknown
"Icy"	2019	Lyric	Unknown
"Meet the Parents"	2019	Lyric	Unknown
"Shinin'"	2019	Lyric	Unknown
"Icy"	2019	Official	Alexandre Moors
"Reminds Me"	2020	Live	Micah Bickham
"Reminds Me"	2020	Live	Unknown
"Malibu"	2020	Visual	Pilar Zeta
"Malibu" (At Home Edition)	2020	Official	Unknown
"Broken Glass" (Kygo featuring Kim Petras)	2020	Official	Griffin Stoddard
"Future Starts Now"	2021	Lyric	Katia Temkin
"Future Starts Now"	2021	Official	Unknown
"Coconuts"	2021	Lyric	John Howe
"Coconuts"	2022	Performance	Unknown
"If Jesus Was A Rockstar"	2022	Lyric	Isobel Rae
"Unholy" (Sam Smith featuring Kim Petras)	2022	Official	Floria Sigismondi
"Brrr"	2022	Lyric	Unknown
"Feed The Beast"	2023	Lyric	The Valdez
"Alone"	2023	Lyric	Judson & Molly Valdez
"King of Hearts"	2023	Lyric	The Valdez
"Thousand Pieces"	2023	Lyric	The Valdez
"Uhoh"	2023	Lyric	The Valdez
"Revelations"	2023	Lyric	The Valdez
"Bait"(featuring BANKS)	2023	Lyric	The Valdez
"Sextalk"	2023	Lyric	The Valdez
"Hit It From The Back"	2023	Lyric	The Valdez
"Claws"	2023	Lyric	The Valdez
"Minute"	2023	Lyric	The Valdez
"Castle In The Sky"	2023	Lyric	The Valdez
"Flashy" (City Girls featuring Kim Petras)	2023	Official	Unknown
"When We Were Young (The Logical Song)" (David Guetta featuring Kim Petras)	2023	Official	Hannah Lux Davis
"When We Were Young (The Logical Song)" (David Guetta featuring Kim Petras)	2023	Lyric	Unknown
"Get Fucked"	2024	Advert/Teaser	Cody Critcheloe
"Can We Fuck?"	2024	Advert/Teaser	Cody Critcheloe
"Cockblocker"	2024	Advert/Teaser	Cody Critcheloe
"Head Head Honcho"	2024	Advert/Teaser	Cody Critcheloe
"Slut Pop Reprise"	2024	Lyric/Visualizer	Matt Woosley
"Gag On It"	2024	Lyric/Visualizer	Matt Woosley
"Fuckin' This Fuckin' That"	2024	Lyric/Visualizer	Matt Woosley
"Banana Boat"	2024	Lyric/Visualizer	Matt Woosley
"Get Fucked"	2024	Lyric/Visualizer	Matt Woosley
"Rim Job"	2024	Lyric/Visualizer	Matt Woosley
"Cockblocker"	2024	Lyric/Visualizer	Matt Woosley
"Butt Slutt"	2024	Lyric/Visualizer	Matt Woosley
"Head Head Honcho"	2024	Lyric/Visualizer	Matt Woosley
"Cubana"	2024	Lyric/Visualizer	Matt Woosley
"Whale Cock"	2024	Lyric/Visualizer	Matt Woosley
"Can We Fuck?"	2024	Lyric/Visualizer	Matt Woosley
"Ein Tausend Teile"	2024	Lyric	Unknown
"Polo"	2025	Visualizer	Unknown
"I Like Ur Look"	2025	Official	Ashley Hood
"Freak It"	2025	Official	Normies Nightmare
"Pop Sound"	2026	Official	Unknown
"Mr. Producer"	2026	Official	Eli Sheppard
"Cha Cha"	2026	Official	Eli Sheppard
"Get Some"	2026	Official	Eli Sheppard
"Need For Speed"	2026	Official	Ashley Hood
"Jeep"	2026	Official	Leonie Miller-Aichholz
"Brutalist"	2026	Official	Leonie Miller-Aichholz
