= Feed the Beast World Tour =

2023–2024 concert tour by Kim Petras

- Tour by Kim Petras
- Official tour poster
- Location: Brazil; Europe; North America
- Associated albums: Feed the Beast; Problématique
- Start date: 4 August 2023
- End date: 5 March 2024
- Legs: 2
- No. of shows: 39

Kim Petras concert chronology
- Clarity Tour (2019–2020); Feed the Beast World Tour (2023–2024); De-Tour (2026)

The Feed the Beast World Tour was the third headlining tour by German singer Kim Petras, in support of her debut and sophomore studio albums, Feed the Beast and Problématique (both 2023). The tour commenced on 4 August 2023 in Mountain View and concluded in Milan, Italy on 5 March 2024.

== Background ==
German singer and songwriter Kim Petras embarked on her second tour—the Clarity Tour—from October 2019 to February 2020, in support of her debut mixtape Clarity. Petras signed to Republic Records in 2021 and released the Slut Pop EP in February 2022. After scrapping what would have been her debut studio album in August 2022, she released three singles, "Unholy" with Sam Smith, "If Jesus Was a Rockstar", and "Brrr" in late 2022 and early 2023.

In February 2023, Petras stated that she had been working on her debut studio album for three years, and subsequently released "Alone" with Nicki Minaj on 21 April, serving as the lead single. The album, Feed the Beast, was announced on 15 May 2023, with a release date of 23 June.

== Development ==
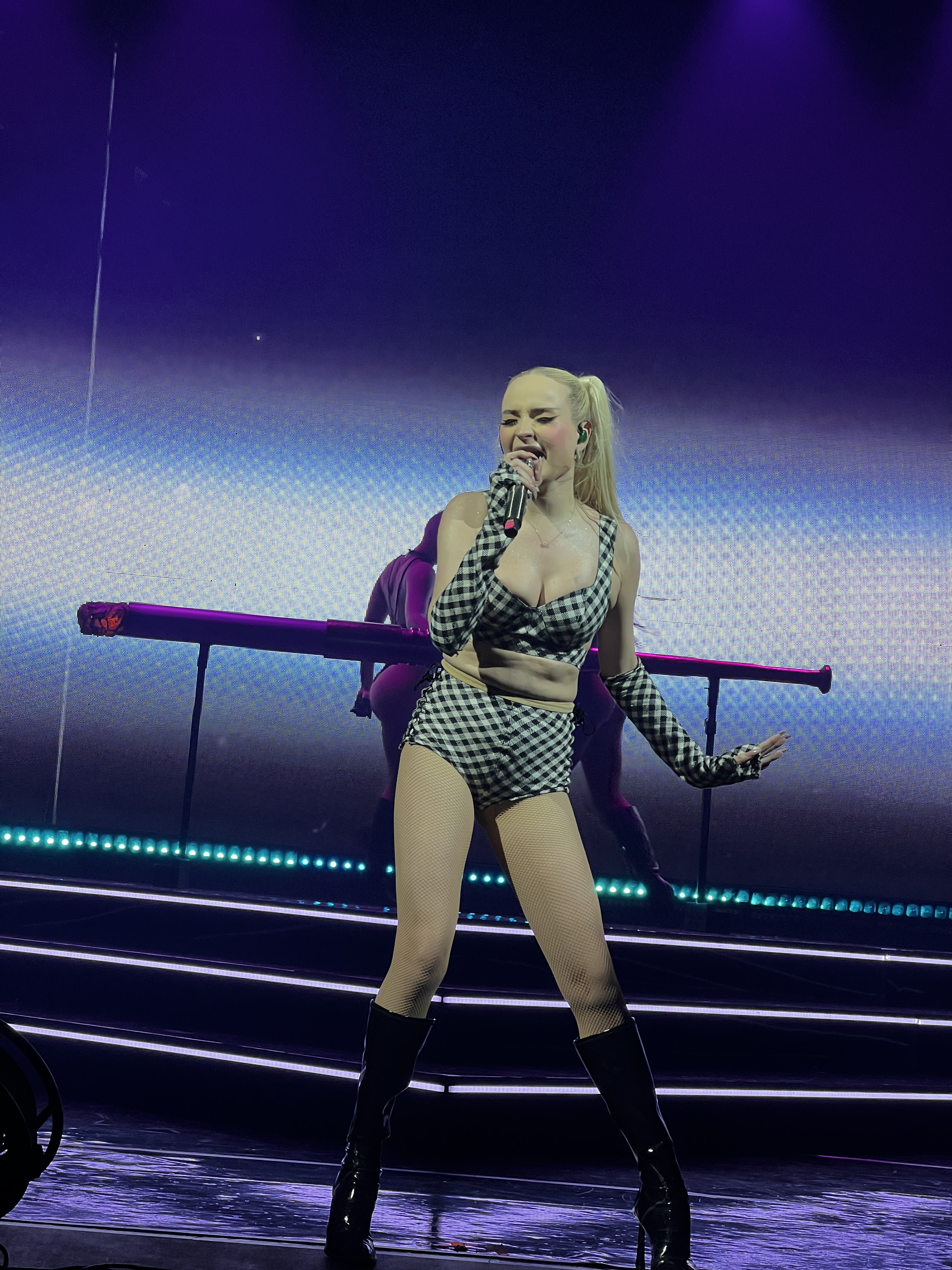
Petras performing on the tour's Warsaw stop, in 2024

The Feed the Beast World Tour was announced on 21 June 2023, two days prior to the release of the album. The tour was announced via Petras' social media accounts, with a teaser video being released alongside the announcement.

Petras started the tour in Mountain View, California on 4 August 2023. This started the North American leg, which will take place from September to November 2023, travelling to the United States and Canada. She will then embark on the European leg of the tour in February and March 2024, playing shows in England, Scotland, Belgium, France, Germany, the Netherlands, and Poland, before ending the tour in Milan, Italy on 5 March. The tour spanned 39 shows in total.

This tour utilized two distinct setlists. The initial setlist, used for the American leg, featured five distinct segments: Iron Maiden; Slut Pop; Garden; Turn Off the Light; and Blizzard. This was followed by an encore.

The European leg adopted a shorter setlist with four segments and an encore. The "Garden" and "Turn Off the Light" segments were removed. The "Slut Pop" segment was revised to include songs from both the original album and the newly released "Slut Pop Miami". A new third act, titled "Problématique", was added to showcase material from the previously-shelved album of the same name. Finally, a new fourth act titled "The Hits" incorporated early singles from Era 1 and Clarity, alongside fan favorites popularized on social media platforms like Twitter and TikTok and television shows such as The Summer I Turned Pretty ("Can't Do Better").

== Set list ==
2023

Act 1 - Iron Maiden

1. "Feed the Beast"
2. "Personal Hell"
3. "King of Hearts"
4. "Revelations"
5. "Unholy"

Act 2 - Slut Pop

6. "Kim Kim Kim" (Interlude)
7. "Slut Pop"
8. "Treat Me Like a Slut"
9. "XXX"
10. "Superpower Bitch"
11. "Throat Goat"
12. "They Wanna Fuck"
13. "Your Wish Is My Command"
14. "Treat Me Like a Ho"

Act 3 - Garden

15. "Claws"
16. "Hillside Boys"
17. "Something About U"
18. "Hit It from the Back"
19. "Bait"

Act 4 - Turn Off the Light

20. "Omen" (Interlude)
21. "Turn Off the Light"
22. "Wrong Turn"
23. "There Will Be Blood"
24. "Demons" (Interlude)
25. "In the Next Life"
26. "Everybody Dies"

Act 5 - Blizzard

27. "Brrr"
28. "Icy"
29. "Minute"
30. "Castle in the Sky"

Encore

31. "Alone"
32. "Problématique"
33. "Heart to Break"
2024

Act 1 - Iron Maiden

1. "Feed the Beast"
2. "Personal Hell"
3. "Revelations"
4. "King of Hearts"
5. "Unholy"

Act 2 - Slut Pop

6. "Hacker" (Interlude)
7. "Slut Pop"
8. "Treat Me Like a Slut"
9. "XXX"
10. "Throat Goat"
11. "Slut Pop (Reprise)"
12. "Head Head Honcho"
13. "Gag On It"

Act 3 - Problématique

14. "All She Wants"
15. "Je T'Adore"
16. "Problématique"
17. "Deeper"

Act 4 - The Hits

18. "Woo Ah" (Interlude)
19. "I Don't Want It at All"
20. "Hillside Boys"
21. "Can't Do Better"
22. "Sweet Spot"
23. "Coconuts"

Encore

24. "Alone"
25. "Heart to Break"

=== Additional Notes ===
- During the show in Brooklyn, "Uhoh" was performed after "Heart to Break".
- On November 8 and November 13, "In the Next Life" and "Everybody Dies" were not performed.
- On February 27, Kim performed the German version of "Thousand Pieces", titled "Ein Tausend Teile", in Cologne. The song was released as a single to streaming services that same day.

== Tour dates ==
List of concerts
Date	City	Country	Venue	Opening acts	Attendance	Revenue
North America
4 August 2023 (Note: The concert on 4 August 2023 at Shoreline Amphitheatre in Mountain View is in support of the Jonas Brothers.)	Mountain View	United States	Shoreline Amphitheatre	—N/a	—N/a	—N/a
6 August 2023 (Note: The concert on 6 August 2023 at Parc Jean-Drapeau in Montreal is part of the Osheaga Music and Arts Festival.)	Montreal	Canada	Parc Jean-Drapeau	—N/a	—N/a	—N/a
South America
10 September 2023 (Note: The concert on 10 September 2023, at Autódromo José Carlos Pace in São Paulo is part of the Town Festival.)	São Paulo	Brazil	Autódromo de Interlagos	—N/a	—N/a	—N/a
North America
24 September 2023 (Note: The concert on 24 September 2023, in Downtown Las Vegas is part of the Life Is Beautiful Music & Art Festival.)	Las Vegas	United States	Downtown Las Vegas	TBA	—	—
27 September 2023	Austin	United States	Moody Amphitheater	TBA	—	—
1 October 2023	Orlando	United States	Addition Financial Arena	TBA	3,152 / 7,895	—
4 October 2023	Atlanta	United States	Coca-Cola Roxy	TBA	—	—
7 October 2023	Boston	United States	MGM Music Hall at Fenway	TBA	2,155 / 4,863	—
9 October 2023	Brooklyn (Note: Promoted as New York City)	United States	The Brooklyn Mirage	TBA	3,108 / 5,015	—
12 October 2023	Washington, D.C.	United States	The Anthem	TBA	2,028 / 5,855	—
13 October 2023	Philadelphia	United States	TD Pavilion	TBA	—	—
15 October 2023	Montreal	Canada	L'Olympia	TBA	—	—
16 October 2023	Toronto	Canada	Coca-Cola Coliseum	TBA	2,401 / 6,788	—
18 October 2023	Chicago	United States	Byline Bank Aragon Ballroom	TBA	—	—
19 October 2023	Minneapolis	United States	Minneapolis Armory	TBA	3,012 / 8,550	—
23 October 2023	Seattle	United States	WaMu Theater	TBA	—	—
26 October 2023	Vancouver	Canada	PNE Forum	TBA	1,189 / 5,907	—
27 October 2023	Portland	United States	Veterans Memorial Coliseum	TBA	2,886 / 9,408	—
29 October 2023	San Francisco	United States	Bill Graham Civic Auditorium	TBA	3,002 / 6,188	—
1 November 2023	Inglewood (Note: Promoted as Los Angeles)	United States	YouTube Theater	TBA	3,508 / 5,612	—
2 November 2023	Phoenix	United States	Arizona Financial Theatre	TBA	2,871 / 4,888	—
5 November 2023	San Diego	United States	CalCoast Credit Union Open Air Theatre	TBA	—	—
8 November 2023	Denver	United States	Fillmore Auditorium	TBA	—	—
11 November 2023	Nashville	United States	Nashville Municipal Auditorium	TBA	2,627 / 7,992	—
13 November 2023	Dallas	United States	South Side Ballroom	TBA	—	—
14 November 2023	Houston	United States	713 Music Hall	TBA	—	—
18 November 2023 (Note: The concert on 18 November 2023, at Autódromo Hermanos Rodriguez in Mexico City is part of the Corona Capital Festival.)	Mexico City	Mexico	Autódromo Hermanos Rodriguez	—N/a	—N/a	—N/a
Europe
13 February 2024	Birmingham	England	O_{2} Academy Birmingham	TBA	—	—
15 February 2024	Glasgow	Scotland	O_{2} Academy Glasgow	TBA	—	—
16 February 2024	Manchester	England	O_{2} Victoria Warehouse	TBA	—	—
19 February 2024	London	England	Eventim Apollo	TBA	—	—
24 February 2024	Brussels	Belgium	Ancienne Belgique	TBA	—	—
25 February 2024	Paris	France	L'Olympia	TBA	—	—
27 February 2024	Cologne	Germany	Palladium Köln	TBA	—	—
28 February 2024	Amsterdam	Netherlands	Gashouder	TBA	—	—
1 March 2024	Berlin	Germany	Columbiahalle	TBA	—	—
2 March 2024	Warsaw	Poland	Expo XXI International Centre	TBA	—	—
4 March 2024	Munich	Germany	TonHalle	TBA	—	—
5 March 2024	Milan	Italy	Fabrique	TBA	—	—
