= Clarity Tour =

2019–20 concert tour by Kim Petras

- Tour by Kim Petras
- Associated album: Clarity
- Start date: 21 October 2019
- End date: 11 February 2020
- No. of shows: 25 in North America; 12 in Europe; 37 in total

Kim Petras concert chronology
- Broken Tour (2019); Clarity Tour (2019–2020); Feed the Beast World Tour (2023–2024)

The Clarity Tour was the second concert tour by German singer Kim Petras in support of her debut mixtape, Clarity (2019). The tour was announced by Petras via her social media accounts on 4 September 2019. It started on 21 October 2019 in Vancouver, Canada and concluded on 11 February 2020 in London, England.

== Background and development ==
The tour was announced on 4 September 2019, following the conclusion of Petras' debut tour, the Broken Tour, on the same day. It was initially scheduled to comprise 23 North American shows between 21 October and 8 December 2019 and to start in Vancouver, Canada and to conclude in San Diego, United States. Due to the original dates selling out, a second night of shows was later added in both New York and Boston, bringing the total number of North American shows to 25.

On October 14, 2019, a week prior to the start of the tour, a European leg was announced. It was scheduled to comprise 13 additional shows between 24 January and 11 February 2020 and to start in Amsterdam, Netherlands and to conclude in London, England, however, the show in Glasgow, Scotland, on 5 February 2020 was later canceled due to illness.

== Set list ==
This set list is representative of the European leg of the tour and the performance on 24 January 2020.

1. "Clarity"
2. "Meet the Parents"
3. "Blow It All"
4. "I Don't Want It at All"
5. "Got My Number"
6. "Hillside Boys"
7. "Unlock It" / "Click"
8. "Purgatory"
9. "There Will Be Blood"
10. "Wrong Turn"
11. "Demons"
12. "Death By Sex"
13. "Close Your Eyes"
14. "Everybody Dies"
15. "Human" (The Killers cover)
16. "Reminds Me"
17. "Icy"
18. "Do Me"
19. "Can't Do Better"

Encore

20. "Heart to Break"
21. "1, 2, 3 Dayz Up"
22. "Sweet Spot"

== Tour dates ==
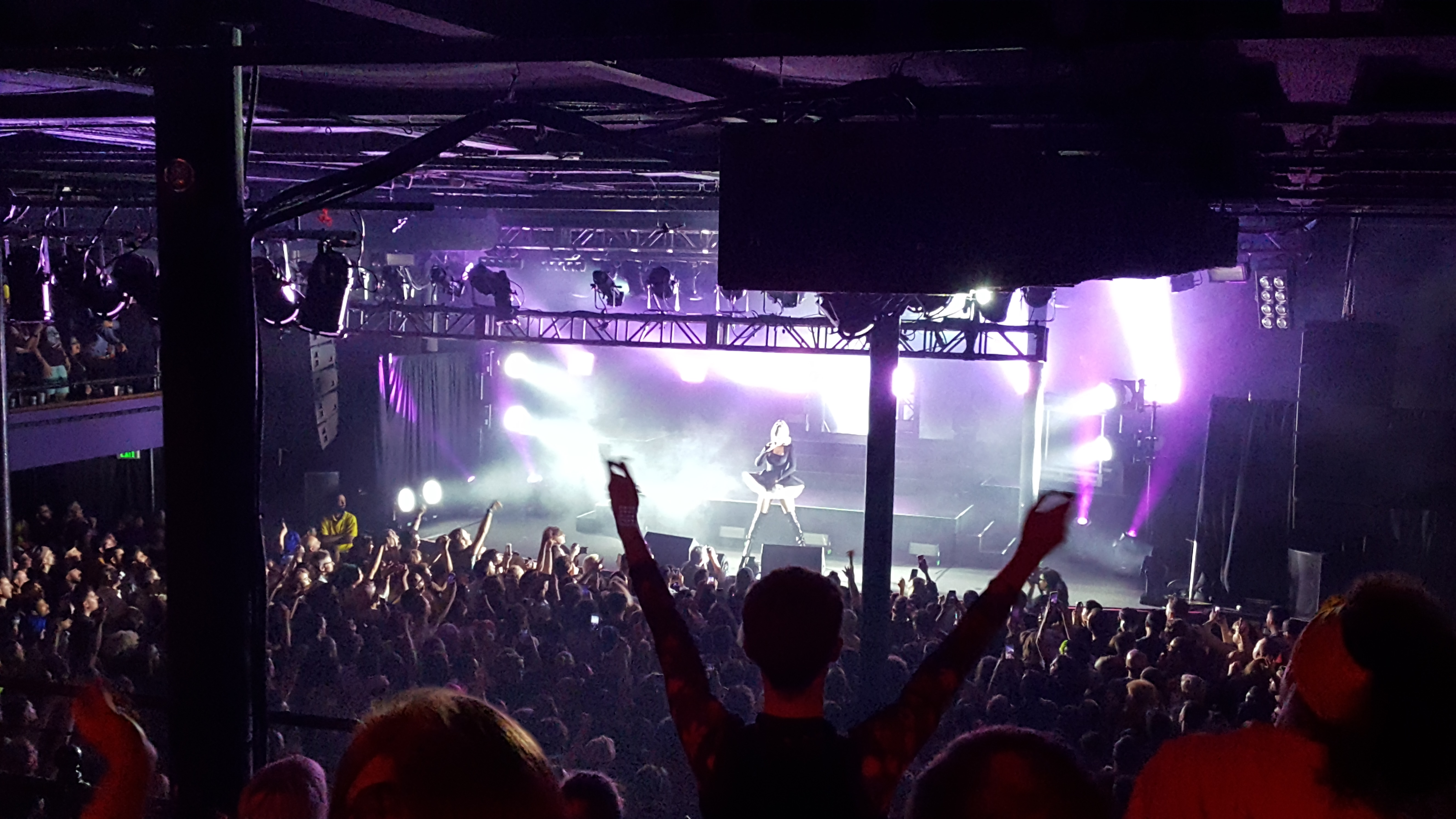
Petras performing at Roseland Theater in Portland, Oregon, 2019

Date	City	Country	Venue
North America
21 October 2019	Vancouver	Canada	Vogue Theatre
22 October 2019	Seattle	United States	The Showbox
24 October 2019	Portland	United States	Roseland Theater
26 October 2019	Oakland	United States	Fox Oakland Theatre
28 October 2019	Sacramento	United States	Ace of Spades
30 October 2019	Los Angeles	United States	Shrine Exposition Hall
3 November 2019	Austin	United States	Emo's
4 November 2019	Dallas	United States	House of Blues
8 November 2019	Orlando	United States	The Plaza Live
11 November 2019	Nashville	United States	Cannery Ballroom
12 November 2019	Atlanta	United States	Tabernacle
14 November 2019	Charlotte	United States	The Underground
16 November 2019	New York City	United States	Avant Gardner
17 November 2019	New York City	United States	Avant Gardner
19 November 2019	Philadelphia	United States	The Fillmore Philadelphia
20 November 2019	Silver Spring	United States	The Fillmore Silver Spring
22 November 2019	Boston	United States	Royale
23 November 2019	Boston	United States	Royale
25 November 2019	Toronto	Canada	Phoenix Concert Theatre
27 November 2019	Chicago	United States	Riviera Theatre
30 November 2019	Saint Paul	United States	Palace Theatre
1 December 2019	Kansas City	United States	The Truman
4 December 2019	Denver	United States	Ogden Theatre
5 December 2019	Salt Lake City	United States	The Depot
8 December 2019	San Diego	United States	The Observatory
Europe
24 January 2020	Amsterdam	Netherlands	Melkweg
26 January 2020	Hamburg	Germany	Docks
27 January 2020	Copenhagen	Denmark	Vega
29 January 2020	Berlin	Germany	Metropol
30 January 2020	Antwerp	Belgium	ZAPPA
1 February 2020	Cologne	Germany	Live Music Hall
2 February 2020	Paris	France	Le Trianon
4 February 2020	Dublin	Ireland	The Academy
7 February 2020	Birmingham	England	O2 Academy Birmingham
8 February 2020	Manchester	England	Manchester Academy 2
9 February 2020	Manchester	England	Manchester Academy 2
11 February 2020	London	England	O2 Shepherd's Bush Empire

Cancelled shows
Date	City	Country	Venue	Reason
5 February 2020	Glasgow	Scotland	SWG3	Illness
