= Turn Off the Light (disambiguation) =

"Turn Off the Light" is a 2001 song by Nelly Furtado.

Turn Off the Light may also refer to:

== Music ==
=== Albums and EPs ===
- Turn Off the Light (mixtape), a 2019 mixtape by Kim Petras
- Turn Off the Light, Vol. 1, a 2018 EP by Kim Petras
- Turn Off the Lights, a 2019 EP by Dog Blood

=== Songs ===
- "Turn Off the Light", a 2018 song by Kim Petras from Turn Off the Light, Vol. 1
- "Turn Off the Lights", a 1979 song by Teddy Pendergrass
- "Turn Off the Lights", a 1987 song by World Class Wreckin' Cru
- "Turn Off the Lights", a 2023 song by Ava Max from Diamonds & Dancefloors
- "Turn Off the Lights", a 2011 song by Panic! at the Disco from the Album Vices & Virtues

== Other ==
- Turn off the Light!, a Russian satirical television program

== See also ==
- "Turn the Lights Off", a song by Kato featuring Jon
- Turn Out the Lights (disambiguation)
