= Broken Tour =

2019 concert tour by Kim Petras

- Tour by Kim Petras
- Associated album: Clarity
- Start date: 11 June 2019
- End date: 4 September 2019
- No. of shows: 12 in North America; 8 in Europe; 20 in total

Kim Petras concert chronology
- Broken Tour (2019); Clarity Tour (2019–2020)

The Broken Tour was the debut concert tour by German singer Kim Petras in support of her debut mixtape, Clarity (2019). The tour was announced by Petras via her social media accounts on April 30, 2019. It started on 11 June 2019 in Nashville, United States and concluded on 4 September 2019 in Cologne, Germany.

== Background and development ==
When announced on April 30, 2019, the tour was scheduled to comprise ten North American shows in June and to conclude on 26 June 2019 in San Francisco, United States. It was initially considered to be in support of Petras' single "Broken", as her debut mixtape had not been officially announced yet.

On 2 May 2019 additional shows in San Francisco and Los Angeles were announced. The following day Petras disclosed that both shows in Los Angeles as well as the shows in New York and Chicago were sold out. On 7 May 2019, a week after the initial tour announcement, all shows with the exception of Atlanta, Washington and the added San Francisco show were sold out.

On 13 May 2019 Petras announced that a European leg of the tour, comprising additional shows in the United Kingdom, France, the Netherlands and Germany, had been added. Thus, the tour would encompass 20 shows, including 17 solo shows as well as 3 festival appearance in the United Kingdom on the 23, 24 and 25 of August 2019. Due to high demand several venues for the European leg had to be upgraded.

On 31 May 2019 Petras revealed that rehearsals for the tour had started.

== Set list ==
This set list is representative of the European leg of the tour and the performance on September 4, 2019. Due to starting before the entirety of Clarity had been released, the set list varied greatly for the duration of the tour. Song titles adapted from Spotify.

Act I

1. "Got My Number"
2. "Hillside Boys"
3. "Hills"
4. "Blow It All"
5. "Broken"
6. "Icy"

Act II

7. "Omen"
8. "Close Your Eyes"
9. "Personal Hell"
10. "In the Next Life"
11. "Boo! Bitch!"

Act III

12. "If U Think About Me…"
13. "Do Me"
14. "All the Time"
15. "1, 2, 3 Dayz Up"
16. "I Don't Want It at All"
17. "Unlock It"

Encore

18. "Can't Do Better"
19. "Heart to Break"
20. "Sweet Spot"

== Tour dates ==
Date	City	Country	Venue
North America
June 11, 2019	Nashville	United States	The Basement East
June 12, 2019	Atlanta	United States	Center Stage
June 14, 2019	New York City	United States	Irving Plaza
June 15, 2019	Silver Spring	United States	The Fillmore Silver Spring
June 17, 2019	Philadelphia	United States	Theatre of Living Arts
June 18, 2019	Cambridge	United States	The Sinclair
June 20, 2019	Chicago	United States	Lincoln Hall
June 21, 2019	Minneapolis	United States	Fine Line Music Café
June 24, 2019	Los Angeles	United States	Fonda Theatre
June 25, 2019	Los Angeles	United States	Fonda Theatre
July 30, 2019	San Francisco	United States	Mezzanine
July 31, 2019	San Francisco	United States	Mezzanine
Europe
August 23, 2019	Leeds	United Kingdom	Leeds Festival
August 24, 2019	Manchester	United Kingdom	Manchester Pride
August 25, 2019	Reading	United Kingdom	Reading Festival
August 27, 2019	London	United Kingdom	Heaven
August 30, 2019	Paris	France	La Maroquinerie
September 1, 2019	Amsterdam	Netherlands	Paradiso
September 3, 2019	Berlin	Germany	Bi Nuu
September 4, 2019	Cologne	Germany	Club Bahnhof Ehrenfeld

== Reception ==
Most shows of the North American leg were sold out. Further, many had to move to bigger venues due to high demand. Similarly, most shows of the European leg were also sold out or had to move to bigger venues in order to accommodate the demand.

The tour was generally very well received. Rae Lemeshow-Barooshian of Play Too Much praised it as a "euphoric pop rendezvous" and called it "an explosion of joy" whenever Petras took the stage. Michiel Vos of A Bit of Pop Music compared Petras' stage outfits and styling to "Lady Gaga's looks during her The Fame era" and attested that Petras looked "like an absolute star when dancing and posing". He further stated that Petras commands "a mesmerizing star quality" and would also hold her own vocally, even though oftentimes singing along to a backing track. Writing for Atwood Magazine, Nicole Almeida also stressed Petras' star quality, calling the tour the "perfect demonstration of Petras' star power". She further referred to the concert as "more than a show", but a "visual representation of Kim Petras' career" and concluded that she witnessed "a night of transcendental joy, pride, celebration, and fun". In his review of the first stop of the European leg, Alex Rigotti of Gigwise especially praised Petras' self-awareness in regards to "how ridiculous pop is". He identified the show to follow a structure in accordance with Petras' body of work. Thus, he referred to act I as a representation of heartbreak from her debut record, Clarity, the second act as being representative of her Halloween-themed extended play (EP), Turn Off the Light, Vol. 1, and the third act as being "about the ecstasy of falling in love from her Era 1 days". Even though the staging was "stripped down and simple", he declared it to be "effective" through "being fuelled by the charm of the singer feeling her fantasy".
