= Reminds Me of You =

Reminds Me of You may refer to:

- "Reminds Me of You", a 2011 song by LMFAO from the album Sorry for Party Rocking
- "Reminds me of You", a 1999 song by Van Morrison from the album Back on Top
- "Reminds Me of You" (Juice Wrld and the Kid Laroi song), 2020

== See also ==
- "Reminds Me", a 2020 song by Kim Petras
