= Era 1 =

2017–2019 series of singles by Kim Petras

The Summer I Couldn't Do Better

Compilation album by Kim Petras
- Released: 4 August 2022
- Recorded: 2017–2019
- Length: 41:08
- Labels: BunHead Records; Amigo; Republic; UMG Recordings
- Producers: Cirkut; Aaron Joseph; Made in China; B Ham; Jon Castelli; Kojak; Detail; Sophie; A.C.

Kim Petras chronology
Slut Pop (2022)	The Summer I Couldn't Do Better (2022)	Feed the Beast (2023)

The Summer I Couldn't Do Better is the first compilation album by German singer Kim Petras. It was released onto streaming platforms on August 4, 2022 and was delisted shortly afterwards. The album contains eleven standalone singles released between August 1, 2017 to February 7, 2019 featuring co-writing credits by Petras, Aaron Joseph and Dr. Luke, as well as co-production credits by Aaron Joseph and Dr. Luke (under his pseudonym Made in China).

== Background and release ==
"I Don't Want It at All" was the first single, released on 1 August 2017; a music video co-starring Paris Hilton was released on 30 October 2017. The second and third singles, "Hills" and "Hillside Boys", were released on 22 September 2017. The fourth single, "Slow It Down", was released on 10 November 2017. The fifth single, "Faded", was released on 15 December 2017, and a music video was released on 25 January 2018. The sixth single, "Heart to Break" was released on 14 February 2018, and a music video was released on 26 April 2018. The seventh single, "Can't Do Better", was released on 8 June 2018. The eighth single, "All the Time", was released on 24 August 2018. The ninth to eleventh singles, "1, 2, 3 Dayz Up", "Homework" and "If U Think About Me...", were released on 7 February 2019, marking the final releases from the project.

Petras described the project as a "full rainbow", in reference to all the single covers utilizing a gradient of colors, and wished to complete "Era 1" before releasing her debut mixtape, Clarity. To coincide with the release of Clarity, Petras embarked on the Broken Tour in 2019, which also included the majority of "Era 1" on its setlist.

In 2022, following the inclusion of "Can't Do Better" in season 1 of the TV series The Summer I Turned Pretty, Universal Music Group released the compilation onto streaming platforms on 4 August 2022, containing all eleven singles in release order, though this compilation was delisted shortly afterwards.

== Critical reception ==
The standalone singles themselves received generally positive reviews from critics upon their original release, who mainly praised the overall dance-pop sound, as well as their catchiness. The collection of singles is noted to have contributed to Petras' commercial breakthrough, as a few of the tracks entered various Billboard charts upon their release.

== Track listing ==
The Summer I Couldn't Do Better track listing
No.	Title	Writer(s)	Producer(s)	Length
1.	"I Don't Want It at All"	Kim Petras; Henry Russell Walter; Aaron Joseph; Aaron Jennings; Lukasz Gottwald	Cirkut; Joseph; Made in China	4:10
2.	"Hills" (featuring Baby E)	Petras; Joseph; Brandon Hamlin; Ethan Lowery; Gottwald	B Ham; Joseph; Made in China	3:59
3.	"Hillside Boys"	Petras; Joseph; Jon Castelli; Gottwald	Jon Castelli; Joseph; Made in China	3:38
4.	"Slow It Down"	Petras; Joseph; Walter; Allan Peter Grigg; Gottwald	Kojak; Cirkut; Joseph; Made in China	3:44
5.	"Faded" (featuring Lil Aaron)	Petras; Joseph; Jennings; Walter; Noel Fisher; Gottwald	Detail; Joseph; Made in China	4:04
6.	"Heart to Break"	Petras; Joseph; Walter; Jacob Kasher Hindlin; Gottwald	Cirkut; Joseph; Made in China	3:45
7.	"Can't Do Better"	Petras; Joseph; Walter; Gottwald	Cirkut; Joseph; Made in China	3:08
8.	"All the Time"	Petras; Joseph; Walter; Gottwald	Cirkut; Joseph; Made in China	3:15
9.	"1, 2, 3 Dayz Up" (featuring Sophie)	Petras; Sophie Xeon; Joseph; Gottwald	Sophie; Joseph; Made in China	3:33
10.	"Homework" (featuring Lil Aaron)	Petras; Joseph; Jennings; Lowery; Gottwald	Joseph; Made in China	4:18
11.	"If U Think About Me..."	Petras; Joseph; Alexander Castillo Vasquez; Lowery; Gottwald	A.C.; Joseph; Made in China	3:28
Total length:				41:08
