= Kim Petras =

German singer and songwriter (born 1992)

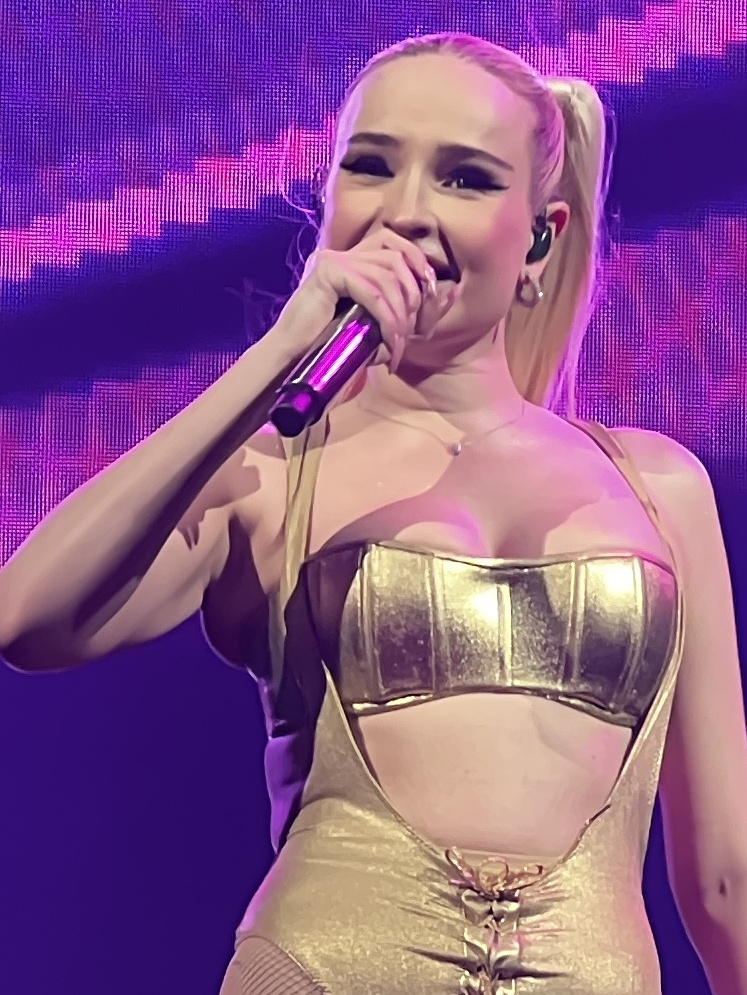
- Petras in 2024

Background information
- Born: 27 August 1992 (age 34)
- Origin: Uckerath, North Rhine-Westphalia, Germany
- Genres: Dance-pop; pop; hyperpop
- Occupations: Singer; songwriter
- Instrument: Vocals
- Works: Discography
- Years active: 2006–present
- Labels: BunHead; Amigo; Republic; AWAL
- Award: Full list
- Website: kimpetras.com

Kim Petras (Note: Pronunciation: /ˈpɛtrəs/; German: [ˈpeːtʁas]) (born 27 August 1992) is a German singer and songwriter based in Los Angeles. After gaining international media attention for transitioning as a teenager, she released her debut EP, One Piece of Tape (2011), and wrote tracks for Fergie, JoJo, Skylar Simone, and Twice. In 2017, Petras released her debut single "I Don't Want It at All", which charted at No. 54 on Billboard's Dance Club Songs chart. She followed this with her second EP, Turn Off the Light, Vol. 1 (2018), the mixtapes Clarity and Turn Off the Light (both 2019), and the single "How It's Done" (2019); the last of these featured on the soundtrack of the 2019 film Charlie's Angels. Petras was featured on Kygo's "Broken Glass" (2020), which charted at No. 13 on Billboard's Dance/Electronic Songs chart.

In 2021, Petras signed a record deal with Dr. Luke's Amigo Records and Republic Records. That year, she became the first transgender act to perform at the MTV Video Music Awards, MTV Europe Music Awards, and Macy's Thanksgiving Day Parade. Her 2022 EP, Slut Pop, featured the song "Throat Goat", which went viral in 2023 after a sign language interpreter provided an explicit translation at Sydney WorldPride. The same year, Petras collaborated with Sam Smith on "Unholy", which charted at number one in twenty countries including on the Billboard Hot 100 and won a Grammy Award for Best Pop Duo/Group Performance, making Petras the first openly transgender woman to top that chart or win a Grammy in that category.

Petras followed "Unholy" with the single "Alone" (with Nicki Minaj), which peaked at No. 55 on the chart, and preceded her debut studio album, Feed the Beast (2023), which charted at No. 44 on the Billboard 200. Her second studio album, Problématique (2023), was issued that same year, and followed with the EP, Slut Pop Miami (2024). She independently released her third studio album, Detour (2026), following her departure from Republic Records.

Petras has also released the tracks "Unlock It" (2017; with Charli XCX) and "Reminds Me" (2020), which have been covered by Piri & Tommy and by the Kid Laroi and Juice Wrld respectively, and made appearances in the films The Bitch Who Stole Christmas (2021) and This Is Me... Now: A Love Story (2024), the series Bridesman (2022), the Amazon Music documentary The Lead Up (2022), and a series two episode of RuPaul's Drag Race: UK vs. the World (2024).

== Life and career ==
=== 1992–2021: Early life and career beginnings ===
Petras was born on 27 August 1992, grew up in Uckerath, North Rhine-Westphalia, Germany, and has two older sisters. Her mother is a dancer and her father is an architect. She began identifying as female aged two and began hormone therapy aged 12. She also began writing songs around this time, having taught herself English by watching YouTube videos of English-speaking artists such as Britney Spears; her earliest works were produced on GarageBand. She has stated that her gender dysphoria left her suicidal and that she was inspired to become a musician after watching a songwriting documentary. In 2006, aged 13, she discussed her medical gender transition on an episode of Stern TV. She then made further appearances on international news in an effort to be accepted for gender-affirming surgery by age 16, two years earlier than Germany would normally allow. When she did this in 2008, outlets touted her as the "world's youngest transsexual".

While still in school, she visited recording studios unannounced and recorded demos, which prompted Universal Music Germany to sign her while she was in her teens. Part of her deal was a jingle for a detergent firm. She also released the EP One Piece of Tape in May 2011. Aged 19, with the money she had made from her jingles and a job as a waitress, she moved to Los Angeles, where she lived in the garage of a producer in Redondo Beach. Among the tracks she wrote during this period was "Bratz What's Up", which was recorded by Skylar Stecker for what would have been a sequel to the film Bratz, and a track recorded but not released by Fergie. She also booked sessions with JoJo. She signed a publishing deal with Prescription Songs in 2016 and has stated that her search for a label was hindered by religious record label employees refusing to work with a transgender act and imploring others not to. That year, she set up her own imprint, Bunhead Records.

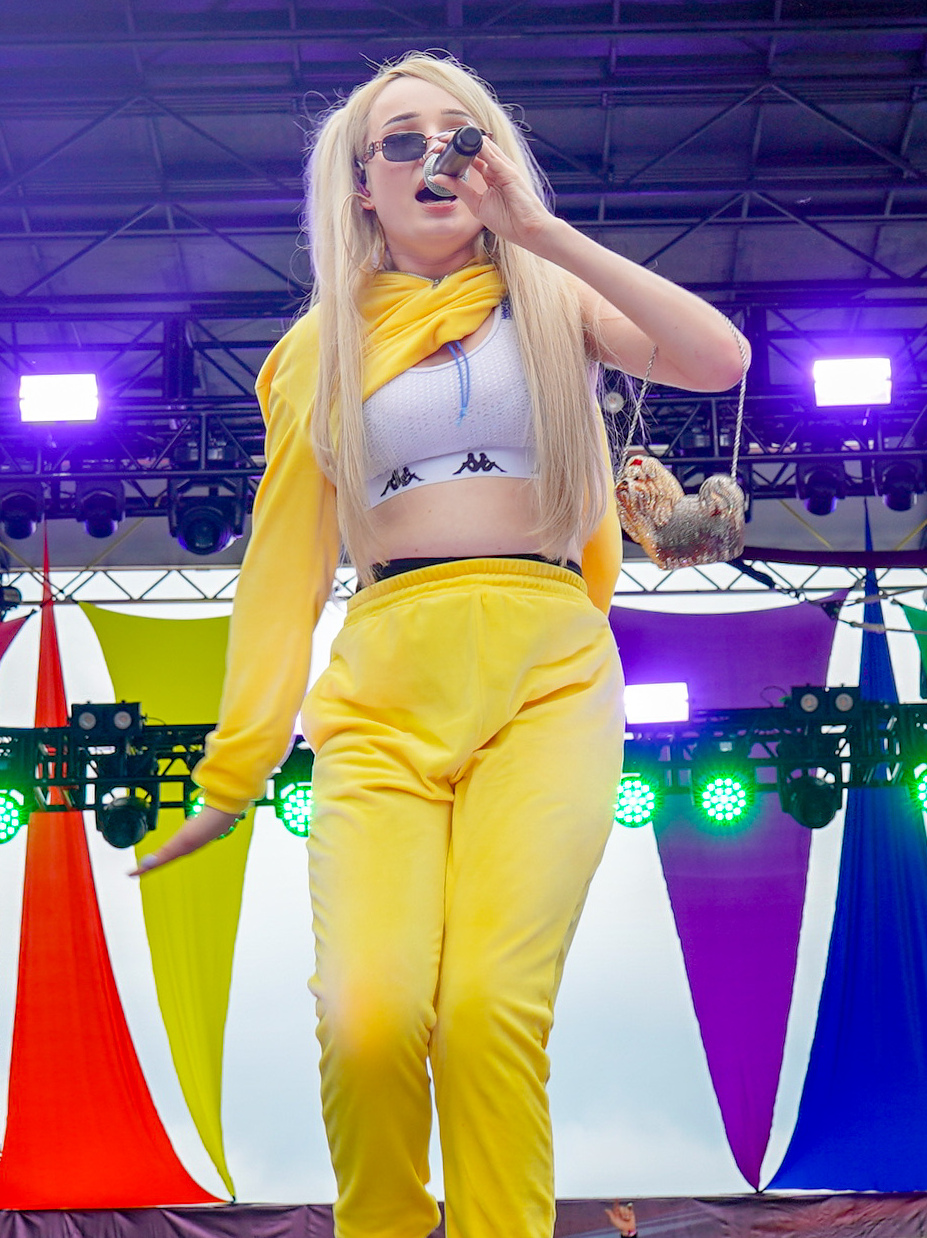
Petras performing at Capital Pride in Washington, D.C. in 2018

Petras released her debut single "I Don't Want It at All" in August 2017 and the singles "Hillside Boys" and "Hills" (featuring Baby E) in September 2017. A music video for the first was released in October and featured Paris Hilton. Petras then released "Slow It Down" in November before featuring on Charli XCX's "Unlock It" and releasing "Faded" (featuring Lil Aaron) in December; the second featured on XCX's mixtape Pop 2 that month, went viral after featuring in a TikTok trend in 2021, and was covered by Piri & Tommy in November 2022. She also released a video for "Faded" in January 2018, followed by the break-up-inspired "Heart to Break" on 14 February, which peaked at No. 52 on Billboard's Dance Club Songs chart. She followed this with the singles "Can't Do Better" and "All the Time" in June and August and the Halloween-themed EP Turn Off the Light, Vol. 1 in October. The last of these featured Petras singing in German and contained vocals from Cassandra Peterson. She had intended to release Turn Off the Light, Vol. 2 in October 2019 but instead released the mixtape Turn Off the Light then, which ended with Turn Off the Light, Vol. 1. A third instalment was announced in October 2020 but remained unreleased five years later.

In November 2018, her composition "Young & Wild" featured on Twice's EP Yes or Yes and her vocals featured on Cheat Codes' song "Feeling of Falling"; the latter charted on Billboard's Dance/Electronic Songs chart at number 23. She then released three singles in February 2019: "1, 2, 3 Dayz Up" featuring Sophie, "If U Think About Me...", and "Homework" featuring Lil Aaron. These, and her first eight singles, have been referred to by Petras as "Era 1". Between April and June 2019, Petras released the singles "Broken", "Got My Number", "Blow It All", "Sweet Spot", "All I Do Is Cry", "Do Me", "Clarity", "Personal Hell", and "Another One", followed by the album Clarity, which featured all of them. She then featured on Charli XCX's "Click" and a remix of Max Schneider's "Love Me Less" in September and teamed up with Kash Doll, Stefflon Don, and Alma in October for "How It's Done"; the last of these was recorded for the soundtrack of November's Charlie's Angels.

In February 2020, she released the single "Reminds Me", which was covered by The Kid Laroi and Juice Wrld in December 2020 to mark a year after the latter's death, and announced that she would be the supporting act on the European leg of Camila Cabello's the Romance Tour, which was aborted due to the COVID-19 pandemic. That May, Petras released the single "Malibu", which was promoted by a performance on Jimmy Kimmel Live! and later remade in Simlish for The Sims 4, and featured on the Kygo song "Broken Glass", which featured on his album Golden Hour and charted at number 13 on Billboard's Dance/Electronic Songs chart. She also added the song "Party Till I Die" to Turn Off the Light in October before featuring on K/DA's "Villain" from their EP All Out in November and remixes of Studio Killers' "Jenny" and ElyOtto's "SugarCrash!" in March and April 2021.

=== 2021–present: Republic Records ===
In August 2021, Petras signed to the Republic Records imprint Amigo Records and released "Future Starts Now". At the time, the track was intended as the lead single from her major-label debut studio album, Problématique. Her September performance of the song at that year's MTV Video Music Awards pre-show and her November 2021 performances at that year's MTV Europe Music Awards and Macy's Thanksgiving Day Parade made her the first out trans artist to perform at any of them. Her performance at the EMAs was intentionally raunchy in protest against a then-recent anti-LGBTQ law that had been passed in Hungary, where the awards were being held. Recording of Problématique was interrupted by Petras attending the 2021 Met Gala in a bright orange top in the shape of a horse's head and a matching ponytail, both of which had been designed by Hillary Taymour of Collina Strada. In December, Petras featured in the holiday film The Bitch Who Stole Christmas and released "Coconuts"; the latter had premiered at the EMAs and inspired the name of one of JoJo Siwa's cars.

Petras released Slut Pop in February 2022, an EP containing highly sexual lyrics. She has stated that she was inspired to release such content due to her own struggles with being sexual. The EP contained "Throat Goat", which went viral in March 2023 after a sign language interpreter provided an explicit translation at Sydney World Pride, and "XXX", which Petras re-recorded in Simlish for The Sims' 25th anniversary. A follow-up EP, Slut Pop Miami, was released in February 2024. She appeared in Grindr's series Bridesman in April 2022 and featured on Alex Chapman's "Horsey" the month after. During June's Pride Month, she released an Amazon Original cover of Kate Bush's "Running Up That Hill" for the occasion and used a performance at NYC Pride March to call out the then-recent overturning of Roe v. Wade. In July, Petras was the subject of the Amazon Music documentary The Lead Up and announced that Problématique had been scrapped, following which much of it leaked; a revised version was released in September 2023.

From August 2022, Sam Smith began teasing their Petras collaboration "Unholy" on TikTok, where it went viral. Upon release the following month, the song made her the first openly transgender woman to top the Billboard Hot 100, charted at number one in nineteen other countries including the UK, Ireland, Australia, Canada, and New Zealand, and made Petras the first openly transgender musician to win a Grammy Award for Best Pop Duo/Group Performance. (Note: Wendy Carlos won three Grammys in 1970 for her debut album Switched-On Bach, nine years before coming out as trans.) She followed "Unholy" in November with "If Jesus Was a Rockstar" and in January 2023 with "Brrr" and a remix of Meghan Trainor's "Made You Look". She then released "Alone" (featuring Nicki Minaj) in April, which sampled Alice Deejay's "Better Off Alone" and charted at number 55 on the Billboard Hot 100, and appeared on the cover of May's Sports Illustrated Swimsuit Issue, becoming the second trans woman to be featured. (Note: Actress Leyna Bloom appeared in July 2021.) Around this time, she made a further appearance at the Met Gala, where she advertised an off-black-and-white outfit and sequinned platform boots designed by Marc Jacobs; some people thought that her yellow vape pen was part of the outfit.

In June, she featured on a rerecording of Paris Hilton's "Stars Are Blind", a track she had covered in 2020 for a Stonewall Gives Back livestream, and released her own album Feed the Beast; the latter charted at No. 44 on the Billboard 200. She then featured on a remix of Sofía Reyes and Danna Paola's "TQUM" in July and on James Hype's "Drums" and a remix of City Girls' "Flashy" in October; the second sampled Justin Timberlake's "Like I Love You". In November 2023, Petras teamed up with David Guetta for "When We Were Young (The Logical Song)", which interpolated Supertramp's "The Logical Song". She was scheduled to craft the theme song of UEFA Euro 2024 with OneRepublic and Meduza, but was replaced with German singer Leony. She judged an episode of series two of RuPaul's Drag Race: UK vs. the World in early 2024 and booked a series of festival dates for the following summer, but cancelled them on medical advice in April and later stated that she had damaged her vocal cords during her recently-completed Feed the Beast World Tour. She featured on Sophie's single "Reason Why" in June and on the Chainsmokers' single "Don't Lie" and Katy Perry's song "Gorgeous" in September; the first and third appeared on Sophie's self-titled posthumous album and on Perry's album 143 that month.

Petras released "Polo" and "Freak It" in July 2025, featured on Frost Children's Sister album track "Radio" in September, and released "I Like Ur Look" in October. She requested to be dropped from Republic in January for allegedly refusing to give her a date for her album and withholding payment to collaborators, following which she independently released the songs "Pop Sound", "Mr. Producer" (featuring BC Kingdom), "Cha Cha", and "Get Some" (featuring Cortisa Star) weekly from February. These songs – collectively known as the EP Pretour – were released on SoundCloud and YouTube and did not appear on major streaming sites. Detour and its singles "Need for Speed" and "Jeep", were released in May, April, and May; the last featured Porches. A deluxe version released in September was promoted with a music video for "Autobahn".

== Artistry and public image ==
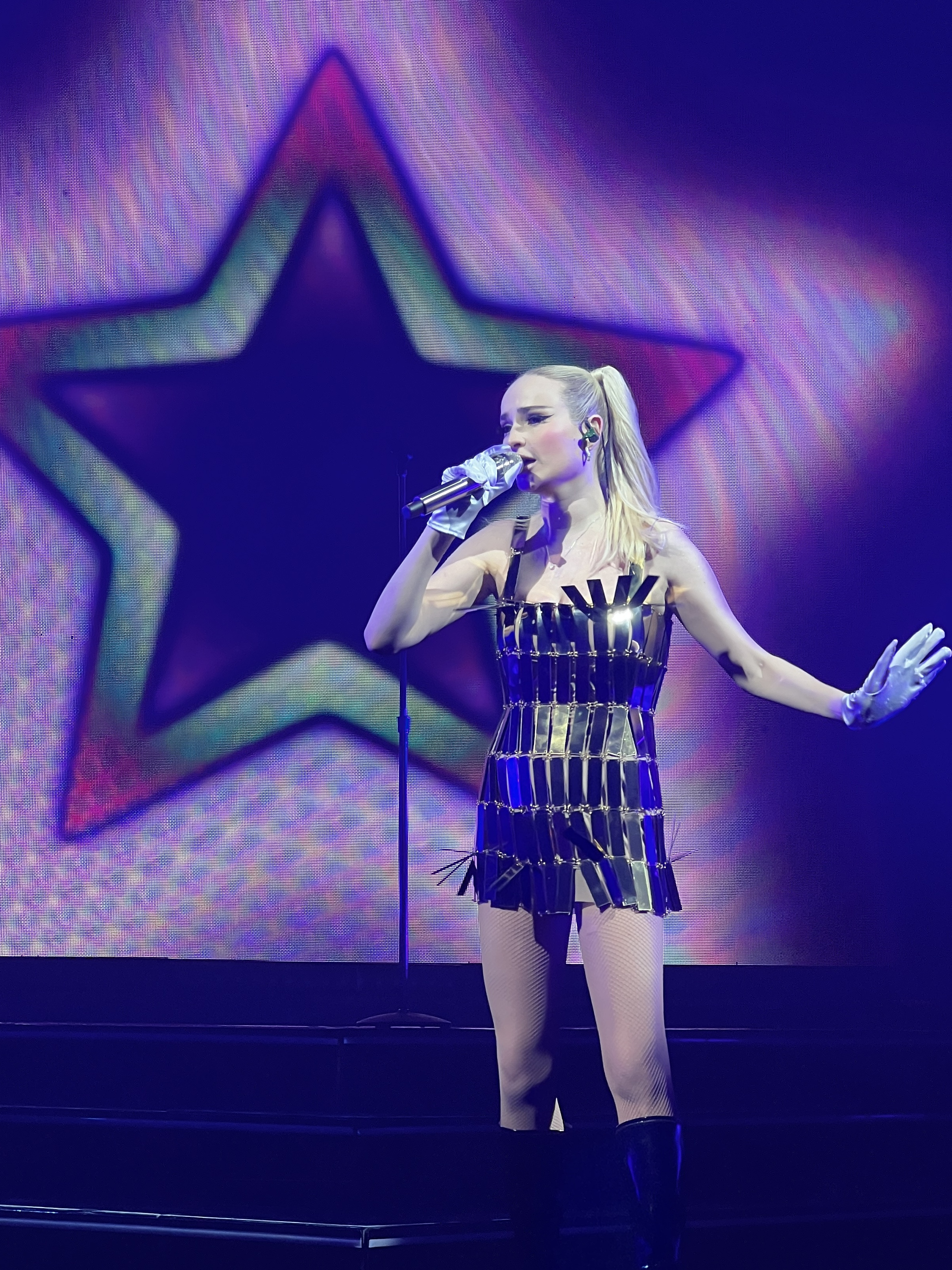
Petras performing on her Feed the Beast World Tour in 2024

Petras's works often make use of the producer tag "Woo Ah!" and are generally genre-agnostic with the exception of Turn Off the Light, which was made to sound like a horror soundtrack. She has cited Cher, Madonna, Britney Spears, Kylie Minogue, and Sophie as influences. Her fans call themselves Bunheads in reference to both her love for the show Sailor Moon and a sideways-bun hairstyle she used to wear.

Petras worked with Dr. Luke, the founder of Prescription Songs, on her solo releases between "I Don't Want It At All" (2017) and 2022, and then on Problématique and Slut Pop Miami. She defended working with Dr. Luke, who in 2014 was accused of abusing Kesha, in interviews with Out (2017), NME (2018), and BuzzFeed News (2021), and in tweets in 2018 and 2022. She apologised after her 2018 interview implied that he was not an abuser of women. Following the release of Slut Pop, #FreeKesha trended on Twitter and fans criticised a lyric in "Throat Goat" that referenced sexual assault survivor Lady Gaga. In 2026, after Petras posted about her issues with Republic Records, Kesha expressed support for her.

== Discography ==
Studio albums

- Feed the Beast (2023)
- Problématique (2023)
- Detour (2026)

== Tours ==
Headlining

- Broken Tour (2019)
- Clarity Tour (2019–2020)
- Feed the Beast World Tour (2023–2024)
- De-Tour (2026)

Supporting

- Troye Sivan – The Bloom Tour (2018)

== Awards and nominations ==
List of awards and nominations
Award	Year	Nominee(s)	Category	Result	Ref.
Brit Awards	2023	"Unholy" (with Sam Smith)	Song of the Year	Nominated	
British LGBT Awards	2021	Herself	Music Artist	Nominated	
British LGBT Awards	2024	Herself	Music Artist	Nominated	
GLAAD Media Awards	2019	Turn Off the Light, Vol. 1	Outstanding Music Artist	Nominated	
GLAAD Media Awards	2020	Clarity	Outstanding Music Artist	Nominated	
GLAAD Media Awards	2023	Slut Pop	Outstanding Music Artist	Nominated	
GLAAD Media Awards	2024	Feed the Beast and Problématique	Outstanding Music Artist	Nominated	
Grammy Awards	2023	"Unholy" (with Sam Smith)	Best Pop Duo/Group Performance	Won	
iHeartRadio Music Awards	2023	"Unholy" (with Sam Smith)	Best Collaboration	Won	
iHeartRadio Music Awards	2023	"Unholy" (with Sam Smith)	TikTok Bop of the Year	Nominated	
MTV Europe Music Awards	2022	"Unholy" (with Sam Smith)	Video for Good	Won	
MTV Video Music Awards Japan	2023	"Unholy" (with Sam Smith)	Best Collaboration Video (International)	Won	
Queerty Awards	2020	Herself	Badass	Nominated	
Queerty Awards	2020	"Sweet Spot"	Anthem	Nominated	
Queerty Awards	2021	"Malibu"	Anthem	Nominated	
Queerty Awards	2022	"Coconuts"	Anthem	Nominated	
Queerty Awards	2023	"Unholy" (with Sam Smith)	Anthem	Won	
