= Problématique =

2023 studio album by Kim Petras

Studio album by Kim Petras
- Released: 18 September 2023
- Recorded: 2020–2021
- Genre: Dance-pop; dance; disco
- Length: 29:40
- Label: Amigo; Republic
- Producer: Dr. Luke; Aaron Joseph; Vaughn Oliver

Kim Petras chronology
Feed the Beast (2023)	Problématique (2023)	Slut Pop Miami (2024)

Problématique is the second studio album by German singer Kim Petras. It was surprise-released on 18 September 2023, through Amigo and Republic Records. Originally planned to be her debut studio album, it faced multiple delays and was initially cancelled in 2022 due to the label's decision to favour Feed the Beast (2023).

Problématique is a dance-pop album that mainly explores themes of love and sex, heavily rooted in the premise of escapism, as the singer conceived the project during the COVID-19 lockdown. Petras described the music as "very European" and "front to back pop", also experimenting with disco, French house and German techno for the songs.

The singles, "Future Starts Now" and "Coconuts", were released in 2021 to promote Problématique. Following its initial cancellation, the latter was included on Feed the Beast, while the former was ultimately scrapped from the album's final tracklist. Problématique received generally positive reviews upon its release; most critics found the album catchy and entertaining, and lamented its initial shelving, calling it a "missed opportunity".

== Background and release ==
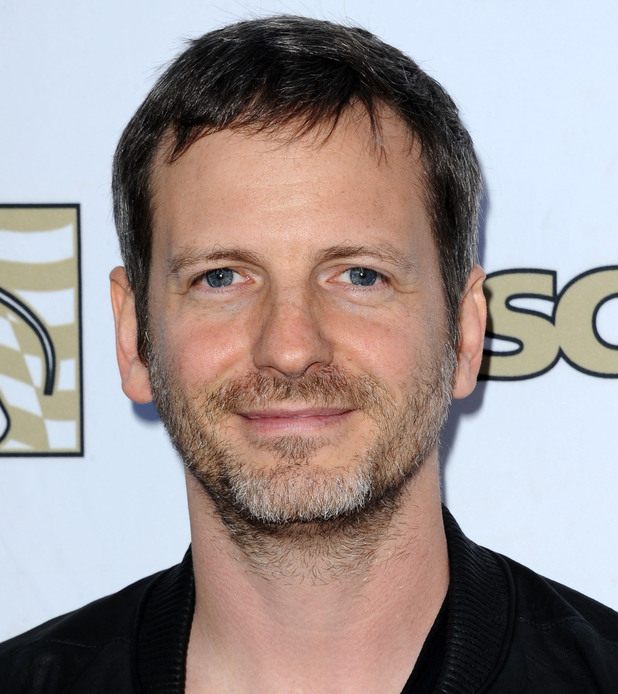
Petras suggested the album was stalled by record producer and songwriter Dr. Luke (pictured in 2014), who owns Republic Records imprint Amigo Records.

Between July and August 2022, Petras addressed rumours about the album's release on social media. She suggested the project was stalled by Amigo Records after a fan tweeted "R.I.P. PROBLÉMATIQUE! Please leave your flowers in the comments" along with a photoshopped image of a gravestone mentioning the album's title and lead single. Petras responded, with rose emoji, that she did not mind if her fans listened to the leaked songs. She was unable to release new music and described herself as "devastated", adding that the situation made her want to quit. In later tweets, she clarified that nothing had been scrapped but that she had not received approval to release any material, leaving the project in "limbo". Petras also told her fans she hoped they would enjoy the songs, explaining that they had been made for them.

In November 2022, Petras said of the project had been created during the COVID-19 lockdown as a form of escapism. She described Problématique as a "super Euro-pop, gay pop explosion" that she loved and was proud of, but added that she ultimately felt the time had come to pursue "something different". She later told People that after signing with Republic Records and working with new collaborators, she felt she had "new things to say" musically. She also said she wanted to change direction and had grown tired of making club-oriented songs, particularly after Slut Pop, around the time Problématique leaked.

Following her September 2022 release of "Unholy" with Sam Smith, Petras said in 2023 that the period had been "rough" for her. She explained that Problématique had recently leaked and was effectively scrapped, and that she had only recently signed with Republic Records, which led to pressure to develop a new album while the timing of her next release remained uncertain. After the album's initial scrapping, Petras released her debut studio album, Feed the Beast, in June 2023. Problématique was surprise-released on 18 September, due to "overwhelming 'fan demand'".

== Recording ==
Approximately 80 songs were considered for Problématique. Petras worked with producers Alex Chapman and Aaron Joseph in Laurel Canyon, Los Angeles. In late 2021, Hilton Dresden of Paper wrote, "But this year alone, amidst a raging pandemic, has seen [Petras] complete an 18-track album — her longest and, based on our conversation, the pop star's favorite body of work ever." In an interview with Dresden, Petras said of the album:

"... it's 18 songs, so it's the longest album I've ever made. Everything is very uptempo. It's all inspired by different genres of dance music, or electronic music, or EDM, techno. It's hard to talk about because every song is completely different from each other, but when you put them all together they make an experience, which I love."

== Composition ==
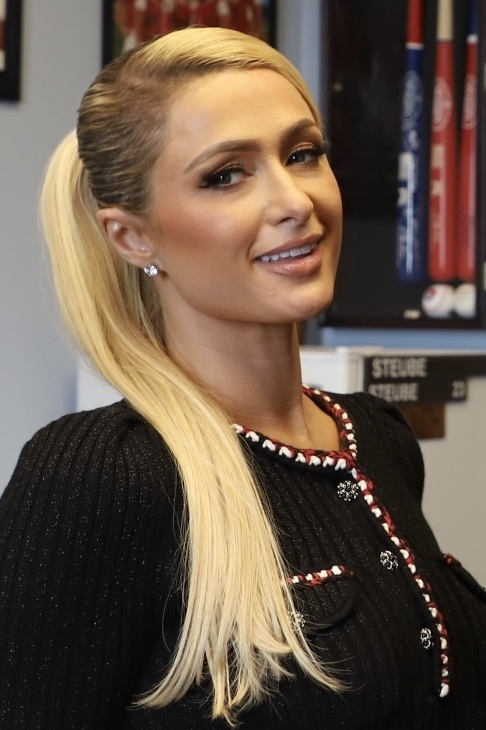
Paris Hilton (pictured in 2021) is featured on "All She Wants".

Problématique is a dance-pop and dance record, featuring French house inspired elements; Jeff Nelson from People concluded that its result is "pure disco heaven". According to Atwood Magazine's Julia Dzurillay, the album's title is "a nod to her French-inspired lyrics that also poked fun at her 'problematic' work relationship with producer Dr. Luke". The record contains "tongue-in-cheek lyrics" and "camp delivery" elements, according to Nelson. Composed of ten tracks, the album's track list shared by Joseph in 2021 indicated that the early configuration of Problématique contained several songs that were later issued on Feed the Beast in June, including "Revelations", "Coconuts", and "Hit It from the Back". The eventual version of the album also omits "Future Starts Now", which had previously been planned as its lead single.

The start of the title track has someone asking their friend if they listen to Kim Petras. Other songs include "Je T'Adore" and "All She Wants" featuring Paris Hilton; Hilton described the latter song as a "sick song", saying thay she was "obsessed" with it. Dr. Luke, Aaron Joseph, and Vaughn Oliver co-produced the songs including "All She Wants", such as "Born Again", "Something About U", and "Dirty Things".

== Promotion ==
In August 2021, Petras teased the album's lead single, "Future Starts Now", with the video clip and caption "U little baguettes ready?". Inspired by France, it was released on August 27. In December 2022, she debuted "Coconuts" and "Hit It from the Back" at the 2021 MTV Europe Music Awards, becoming the first trans artist to perform at the award show. According to People's Jack Irvin, "Coconuts" was released in December 2021 for the viral success, and "Hit It from the Back" became available to pre-save at Petras' website without a release date. They were later included on Petras' debut album, Feed the Beast.

In August 2022, Hilton confirmed her collaboration on "All She Wants". Sending Petras birthday wishes on social media, Hilton wrote, "Happy Birthday sis. Love you so much! So f---ing proud of you! Keep Sliving! So excited for our new song". The end of her post included a hashtag of the song's title.

== Critical reception ==
Professional ratings
Review scores
Source	Rating
Clash	7/10
DIY	3/5 stars

In a positive review, Robin Murray from Clash classified Problématique as "ridiculously entertaining" and a "perfect kiss off to [our] collective summer", praising most of the songs, while being more critical of some others, such as "Treat Me Like a Ho". Writing for DIY, Otis Robinson called the album a "course-correction" for Petras and stated that her "clubby hooks remain ecstatic", but thought the project felt "chained to its history without a proper roll-out".

Following the initial scrapping of the album, Harry Brocklehurst of The Tab wrote, "Problematique getting shelved is a horrific loss to the pop universe, and I will never forgive Kim's label for doing this era the injustice that it has. I hope one day the record surfaces on streaming. 'Future Starts Now' should be taught in lead single class at music school til the end of time."

== Track listing ==
All tracks are produced by Dr. Luke, Vaughn Oliver, and Aaron Joseph, except where noted.

Problématique track listing
No.	Title	Writer(s)	Length
1.	"Problématique"	Kim Petras; Aaron Joseph; Lukasz Gottwald; Vaughn Oliver; Alex Chapman; Chloe Angelides	3:03
2.	"Je T'Adore"	Petras; Joseph; Gottwald; Oliver; Chapman; Kelly Sheehan	3:05
3.	"All She Wants" (featuring Paris Hilton)	Petras; Hilton; Joseph; Gottwald; Oliver; Chapman; Aaron Jennings	3:52
4.	"Born Again"	Petras; Joseph; Gottwald; Oliver; Chapman; Angelides	2:52
5.	"Something About U"	Petras; Joseph; Gottwald; Oliver; Chapman	3:01
6.	"Treat Me Like a Ho"	Petras; Joseph; Gottwald; Rocco Valdes; Ryan Ogren	1:55
7.	"Confession"	Petras; Joseph; Gottwald; Oliver; Jennings	2:51
8.	"Deeper"	Petras; Joseph; Gottwald; Oliver; Chapman; Eric Cross	2:55
9.	"Dirty Things"	Petras; Joseph; Gottwald; Oliver; Angelides	3:35
10.	"Love Ya Leave Ya"	Petras; Joseph; Gottwald; Oliver	2:26
Total length:			29:40

== Personnel ==
- Dale Becker – mastering
- Serban Ghenea – mixing
- Clint Gibbs – engineering
- Kalani Thompson – engineering
- Tyler Sheppard – engineering
- Katie Harvey – mastering assistance
- Noah McCorkle – mastering assistance
- Bryce Bordone – mixing assistance
- Grant Horton – engineering assistance
- Ashlee Gibbs – production coordination
- Steven Klein – cover photography

== Charts ==
Chart performance
Chart (2023)	Peak position
UK Album Downloads (OCC)	69
US Top Dance Albums (Billboard)	8

== Release history ==
Release history and formats
Region	Date	Format(s)	Label(s)	Ref.
Various	18 September 2023	Digital download; streaming	Amigo; Republic	
Various	24 November 2023	LP	Amigo; Republic	
