= All I Do Is Cry =

Promotional single by Kim Petras

from the album Clarity
- Released: 23 May 2019
- Genre: Trap-pop
- Length: 3:23
- Label: BunHead; Amigo Records; Republic Records
- Songwriters: Kim Petras; Lukasz Gottwald; Aaron Joseph; Nicholas Balding
- Producers: Made in China; Aaron Joseph

"All I Do Is Cry" is a song by German singer Kim Petras from her debut mixtape Clarity (2019). It was released on 23 May 2019, as the project's fifth weekly promotional single. First released via BunHead Records, it was re-released again two years later on streaming services with a changed date of 2021 under Amigo and Republic Records. Petras released this song among others from the same album in preparation for the Broken Tour.

== Reception ==
Rolling Stone commented on how the track differed from her previous singles: "Kim Petras veers into moody trap-pop with her new song “All I Do Is Cry.” The singer-songwriter vents about heartbreak throughout the track, which — in contrast to her other, more club-friendly singles — recalls the emo-rap vibe of Juice WRLD". Reviewing it for Interview Magazine, Ernest Macias suggested the song "takes her music to a sad, almost emo direction, laced with trap beats and lyrics bemoaning a broken heart." For Nick Levine in NME, the song "shows her vulnerable side." Writing for The Guardian, Aimee Cliff described the song as "deliciously tragic", while Stephen Daw of Billboard called it "heartbreaking-and-catchy."

== Track listing ==
Digital download
No.	Title	Length
1.	"All I Do Is Cry"	3:23

== Credits and personnel ==
- Written by Kim Petras, Lukasz Gottwald, Aaron Joseph and Nicholas Balding
- Produced by Made in China and Aaron Joseph
- Vocals by Kim Petras

== Release history ==
Region	Date	Format	Label
Various	23 May 2019	Digital download; streaming	BunHead
