= Turn Out the Lights =

Turn Out the Lights may refer to:

- Turn Out the Lights (TV series), a British television sitcom
- Turn out the lights, the party's over-- lines of a song sung often by Don Meredith, a color commentator covering National Football League
- Turn Out the Lights (album), an album by American singer-songwriter Julien Baker.

== See also ==
- Turn the Lights Out (disambiguation)
- Turn Off the Lights, a song by Teddy Pendergrass
