= Turn the Lights Out =

Turn the Lights Out may refer to:

- Turn the Lights Out (album), a 2007 album by The Ponys, or the title track
- "Turn the Lights Out" (song), a 2009 song by Hadouken!

== See also ==
- Turn the Lights Off
