= Lil Aaron =

American singer (born 1994)

- Born: Aaron Jennings Puckett; May 31, 1994 (age 32); Frankfort, Indiana, U.S.
- Origin: Los Angeles, California, U.S.
- Genres: Rap rock; emo rap; alternative hip hop; pop
- Occupations: Singer; rapper; songwriter
- Instruments: Vocals; guitar
- Years active: 2016–present
- Label: HazHeart
- Member of: Boyfriendz

Aaron Jennings Puckett (born May 31, 1994), known professionally as Lil Aaron (stylized as lil aaron), is an American singer, rapper, and songwriter from Goshen, Indiana. Merging elements of pop punk and emo with hip hop and pop, he has released five solo EPs, as well as two EPs as a member of the alternative hip hop collective Boyfriendz. He has also written songs for artists such as Kim Petras, Blackbear, Liam Payne, Hailee Steinfeld, Dev and Kiiara. He took part in the writing of Lizzo's 2019 album Cuz I Love You, which won a Grammy Award for Best Urban Contemporary Album.

== Early life ==
Puckett grew up in Goshen, Indiana. His older brother, Kora Puckett, is also a musician, playing in rock band Narrow Head. As a child, his Christian parents didn't allow him to listen to secular music, however he eventually became a fan of secular punk rock and emo bands through websites such as MySpace and PureVolume, without his parents knowing. First he discovered groups likes Never Shout Never, Owl City and The Ready Set, before becoming a fan of bands like Hit the Lights and Boys Like Girls. Looking back in adulthood, he has stated "I’ve been emo my whole fucking life". In middle school and high school, he was the vocalist of a pop punk band that was influenced by Hit the Lights and Metro Station and used overt auto-tune. As he grew older, Puckett became increasingly interested in the independent hip hop scene that was coalescing on the internet. This led to him dropping out of high school and moving to Los Angeles.

== Career ==
Puckett began his career as a songwriter, working with artists such as Travis Mills, DRAM, Icona Pop and Kiiara. However, he soon wished to perform the tracks he was writing himself, beginning a solo-career in 2016 with the "Damn" produced by Y2K. On April 10, he was featured on the Travis Mills song "Trouble". On June 23, he released the track Prolly featuring Ilovemakonnen. On September 22, he was featured on the Joy song "Birthday". For his debut EP Gloing Pain$, he enlisted the members of Polyphia to record the instrumentals. Puckett's music first began gaining attention in mid-2017, through songs "Hot Topic" and "Warped Tour" that made references to cornerstones of pop punk and emo culture, namely Hot Topic and Warped Tour, and through sampling bands like Paramore and Panic! at the Disco. In late 2017, Puckett formed the group Boyfriendz, with Smrtdeath and Lil Lotus. They released their debut self-titled EP in December 2017. The EP was recorded in a single night and was released within a week through SoundCloud. In 2017, Puckett began working with Dr Luke and signed to his production company Prescription Songs. He was later featured on the song "Faded" by Kim Petras. A music video was released for the track in January 2018.

He featured on Goody Grace's song "In The Light Of The Moon", which was a part of the Infinite EP, released March 22, 2018. On May 31, he released the EP Rock$tar Famou$. The recording process for the EP was split between Kauai, Hawaii, and Hollywood, California. On May 11, the EP's track "Quit" featuring Travis Barker was released accompanied by a music video. On September 5, a music video was released for the EP's song "Anymore" featuring Kim Petras. On November 16 and 17, Puckett opened for Blink-182 during their concert at the Pearl Theater in Las Vegas. He featured on Brooke Candy's song "Nuts", which was released on November 16.

On December 7, 2018, he released a Christmas EP titled Worst Christmas Ever. On December 29, he released the song "Studded Gucci Belt", which samples "Shake It" by Metro Station was accompanied by a music video featuring clips from the videos for "Welcome To The Black Parade", "I'm Not Okay (I Promise)", "I Write Sins Not Tragedies", "Misery Business", "Adam's Song" and "the Anthem". On January 25, 2019, he released the EP Dark Matter. Puckett was featured on Kim Petras' song "Homework" which was released on February 7. On February 14, Boyfriendz released their second EP BFZ2. He featured on Big Baby Scumbag's song "Dale Earnhardt (remix)", from the album Big Baby Earnhardt released January 17, 2020. Puckett was featured on Big Freedia's song "GTFOMF", from the EP Louder released March 13. He was featured on the track by Plavtinum titled "Girls on the Internet", which was release March 20. He was featured on the songs "Lights Off" and "She Told me to the Kill Myself" by Smrtdeath, which were released on the album Somethjng's Wrong on November 13, 2020. On October 6, 2020, he released his EP 808 Rock. He was featured on the song "Michelle Pfeiffer" by Ethel Cain, which was released on Feb 11, 2021.

== Musical style ==
Puckett's music had been categorised as emo rap and rap rock. It includes elements of pop punk, SoundCloud rap and pop. Alternative Press called his music "genre-defying".

He has cited influences including Panic! at the Disco, Blink-182, Brokencyde and Dot Dot Curve. In an interview with Projectu.TV, he stated that his goal was to appeal to both "the kids who listened to A$AP, Cudi and Kanye and the kids who listened to Black Veil Brides, Blood On The Dance Floor, the Warped Tour kind of music". His music often merges trap instrumentals with autotuned and distorted vocals using melodies reminiscent of pop punk and emo. Complex writer Joe Price described his sound as "Travis Scott meets Green Day". Pitchfork writer Jayson Greene described it as "sampl[ing] Panic! At the Disco, alternately whining like Blink’s Tom DeLonge and warbling like, well, Chief Keef over 808 claps. It’s all mixed together and atomized, a fever dream of Adidas tracksuits and dreads and emo power ballads". Hypefresh.co described his music as "mixing pop-punk attitude with the new genre of autotuned rap".

His music was cited as an influence by Yungblud for his album Weird!.

== Discography ==
=== Extended plays ===
Title	EP details
Gloing Pain$	Released: October 31, 2016; Format: Digital download, streaming
Rock$tar Famou$	Released: May 31, 2017; Label: Hazheart Records; Format: Digital download, streaming
Worst Christmas Ever	Released: December 7, 2018; Label: Hazheart Records; Format: Digital download, streaming
Dark Matter	Released: January 25, 2019; Label: Hazheart Records; Format: Digital download, streaming
808 Rock	Released: October 6, 2020; Label: Hazheart Records; Format: Digital download, streaming
American Scumbag	Released: June 28, 2024; Label: Hazheart Records; Format: Digital download, streaming

=== Singles ===
==== As lead artist ====
Title	Year	Album
"Quit" (featuring Travis Barker)	2018	Rock$tar Famou$
"Dark Matter"	2019	Dark Matter
"Vans Untied"	2020	808 Rock
"That One Song"(featuring Lil Lotus)	2021	Non-album single
"Pretty Little Breakdown" (featuring Smrtdeath)	2021	Non-album single

==== As featured artist ====
Title	Artist	Year
"Trouble"	Travis Mills	2016
"Birthday"	Joy.	2016
"Faded"	Kim Petras	2017
"In the Light of the Moon"	Goody Grace	2018
"Nuts"	Brooke Candy	2018
"Love Nightmare"	Macho Randy	2018
"Homework"	Kim Petras	2019
"Dale Earnhardt (remix)"	Big Baby Scumbag	2020
"GTFOMF"	Big Freedia	2020
"Girls On The Internet"	Plvtinum	2020
"Lights Off"	Smrtdeath	2020
"She Told Me to Kill Myself"	Smrtdeath	2020
"Michelle Pfeiffer"	Ethel Cain	2021
"Bleach (On the Rocks) {lil aaron remix}"	John Harvie	2021
"HMU"	Ocean Grove	2022
"Walk Away"	Oni	2024

=== With Boyfriendz ===
Title	EP details
Boyfriendz	Released: December 6, 2017; Label: Independent; Format: Digital download, streaming
BFZ2	Released: February 14, 2019; Label: Independent; Format: Digital download, streaming

=== Songwriting credits ===
Title	Year	Artist(s)	Album	Written with
"Fragile" (featuring Hailee Steinfeld)	2016	Prince Fox	Haiz (Japan deluxe edition)	Prince Fox, Jordan Palmer, Jordan Humphries
"Weekend" (featuring Icona Pop)	2016	Louis the Child	Non-album single	Louis the Child, Icona Pop, Imad Royal, Blaise Railey
"#1" (featuring Nef the Pharaoh)	2016	Dev	Non-album single	Dev, Nef the Pharaoh
"Coconut Oil"	2016	Lizzo	Coconut Oil	Lizzo, Ricky Reed
"Church"	2017	Chase Atlantic	Part One	Mitchel Cave, Christian Anthony, Clinton Cave
"All Night"	2017	Big Boi	Boomiverse	Big Boi, Dr. Luke, Cirkut, Griffin Oskar, Chloe Angelides
"I Don't Want It at All"	2017	Kim Petras	Non-album single	Kim Petras, Dr. Luke, Cirkut, Aaron Joseph
"Intro (Slow)"	2017	Quinn XCII	The Story of Us	Quinn XCII, David Gamson
"Bedroom Floor"	2017	Liam Payne	LP1	Liam Payne, Charlie Puth, Jacob Kasher, Ammar Malik, Noel Zancanella, Steve Mac
"Up in This" (featuring Tinashe)	2017	blackbear	cybersex	blackbear, Tinashe, Starrah, JUDGE, Wax Motif
"Boys"	2018	Lizzo	Cuz I Love You	Lizzo, Ricky Reed, Nate Mercereau
"Feeling of Falling" (featuring Kim Petras)	2018	Cheat Codes	Non-album single	Cheat Codes, Sean Myer, Ivy Adara
"Animal"	2019	Fever 333	Strength in Numb333rs	Jason Aalon Butler, John Feldmann, Travis Barker, Zakk Cervini
"1, 2, 3 Dayz Up" (featuring Sophie)	2019	Kim Petras	Non-album single	Kim Petras, Aaron Joseph, Dr. Luke, Sophie
"Clarity"	2019	Kim Petras	Clarity	Kim Petras, Dr. Luke, Aaron Joseph, B Ham
"Got My Number"	2019	Kim Petras	Clarity	Kim Petras, Dr. Luke, Aaron Joseph, Jussifer
"Meet the Parents"	2019	Kim Petras	Clarity	Kim Petras, Dr. Luke, Aaron Joseph
"Shinin'"	2019	Kim Petras	Clarity	Kim Petras, Dr. Luke, Aaron Joseph, Theron Thomas
"Death by Sex"	2019	Kim Petras	Turn Off the Light	Kim Petras, Dr. Luke, Aaron Joseph, B Ham
"Reckless"	2019	Spencer Barnett	Reckless	Spencer Barnett, Digi, Hoskins, Sam Fischer
"Suicide Note"	2019	Spencer Barnett	Reckless	Spencer Barnett, Digi, Hoskins, Sam Fischer
"Leaving"	2019	Spencer Barnett	Reckless	Spencer Barnett, Hoskins
"17"	2019	Spencer Barnett	Reckless	Spencer Barnett, Sam Fischer, Hoskins
"Come to Brazil"	2019	Why Don't We	Non-album single	Why Don't We, Jacob Kasher, Jakkyboi, Smrtdeath, The Futuristics, 94Skrt
"Goodbye 2 Heartbreak"	2019	Vic Mensa & 93PUNX	93PUNX	Vic Mensa, Dru DeCaro, Johan Lenox, Wil Anspach, Travis Barker
"Not Another Christmas Song"	2019	Blink-182	Non-album single	Mark Hoppus, Travis Barker, Matt Skiba, Matt Malpass, JP Clark, Mike Skwark
"People You Know"	2020	Selena Gomez	Rare	Selena Gomez, Jason Evigan, Alex Hope, Steph Jones, Billboard
"No Service in the Hills" (featuring Blackbear, PRINCE$$ ROSIE & Trippie Redd)	2020	Cheat Codes	Hellraisers, Part 2	Cheat Codes, Blackbear, PRINCE$$ ROSIE, Trippie Redd, Jonas Jeberg, Neil Ormandy
"No Time" (featuring Dvbbs, PRINCE$$ ROSIE & Wiz Khalifa)	2020	Cheat Codes	Non-album single	Cheat Codes, Dvbbs, PRINCE$$ ROSIE, Wiz Khalifa, Daniel Blume, David Charles Fischer, Joris Mur
"Gravity's Rainbow"	2020	The Used	Heartwork	The Used, John Feldmann, Rachel West
"Party Till I Die"	2020	Kim Petras	Turn Off the Light	Kim Petras, Aaron Joseph, Dr. Luke, Vaughn Oliver, Alex Chapman
"No Chill" (featuring Lil Xxel)	2021	Cheat Codes	Non-album single	Cheat Codes, Lil Xxel, Benny Mayne, Daniel Penney, Joris Mur, Kyle Reynolds, Matt Elifritz
"Demons"	2021	Escape the Fate	Chemical Warfare	Escape the Fate, John Feldmann
"Romantic Disaster" (featuring Chrissy Costanza)	2021	Lil Lotus	Errør Bøy	Lil Lotus, Chrissy Costanza, John Feldmann
"Wanna Be" (featuring Machine Gun Kelly)	2021	Jxdn	Tell Me About Tomorrow	Jxdn, Machine Gun Kelly, Travis Barker
"Future Starts Now"	2021	Kim Petras	Non-album single	Kim Petras, Aaron Joseph, Alex Chapman, Dr. Luke, Vaughn Oliver
"Coconuts"	2021	Kim Petras	Feed the Beast	Kim Petras, Cedric de Saint-Rome, Rocco Did It Again!, Ryan Ogren, Dr. Luke, Vaughn Oliver, Aaron Joseph
"Icy Chain"	2021	Saweetie	Pretty Bitch Music	Saweetie, Rocco Did It Again!, Dr. Luke, SupaKaine
"Anxiety"	2022	Coi Leray	Trendsetter	Coi Leray, Lourdiz, Rocco Did It Again!, Ryan Ogren, Dr. Luke
"Slut Pop"	2022	Kim Petras	Slut Pop	Kim Petras, Rocco Did It Again!, Ryan Ogren, Dr. Luke, Aaron Joseph
"Treat Me like a Slut"	2022	Kim Petras	Slut Pop	Kim Petras, Rocco Did It Again!, Dr. Luke, Aaron Joseph
"Rich Kids Ruin Everything"	2022	Mod Sun	TBA	Mod Sun, John Feldmann
"Skin of My Teeth"	2022	Demi Lovato	Holy Fvck	Demi Lovato, Oak Felder, Alex Nice, Keith Sorrells, Laura Veltz
"Heaven"	2022	Demi Lovato	Holy Fvck	Demi Lovato, Oak Felder, Alex Nice, Keith Sorrells, Laura Veltz
"Wet Dream"	2024	Snow Wife	TBA	Atlgrandma, Snow Leann
"Live Fast Die Slow"	2026	Taeyang	Quintessence	Taeyang, Kaine, Teddy Park, Vince, Dominsuk
"Hit 'Em"	2026	Meovv	Bite Now	Dr. Luke, Theron Thomas, Shalailai
"Ddi Ro Ri"	2026	Meovv	Bite Now	Teddy Park, Narin, Ella, Gawon, Kaine, 24, Kush, Vince, Dominsuk, Zikai, DCF
"BiiiG"	2026	BigBang	Non-album single	G-Dragon, Kaine, Kush, Ido, Tarzzan, 24, Teddy Park

== Filmography ==
Year	Title	Role	Ref.
2021	Downfalls High	Background dancer	
