= Feeling of Falling =

2018 single by Cheat Codes and Kim Petras

Single by Cheat Codes and Kim Petras
- Released: 30 November 2018
- Length: 3:36
- Label: Too Easy; 300 Entertainment
- Songwriters: Ivy Adara; Trevor Dahl; Matthew Elifritz; Aaron Jennings; Sean Myer; Kevin Pederson
- Producer: Trevor Dahl

Cheat Codes singles chronology
"Home" (2018)	"Feeling of Falling" (2018)	"Ferrari" (2019)

Kim Petras singles chronology
"All the Time" (2018)	"Feeling of Falling" (2018)	"If U Think About Me..." (2019)

"Feeling of Falling" is a single by American DJ group Cheat Codes and German singer Kim Petras, released on November 30, 2018. The track was written by Ivy Adara, Trevor Dahl, Matthew Elifritz, Aaron Jennings, Sean Myer, and Kevin Pederson, and produced by Dahl.

== Background and composition ==
Unlike her previous records, Petras did not co-write "Feeling of Falling". While reflecting on the record, Petras stated “I’m the biggest emo so I really connected to the song! Cheat Codes are amazing and I’ve had the best time collaborating on this one."

According to a June 4, 2019 post from Petras on Twitter, the music video was scrapped.

== Track listing ==
Digital download
No.	Title	Length
1.	"Feeling of Falling"	3:36

Digital download – Remixes EP
No.	Title	Length
1.	"Feeling of Falling" (Steve Aoki Remix)	4:15
2.	"Feeling of Falling" (Danny Quest Remix)	2:56
3.	"Feeling of Falling" (Angemi Remix)	3:14
4.	"Feeling of Falling" (Justin Caruso Remix)	3:42
5.	"Feeling of Falling" (Daniel Blume Remix)	3:02

== Charts ==
Chart (2018)	Peak position
US Dance/Electronic Digital Song Sales (Billboard)	4
US Hot Dance/Electronic Songs (Billboard)	23
