= Malibu (Kim Petras song) =

2020 single by Kim Petras

Single by Kim Petras
- Released: 7 May 2020
- Genre: Bubblegum pop; disco; funk
- Length: 3:10
- Label: Bunhead
- Songwriters: Aaron Joseph; Allan Grigg; Jon Castelli; Kim Petras; Lukasz Gottwald; Sophia Black; Vaughn Oliver
- Producers: Aaron Joseph; Jon Castelli; Kool Kojak; Made in China; Vaughn Oliver

Kim Petras singles chronology
"Reminds Me" (2020)	"Malibu" (2020)	"Future Starts Now" (2021)

"Malibu" is a song by German singer Kim Petras. It was released as a stand-alone single on 7 May 2020.

== Background and release ==
On 1 May 2020, Petras announced that the song would be released on 7 May 2020. Petras described the song as a "return to color, the feeling of being in love, and the escapism pop that I love the most". Petras also revealed that she "had cried all [her] tears [in the last single, 'Reminds Me' and mixtape, Clarity] and moved on, so this is a reflection of how [she's] been feeling".

The song was included in the expansion pack The Sims 4: Eco Lifestyle with new vocals in Simlish, the fictional language spoken by Sims. Battle Royale game Fortnite also included "Malibu" in their 2021 Rainbow Royale pride event where the song would play in their Power Play radio stations used in the games cars.

The song was also featured in the June 2021 Rocket League soundtrack as both a Playlist song and as a player anthem.

== Composition ==
Petras described the track as a "pick-me-up pop song" which displays a "punchy mix of synth-bass squirts and tropical-funk guitar that lives up to its namesake".

== Reception ==
Desiree Guerrero from Out wrote that the track "might be the song of the summer", describing the song as "glittery, sugary, summery" which is "giving us all the fantasy pop escapism we need right now". Music critic Thomas Bleach named the song a "bonafide banger" and said it "deserves to be embraced on mainstream radio." Maxamillion Polo from Ones to Watch wrote that "'Malibu' is Petras at her finest" and called the song "a euphoric joyride from start to finish".

== Music video ==
Petras released an "at home" music video on 11 May 2020. Filmed in isolation during the COVID-19 pandemic, it features appearances from Paris Hilton, Demi Lovato, Jonathan Van Ness, Madelaine Petsch, Todrick Hall, Pabllo Vittar, Jessie J, Charli XCX, Aly & AJ, Scott Hoying, Aquaria, Loren Gray, Nikita Dragun, Amanda Lepore, Dorian Electra, Bowen Yang, Slayyyter, and Teddy Quinlivan.

== Live performances ==
Petras performed "Malibu" on Jimmy Kimmel Live! on 10 July 2020. She also performed it during HBO Pride Live along with "Heart to Break" and "Blow It All".

== Charts ==
Chart (2020)	Peak position
Scottish Singles Sales (Official Charts)	88
UK Independent Singles Breakers (OCC)	15
