= Heart to Break =

2018 song by Kim Petras

Single by Kim Petras
- Released: 14 February 2018
- Genre: Dance-pop
- Length: 3:45
- Label: Amigo; Republic
- Songwriters: Henry Walter; Aaron Joseph; Lukasz Gottwald; Jacob Kasher Hindlin; Kim Petras
- Producers: Cirkut; Dr. Luke

Kim Petras singles chronology
"Faded" (2017)	"Heart to Break" (2018)	"Can't Do Better" (2018)

"Heart to Break" is a song by German singer Kim Petras. It was released on 14 February 2018, followed by its music video release on 26 April 2018. The track was produced by Dr. Luke and Cirkut, and written by Luke, Cirkut, and Petras as well as Aaron Joseph and Jacob Kasher Hindlin. It is the sixth of eleven singles, released from 2017 to 2019, that form Petras' "Era 1".

== Background and composition ==
In an interview with Billboard, Petras stated "['Heart To Break'] was kind of summing up my heartbreak experiences but making a fun song about them. It's describing the part of you that is about to make a mistake and knows you’re making a mistake, but you don’t care because you still want to jump in and do it." Later in their review of the song, Bryan Kress described the song as an "upbeat, unabashed pop sound" that "ventures into new territory for the songwriter as she confronts a bad relationship while trying to squeeze as much fun from it while it lasts." He later states "The lyrical tightrope of the situation was no easy feat for Petras", who was inspired by "Heart of Glass" by Blondie and "Lovefool" by The Cardigans.

== Music video ==
In its coverage of the video premiere for the song, Paper wrote the video "imagines Petras as a modern-day princess pining for her prince in a surreal purple and blue crystal tower. Instead of being confined to the castle like Rapunzel was, however, Petras roams around the inky landscape outside, eventually having a dance-off with her love interest, breaking glass picture frames, and enticing him before eventually turning to glass and breaking herself."

== Reception ==
Billboard ranked the single as the best Era 1 single, calling it "a master class" and pointing out that "if this is the quality of pop music she’s able to serve up so early in her career, we’re going to be paying attention to Petras for years to come". In 2018, Petras performed it at the Stern TV and at the VBuild Series along with "Hills", "Hillside Boys" and "Can't Do Better". In 2019, she performed the song at the Equality Awards along with "Icy" and "Sweet Spot". In 2020, Petras also performed it during HBO Pride Live along with "Malibu" and "Blow It All".

== Track listing ==
Digital download
No.	Title	Length
1.	"Heart to Break"	3:45

Digital download – Remixes EP
No.	Title	Length
1.	"Heart to Break" (Freedo Remix)	4:01
2.	"Heart to Break" (Freedo Heartbeat Remix)	3:34
3.	"Heart to Break" (Judge Remix)	4:28
4.	"Heart to Break" (Dan Trapp Remix)	3:47

== Charts ==
Chart (2018)	Peak position
US Top 40/CHR (Mediabase)	40
