= 1, 2, 3 Dayz Up =

2019 single by Kim Petras

Single by Kim Petras featuring Sophie
- Released: 8 February 2019
- Genre: Electronic; dance-pop; hyperpop
- Length: 3:33
- Label: Amigo; Republic
- Songwriters: Kim Petras; Aaron Jennings; Aaron Joseph; Lukasz Gottwald; Sophie Xeon
- Producers: Sophie; Aaron Joseph; Dr. Luke

Kim Petras singles chronology
"Homework" (2019)	"1, 2, 3 Dayz Up" (2019)	"Icy" (2019)

Sophie singles chronology
"Faceshopping" (2018)	"1, 2, 3 Dayz Up" (2019)	"Voices" (2019)

"1, 2, 3 Dayz Up" (stylized as "1,2,3 dayz up") is a song by German singer Kim Petras featuring British producer Sophie. It is the final of eleven singles, from 2017 to 2019, that form Petras' Era 1 project.

The song was produced by Sophie, Dr. Luke and Aaron Joseph, and was written by them along with Petras and Aaron Jennings. The track's official lyric video was released on 13 February 2019.

== Background ==
The track was officially released on 8 February alongside the songs "If U Think About Me..." and "Homework" featuring Lil Aaron.

The track was Petras' first release since her Halloween-themed EP Turn Off The Light, Vol. 1 (2018).

== Reception ==
Chloe Gilke of Uproxx was positive in their review of the song and cited as "one of Petras' best releases to date" further dubbing it as "a party anthem that clicks and pops with producer Sophie's electro-pop magic." A writer for DIY proclaimed the song as "an addictive pop banger made all the better by Sophie's slick production". Salvatore Maicki of The Fader was also positive in their review, calling the song "straight up beach party music". Robin Murray of Clash Music called the song "supremely addictive" and further added that track is "superbly feminine while linked utterly to digital developments, it manages to be both an outrageous pop statement and a real 'wtf?' moment."

Billboard ranked the song as the fifth best Era 1 single, noting that "the track has all the makings of a pop hit straight out of 2010, but its bubbly, tropical touches update the sound for the modern era". The Forty-Five's Sophie Walker named it the 38th best hyperpop song of all time.

== Commercial performance ==
The song debuted and peaked at number 40 on the Billboard Dance/Electronic Songs chart.

== Charts ==
Chart (2019)	Peak position
US Hot Dance/Electronic Songs (Billboard)	40
