= Brrr (song) =

2023 single by Kim Petras

Promotional single by Kim Petras

from the album Feed the Beast
- Released: 20 January 2023
- Genre: Hyperpop
- Length: 2:32
- Label: Amigo; Republic
- Songwriters: Ilya Salmanzadeh; Kim Petras; Max Grahn; Nick Harwood; Rami Yacoub
- Producers: Ilya; Rami Yacoub

"Brrr" is a song by German singer Kim Petras. The song was released on 20 January 2023 by Republic Records as the first and only promotional single from Petras' major-label debut studio album Feed the Beast (2023). The track features production work by Ilya.

== Composition ==
NME's Emma Wilkes described the song as an "industrial-inspired pop track". Writers for Billboard called "Brrr" a "hypnotic" hyperpop track, and the Dallas Voice said the song has "industrial beats and bad bitch energy". Cillea Houghton of American Songwriter said, "The song features a throbbing beat layered by Petras’ crisp vocals as she takes on the persona of a fearless character."

== Promotion ==
After posting a snippet of the song on 8 January through her social media, Kim Petras officially announced the release of the song on 11 January.

Petras performed the song on Late Night with Seth Meyers on 23 January, four days after its release. She also performed it on 1 March at the 2023 Billboard Women in Music ceremony.
