= Reminds Me =

2020 single by Kim Petras

Single by Kim Petras
- Released: 11 February 2020
- Genre: R&B; trap-pop; electropop
- Length: 2:37
- Label: Bunhead
- Songwriters: Kim Petras; Aaron Joseph; Sean Small; Sam Sumser; Theron Thomas; Lukasz Gottwald
- Producers: Made in China; Aaron Joseph; Sam Sumser; Sean Small

Kim Petras singles chronology
| "Click (No Boys Remix)" (2019) | "Reminds Me" (2020) | "Malibu" (2020) |

"Reminds Me" is a song by German singer Kim Petras, released as a single on 11 February 2020. Australian rapper the Kid Laroi and American rapper Juice Wrld (posthumously) released a cover of the song, re-titled "Reminds Me of You", on 8 December 2020.

== Promotion ==
On 8 February, Petras performed the song at Manchester Academy on the second night of her two night stint. On the single's release date, Petras tweeted: "💔 #REMINDSME IS OUT NOW 💔 i wanted to make a song for everyone else that might not be getting flowers n chocolates this valentines day . stream this shit if u feel me !!" The song's release was accompanied with an announcement that Petras would join Camila Cabello for the European leg of The Romance Tour. In 2020, she performed the song on Vevo Lift.

== Description and reception ==
MTV's Madeline Roth described "Reminds Me" as an "anti-Valentine's song" and an "ice-cold breakup bop", with Petras "spilling her thoughts over a springy R&B beat". Shaad D'Souza of The Fader called the song a "downcast, mid-tempo trap ballad" and the "kind of breakup track that would have fit perfectly on Petras' recent debut album Clarity". Capital FM made a very similar description, also calling the track "steady". Idolator's Mike Nied described the song as a "bop" with "relatable" lyrics, which he said "capture what it feels like to have your heart broken by someone you trusted". Nied said the song has Petras "chasing away memories of an ex" and "[mourning] over a sparse soundscape. Consequence of Sound's Lake Schatz described "Reminds Me" as a "thumpin' tune", and Valerie Stepanova of V Magazine called the song a "beat-heavy breakup bop". Billy Nilles of E! News wrote that the song was "remarkably relatable". Laura Johnson from Stereoboard outlined the song as "beat-heavy, R&B influenced pop track".

== Juice Wrld and the Kid Laroi cover version ==
"Reminds Me of You"

Single by Juice Wrld and the Kid Laroi
- Released: 8 December 2020
- Genre: Emo rap
- Length: 2:38
- Label: Grade A Productions; Interscope; Foundation Media
- Songwriters: Jarad Higgins; Charlton Howard; Kim Petras; Aaron Joseph; Lukasz Gottwald; Sam Sumser; Sean Small; Theron Thomas
- Producers: Joseph; Dr. Luke; Sam Sumser; Sean Small; Thomas

Juice Wrld singles chronology
| "Real Shit" (2020) | "Reminds Me of You" (2020) | "Bad Boy" (2021) |

The Kid Laroi singles chronology
| "My City" (2020) | "Reminds Me of You" (2020) | "Without You" (2020) |

Lyric video
- "Reminds Me of You" on YouTube

"Reminds Me of You" is a song by American rapper Juice Wrld and Australian rapper and singer the Kid Laroi, released on 8 December 2020, via Grade A Productions through exclusive licensing to Interscope Records and marketed by Foundation Media.

=== Background ===
The song marks their third official collaboration, and it was released on 8 December 2020, which is the one-year anniversary of Juice Wrld's death. About the song, Petras stated:

"Kid Laroi asked to do the song, but also back when we were doing the song, Juice came to the studio and he recorded this amazing verse on "Reminds Me", and had I always, always in the back of my mind hoped it would see the light of day. I've always hoped there was some kind of way his verse could come out so, it’s coming out tonight. I don't feel at all that anyone took anything from anybody, I just think this is giving the song a whole new life."

— Kim Petras, in an Instagram live clip.

=== Composition ===
On the track, the Kid Laroi and Juice Wrld talk about how everything reminds them of their past lovers and lament how hard it is for them to move on after a failed relationship. The song "re-imagines" Petras' version, "morphing her electro-pop euphoria" into a heartbroken emo-rap song.

=== Credits and personnel ===
Credits adapted from Tidal:

- Jarad Higgins – vocals, songwriting, composition
- Charlton Howard – vocals, songwriting, composition
- Kim Petras – songwriting, composition
- Aaron Joseph – songwriting, composition, production
- Lukasz Gottwald – songwriting, composition, production
- Sam Sumser – songwriting, composition, production
- Sean Small – songwriting, composition, production
- Theron Thomas – songwriting, composition, production
- Dale Becker – mastering
- Serban Ghenea – mixing
- Clint Gibbs – studio personnel
- John Hanes – studio personnel
- Kalani Thompson – studio personnel
- Seth Ringo – studio personnel
- Tyler Sheppard – studio personnel

=== Charts ===
Chart performance for "Reminds Me of You"
| Chart (2020–2021) | Peak position |
|---|---|
| Belgium (Ultratip Bubbling Under Flanders) | 15 |
| Canada Hot 100 (Billboard) | 56 |
| Global 200 (Billboard) | 88 |
| Greece International (IFPI) | 84 |
| Ireland (IRMA) | 48 |
| Lithuania (AGATA) | 93 |
| New Zealand Hot Singles (RMNZ) | 5 |
| Sweden Heatseeker (Sverigetopplistan) | 10 |
| UK Singles (Official Charts) | 63 |
| UK Hip Hop/R&B (Official Charts) | 22 |
| UK Indie (Official Charts) | 9 |
| US Billboard Hot 100 | 89 |
| US Hot R&B/Hip-Hop Songs (Billboard) | 26 |
| US Rolling Stone Top 100 | 82 |

=== Certifications ===
Certifications for "Reminds Me of You"
| Region | Certification | Certified units/sales |
|---|---|---|
| New Zealand (RMNZ) | Gold | 15,000^{‡} |
| United Kingdom (BPI) | Silver | 200,000^{‡} |
^{‡} Sales+streaming figures based on certification alone.
