= Slut Pop =

EP by Kim Petras
- Released: 11 February 2022
- Genre: Dance-pop
- Length: 15:52
- Labels: Amigo; Republic
- Producer: Dr. Luke

Kim Petras chronology
Turn Off the Light (2019)	Slut Pop (2022)	The Summer I Couldn't Do Better (2022)

Slut Pop is the third extended play (EP) by German singer Kim Petras, released on 11 February 2022 through Amigo Records and Republic. It is her first project to be released under a major label. A follow-up EP, entitled Slut Pop Miami was released on 14 February 2024.

== Background ==
"People don’t take people seriously — women, especially — who sing slutty songs or songs about sex, and write it off as not being important. I think that’s so stupid… I fully believe that takes as much skill as writing any other kind of song. And so I was like, “You know what? I make slut pop. And I’m proud of that. And you can suck it if you don’t take me seriously. I don’t care."

— Petras talking about her new music for Paper

Kim Petras signed to Republic Records in 2021 and then started to work on new music for her major label debut studio album, as well other musical projects. About the new songs, Petras stated that she explored sexual themes, getting inspired by other artists, citing Britney Spears as an example. The EP process was completed in two months, and the track listing was put together when the singer realized that she had enough songs about the same theme to put on a whole project on its own. The album cover was shot by Devin Kasparian.

== Composition ==
A dance-pop EP with influences of tech house and electropop, Slut Pop was described as an "X-rated" album about "slutty, sexual fantasies". According to PopCrush, it features "throbbing beats, dirty lyrics and sex-positive anthems inspired by the sex workers community".

== Release and promotion ==
In the weeks leading up to Slut Pop's release, Petras posted videos teasing its songs on social media, as well stills from a new photoshoot done for the project. To promote the EP, Petras realized a club crawl branded as Slut Tour, during which she performed at multiple nightclubs in one night.

On January 7, 2024, a vinyl release of the EP was made available for pre-order. The record was sold out in under a few hours.

On January 22, 2024, Petras announced on Instagram the official vinyl release of Slut Pop.

== Reception ==
The project received a mixed reception. While some critics praised the EP's sex-positive nature, others criticized Petras' association with producer Dr. Luke, who produced the entirety of the EP.

== Track listing ==
Slut Pop track listing
No.	Title	Lyrics	Music	Length
1.	"Slut Pop"	Kim Petras; Aaron Joseph	Lukasz Gottwald; Rocco Valdes; Ryan Ogren; Aaron Jennings	1:58
2.	"Treat Me like a Slut"	Petras; Joseph	Gottwald; Valdes; Joseph; Jennings	1:58
3.	"XXX"	Petras; Joseph; Chloe Angelides	Gottwald; Valdes; Joseph; Ogren; Alex Chapman	2:04
4.	"Superpower Bitch"	Petras	Gottwald; Valdes; Ogren	2:08
5.	"Throat Goat"	Petras	Gottwald; Valdes; Ogren	2:20
6.	"They Wanna Fuck"	Petras; Joseph; Angelides	Gottwald; Chapman	2:30
7.	"Your Wish Is My Command"	Petras; Joseph	Gottwald	2:54
Total length:				15:52

== Personnel ==
- Kim Petras – vocals
- Dr. Luke – production, programming
- Dale Becker – mastering
- Clint Gibbs – mixing

== Charts ==
Chart performance for Slut Pop
Chart (2022)	Peak position
Australian Albums (ARIA)	77
UK Album Downloads (Official Charts)	34
US Heatseekers Albums (Billboard)	1
US Top Current Album Sales (Billboard)	60

== Release history ==
Release dates and formats for Slut Pop
Region	Date	Format	Label
Various	11 February 2022	Digital download; streaming	Republic
Various	9 February 2024	LP	Republic
