= Turn Off the Light (mixtape) =

Mixtape by Kim Petras
- Released: 1 October 2019
- Recorded: 2018–2019
- Genres: Electropop; dance-pop; techno; industrial techno; trap
- Length: 48:58
- Languages: English; German
- Label: BunHead
- Producers: Kim Petras; Made in China; Aaron Joseph; Vaughn Oliver; B HAM

Kim Petras chronology
Clarity (2019)	Turn Off the Light (2019)	Slut Pop (2022)

Turn Off the Light is the second mixtape by German singer Kim Petras. It was released on 1 October 2019 and originally through her own label, BunHead. The album was originally supposed to be released in two volumes, Turn Off the Light, Vol. 1 and Vol. 2 – although it was ultimately released as a full-length album comprising the eight songs from the first volume and nine new songs recorded for the second volume.

Turn Off the Light was met with near-universal critical acclaim upon release. Critics praised the production, especially the dark and club-infused sound with elements like blood-curdling beats and demonic synths. Multiple tracks were highlighted by reviewers for their catchy melodies and spooky vibes. The album was seen as both danceable and thematically fitting for Halloween with its horror influences like haunted choirs and creepy sound effects. Petras' vocal performances were also praised by the majority of critics.

== Background ==
After the release of Turn Off the Light, Vol. 1, Petras initially announced Turn Off the Light, Vol. 2, and even as late as early September 2019, said the follow-up EP would be arriving on 1 October. Instead, on 29 September, Petras announced that she was giving fans "the whole damn story", posting a pre-order link and track list for the project.

On October 23, 2020, Petras announced that she would be releasing a third and final Turn Off the Light volume in October 2021, however nothing ended up being released then. She shared that the reason for the release date was her desire to perform the songs live for her fans upon release, something she couldn't do if it was released in 2020 due to the ongoing COVID-19 pandemic. "I can't do it if I can't perform it live for you guys, immediately. I have to. It needs to be fresh, and there's a bunch of stuff I want to do to make it really epic." Petras released the single "Party Till I Die" immediately following the announcement of the third installment.

== Composition ==
=== Songs ===
The second half of the album, which was released as Vol. 1 exactly one year prior, opens with "Omen", inspired by the Halloween soundtrack, and contains "ominous production" and "heavenly vocals" by Petras before transitioning into "Close Your Eyes", called a "zombie-fied banger" with a "racing beat" by Idolator. "TRANSylvania" does not feature much of Petras' vocals, but includes a "throbbing bass and haunting sound effects". The title track "Turn Off the Light" drew inspiration from Britney Spears' album Blackout and features lyrics about "dangerous love" and a guest appearance from Elvira, who states: "Embrace your fear, don't dare to run. Only then will you be what you're meant to become." The "dark, dance-pop banger" was described as "LGBTQ+ excellence" by MTV News. "Tell Me It's a Nightmare" also concerns the theme of dangerous love, while "I Don't Wanna Die..." is a "synth-driven" song that, according to Idolator, could be heard at clubs. "In the Next Life" is a "dark pop" track and an "electro-kissed banger", while closing track "Boo! Bitch!" was considered to contain the same elements as "I Don't Wanna Die..."

== Critical reception ==
Turn Off the Light received positive reviews from music critics, who praised its production, lyricism, themes and Petras' vocal performance. Writing for Billboard, Stephen Daw wrote that the album "maintains the club-infused production of the album's first volume", and pointed out that the tracks "There Will Be Blood", "Wrong Turn" and "Death by Sex" sounded "like Daft Punk deep cuts imbued with demonic synths and blood-curling beats". MTV News' Trey Alston noted songs such as "There Will Be Blood", calling the track "an electrifying slice of Petras singing about your demise", alongside "Bloody Valentine", describing the track as an "awesome midnight funk that could get even Frankenstein onto the dance floor", together with "Omen", a "cheery and sinister" song that "sounds like the excitement that vampires get as they stare at exposed necks in the middle of the club".

Writing for Paper magazine, Michael Love Michael praised "Wrong Turn", writing that the "music is appropriately adventurous: a dark, bouncy synthline and Petras' quivering vocal performance keeps momentum going, like victims running from a masked killer". In a separate article, Michael said that the newer sounds were "scarier" as they incorporated "familiar sonic tropes like thunder, dramatic organ, haunted children's choirs, mutated screams, and more unexpected sounds, like knives scraping against each other".

The song "Party Till I Die" was included on Billboard's list of the best LGBTQ songs of 2020.

== Track listing ==
Turn Off the Light – Standard edition
No.	Title	Writer(s)	Producer(s)	Length
1.	"Purgatory"	Kim Petras; Aaron Joseph; Lukasz Gottwald; Vaughn Oliver	Made in China; Oliver	2:08
2.	"There Will Be Blood"	Petras; Joseph; Gottwald; Oliver; Jesse Saint John; Theron Thomas	Made in China; Oliver; Joseph	3:17
3.	"Bloody Valentine"	Petras; Joseph; Gottwald; Oliver	Made in China; Oliver	2:41
4.	"Wrong Turn"	Petras; Joseph; Gottwald; Oliver; John; Thomas	Made in China; Oliver; Joseph	3:20
5.	"Demons"	Petras; Joseph; Gottwald; Oliver	Made in China; Oliver	1:57
6.	"Massacre"	Petras; Joseph; Gottwald; Oliver; John; Thomas	Made in China; Joseph	3:26
7.	"Knives"	Petras; Joseph; Gottwald; Oliver	Made in China; Oliver	2:20
8.	"Death by Sex"	Petras; Joseph; Gottwald; Aaron Jennings Puckett; Brandon Hamlin	Made in China; Joseph; B HAM	3:22
9.	"Omen"	Petras; Joseph; Gottwald; Oliver	Made in China; Oliver	1:39
10.	"Close Your Eyes"	Petras; Joseph; Gottwald; John; Sarah Hudson	Made in China; Joseph	3:55
11.	"Transylvania"	Petras; Joseph; Gottwald; Oliver	Made in China; Oliver	2:59
12.	"Turn Off the Light" (featuring Elvira, Mistress of the Dark)	Petras; Joseph; Gottwald; John; Hudson	Made in China; Joseph	3:11
13.	"Tell Me It's a Nightmare"	Petras; Joseph; Gottwald; John; Hudson	Made in China; Joseph	4:08
14.	"I Don't Wanna Die..."	Petras; Joseph; Gottwald; John; Oliver	Made in China; Oliver	2:06
15.	"In the Next Life"	Petras; Joseph; Gottwald; John; Hudson	Made in China; Oliver; Joseph	3:44
16.	"Boo! Bitch!"	Petras; Joseph; Gottwald; John; Oliver	Made in China; Oliver	1:21
17.	"Everybody Dies"	Petras; Joseph; Gottwald; John; Thomas	Made in China; Joseph	3:24
Total length:				48:58

Turn Off the Light – 2020 reissue
No.	Title	Writer(s)	Producer(s)	Length
18.	"Party Till I Die"	Petras; Joseph; Gottwald; Puckett; Oliver; Alex Chapman	Made in China; Oliver; Joseph	3:34
Total length:				52:32

Notes

- "Demons" is stylised as "<demons>".
- "Massacre" contains an interpolation of "Carol of the Bells" (1936), written by Mykola Leontovych and Peter Wilhousky, which itself is based on the Ukrainian folk song "Shchedryk", as arranged by Leontovych.
- "Omen" is stylised as "o m e n" on this album and as "O m E N" on Turn Off the Light, Vol. 1.
- "Transylvania" is stylised as "TRANSylvania".
- "I Don't Wanna Die..." is stylised in sentence case on some platforms and in all lowercase on others.
- With the release of "Party Till I Die" the styling of songs like "Omen" now reflect their stylization on Vol. 1 as opposed to the album stylization.

== Charts ==
Chart performance for Turn Off the Light
Chart (2019–2020)	Peak position
US Heatseekers Albums (Billboard)	14
US Independent Albums (Billboard)	42
US Top Album Sales (Billboard)	84
US Top Current Album Sales (Billboard)	46

== Release history ==
Release dates and formats for Turn Off the Light
Region	Date	Format	Version	Label
Various	1 October 2019	Digital download; streaming	Original	Bunhead
Various	23 October 2020	Digital download; streaming	Reissue	Bunhead
Various	30 October 2020	LP	Original	Bunhead
Various	31 October 2023	LP	Reissue	Amigo / Republic
