= Turn Off the Light, Vol. 1 =

2018 EP by Kim Petras

EP by Kim Petras
- Released: 1 October 2018
- Recorded: 2018
- Genres: Dance-pop; dark-disco
- Length: 23:10
- Label: BunHead
- Producers: Made in China; Aaron Joseph; Vaughn Oliver

Kim Petras chronology
One Piece of Tape (2011)	Turn Off the Light, Vol. 1 (2018)	Clarity (2019)

Turn Off the Light, Vol. 1 is the second extended play by German singer and songwriter Kim Petras. It was released on 1 October 2018 through her own label, BunHead Records. Petras began promoting the EP in mid-September, posting heavily edited photos to Instagram of herself, according to Paper, "styled as a sexy dead Victoria's Secret angel/Hades side-chick/goth middle schooler's notebook-doodled fantasy. She later posted to Twitter that she "[couldn't] wait to share" a collaboration with Elvira. Three vinyl LP pressings were released on 20 September 2019: a "pink and white galaxy swirl" and a clear vinyl, which were exclusive to Urban Outfitters in the US, and a neon pink pressing which is a general retail release. The songs from the EP were incorporated into the full-length follow-up Turn Off the Light, which was released as her second mixtape one year later on 1 October 2019.

== Music ==
The EP opens with "Omen", inspired by the Halloween soundtrack, and contains "ominous production" and "heavenly vocals" by Petras before transitioning into "Close Your Eyes", called a "zombie-fied banger" with a "racing beat" by Idolator. "TRANSylvania" does not feature much of Petras' vocals, but includes a "throbbing bass and haunting sound effects". The title track "Turn Off the Light" drew inspiration from Britney Spears' album Blackout and features lyrics about "dangerous love" and a guest appearance from Elvira, who states: "Embrace your fear, don't dare to run. Only then will you be what you're meant to become." The "dark, dance-pop banger" was described as "LGBTQ+ excellence" by MTV News. "Tell Me It's a Nightmare" also concerns the theme of dangerous love, while "I Don't Wanna Die..." is a "synth-driven" song that, according to Idolator, could be heard at clubs. "In the Next Life" is a "dark pop" track and an "electro-kissed banger", while closing track "Boo! Bitch!" was considered to contain the same elements as "I Don't Wanna Die..."

== Accolades ==
Publication	Accolade	Rank	Ref.
Idolator	Top 20 Best EPs, Mixtapes and Playlists of 2018	13	

== Track listing ==
Credits adapted from Tidal.

No.	Title	Writer(s)	Producer(s)	Length
1.	"Omen"	Kim Petras; Lukasz Gottwald; Aaron Joseph; Vaughn Oliver	Made in China; Oliver	1:40
2.	"Close Your Eyes"	Petras; Gottwald; Joseph; Jesse Saint John; Sarah Hudson	Made in China; Joseph	3:56
3.	"Transylvania"	Petras; Gottwald; Joseph; Oliver	Made in China; Oliver	2:59
4.	"Turn Off the Light" (featuring Elvira, Mistress of the Dark)	Petras; Gottwald; Joseph; John; Hudson	Made in China; Joseph	3:12
5.	"Tell Me It's a Nightmare"	Petras; Gottwald; Joseph; John; Hudson	Made in China; Joseph	4:09
6.	"I Don't Wanna Die..."	Petras; Gottwald; Joseph; John; Oliver	Made in China; Oliver	2:07
7.	"In the Next Life"	Petras; Gottwald; Joseph; John; Hudson	Made in China; Oliver; Joseph	3:45
8.	"Boo! Bitch!"	Petras; Gottwald; Joseph; John; Oliver	Made in China; Oliver	1:22
Total length:				23:10

Notes

- "Omen" is stylised as "o m e n".
- "Transylvania" is stylised as "TRANSylvania".
- "I Don't Wanna Die..." is stylised in sentence case on some platforms and in all lowercase on others.

== Charts ==
Chart (2018)	Peak position
US Heatseekers Albums (Billboard)	21
US Independent Albums (Billboard)	45
