= Sweet Spot (Kim Petras song) =

Promotional single by Kim Petras

from the album Clarity
- Released: May 13, 2019
- Genre: Disco; dance-pop
- Length: 3:14
- Label: Amigo; Republic
- Songwriters: Kim Petras; Lukasz Gottwald; Aaron Joseph; Theron Thomas; Vaughn Oliver
- Producers: Made in China; Aaron Joseph; Vaughn Oliver

"Sweet Spot" is a song by German singer Kim Petras from her debut mixtape Clarity (2019). It was released on 13 May 2019 as the mixtape's fourth weekly promotional single, by BunHead Records. Petras released this song among others from the same project in preparation for the Broken Tour.

== Reception ==
Rolling Stone commented on how the track had the potential to be the song of the summer, while multiple music critics and journalists, such as Jordan Miller of BreatheHeavy, Jeremy Helligar of Variety, and Nick Levine of NME compared the track to Kylie Minogue's works, including her albums Light Years and Fever. In July 2020, the song was featured in a lip sync battle during the eighth episode of the YouTube drag series “The Drag Ball 3”

== Track listing ==
- Digital download
- streaming
1. "Sweet Spot" – 3:14

== Credits and personnel ==
- Written by Kim Petras, Lukasz Gottwald, Aaron Joseph, Theron Thomas and Vaughn Oliver
- Produced by Made in China, Aaron Joseph and Vaughn Oliver
- Vocals by Kim Petras

== Release history ==
Region	Date	Format	Label
Various	13 May 2019	Digital download; streaming	BunHead
