= I Don't Want It at All =

Single by Kim Petras
- Released: 1 August 2017
- Genre: Dance-pop
- Length: 4:10
- Label: Amigo; Republic
- Songwriters: Aaron Jennings; Aaron Joseph; Henry Walter; Kim Petras; Lukasz Gottwald
- Producers: Cirkut; Dr. Luke; Joseph

Kim Petras singles chronology
| "I Don't Want It at All" (2017) | "Hillside Boys" (2017) |

"I Don't Want It at All" is the debut international single by German singer Kim Petras, released on 1 August 2017. It was co-written and co-produced by Petras and Lil Aaron, along with Dr. Luke and Cirkut. It is the first of eleven songs, released from 2017 to 2019, that form Petras' "Era 1" project.

The song reached number 54 on the US Dance Club Songs chart in March 2018. A music video was released in October 2017 featuring a cameo appearance by Paris Hilton.

== Background and composition ==
Petras and rapper Aaron Jennings, better known as Lil Aaron, came up with the idea for the hook of the song soon after meeting when Petras, who had been on a shopping trip, brought several bags into the studio. Although he was not officially credited, the track was also worked on by songwriter Aaron Joseph, who was signed to Dr. Luke's publishing company Prescription Songs after Luke and his management had heard about Joseph corresponding with a hacker he believed to be Luke. Through this, Joseph was introduced to Petras and contributed to the track.

== Reception ==
AllMusic called the song an "'80s-infused dance-pop tune". Galore magazine said it was a "bratty banger", while Entertainment Weekly described it as a "shop-'till-you-drop-anthem". Bakersfield.com labeled the track a "21st-century pop update of Madonna's 'Material Girl'". Noisey writer Colin Joyce called the song a "glitzy paean to consumerist excess".

Billboard ranked the single as the second best Era 1 single, noting: "From the effortlessly cool, synth-heavy intro to the song's bratty lyricism, Petras separated herself from her pop peers by dreaming up an expensive fantasy in this escapist jam."

Petras performed the song on Perez Hilton's Perez Hilton TV, and Popdust, the latter along with "Hillside Boys".

== Music video ==
The music video was released on October 30, 2017, directed by Charlotte Rutherford. Petras and her friend came up with the concept and pitched it to Rutherford, with Petras calling it a "teen girl's fantasy" and noting it was inspired by the fairy tale "The Princess and the Pea". Paris Hilton makes a cameo appearance in a recreation of Weird Science (1985).

== Charts ==
Chart performance for "I Don't Want It at All"
| Chart (2018) | Peak position |
|---|---|
| US Dance Club Songs (Billboard) | 54 |
