= Clarity (mixtape) =

Mixtape by Kim Petras
- Released: 28 June 2019
- Genre: Pop; bubblegum pop; hip hop; R&B; synth-pop
- Length: 38:12
- Label: BunHead
- Producer: Made in China; Aaron Joseph; B HAM; Jussifer; Oliver; Ben Billions

Kim Petras chronology
Turn Off the Light, Vol. 1 (2018)	Clarity (2019)	Turn Off the Light (2019)

Singles from Clarity
- 1. "Icy" Released: 27 June 2019

Clarity is the debut mixtape by German singer Kim Petras, released on 28 June 2019 through her own label, BunHead Records. Nine of its twelve tracks were released beforehand, beginning in April 2019. It was produced by Made in China, Aaron Joseph, Brandon Hamlin, Jussifer, Oliver and Ben Billions. Petras stated that this project is her "personal journey over the last two years".

Clarity received critical acclaim from critics upon release, who praised its catchy pop sound, with some comparing it to artists like Robyn, Britney Spears, and Christina Aguilera. To promote the album, Petras embarked on the Clarity Tour starting with North America and then Europe.

== Background ==
Petras has said the project is "about finding myself. It started with 'Broken' and will end with 'Clarity' because it reflects my personal journey over the last two years." Nine of the songs were released in advance, including the "breakup anthem" "Broken", "downtempo" song "All I Do Is Cry", the "hookup anthem" "Do Me", and the "bouncy banger" "Personal Hell".

The first song that was released from Clarity was "Broken", on 25 April 2019 written by Petras herself and co-writer Anthony Medina. Petras later released one song every week to streaming services after that for ten weeks. Petras confirmed on Twitter that the tenth song that was released from Clarity, "Icy", was the actual lead single.

== Composition ==
The album contains elements of synth-pop, bubblegum pop, hip hop, contemporary R&B, glam rock and emo pop. Reviewers also noted a shift towards darker themes and hip-hop influences on the project, though most still emphasized the danceable aspect of some tracks from the album.

== Critical reception ==
Professional ratings
Aggregate scores
Source	Rating
Metacritic	83/100
Review scores
Source	Rating
The Guardian	4/5 stars
The New York Times	10/10
NME	4/5 stars
Pitchfork	7.2/10
Variety	7.5/10

On Metacritic, the project received a score of 83 out of 100, indicating "universal acclaim". Variety called the project "sturdy pop songcraft" and compared it favorably to Robyn's 1995 album Robyn Is Here, also making a comparison between Petras' career trajectory and that of Lorde. Comparing the record to the early 2000s pop hits of Britney Spears and Christina Aguilera, The Guardian gave the album 4 out of 5 stars and praised its power-pop sound. It also wrote that Petras' "addictively crafted bubblegum pop" makes her "sound like a superstar from a parallel universe", and praised her musical experimentation. Writing for Stereogum, Chris DeVille identified the main theme of the album as "looking for release through sex and materialism". DeVille noted that it marks a shift in Petras' content from "sparkling pop sound into a mistier, sadder, more hip-hop-adjacent territory" and praised it as "an impressive collection". Tyler Mazaheri of Flaunt favored the album's nontraditional single-a-week promotion and praised the project for its "catchy choruses layered over danceable beats", adding that "the album is sure to pack all the bops [audiences will] be hearing in the club for the unforeseeable future." In his review of the single "Icy", Michael Love Michael of Paper proclaimed "Kim Petras just might have released one of this year's most compelling pop collections."

Year-end lists
Publication	Accolade	Rank	Ref.
Billboard	The 50 Best Albums of 2019	48	
The New York Times	Best Albums of 2019	4	
Uproxx	The 35 Best Pop Albums of 2019	17	

== Promotion ==
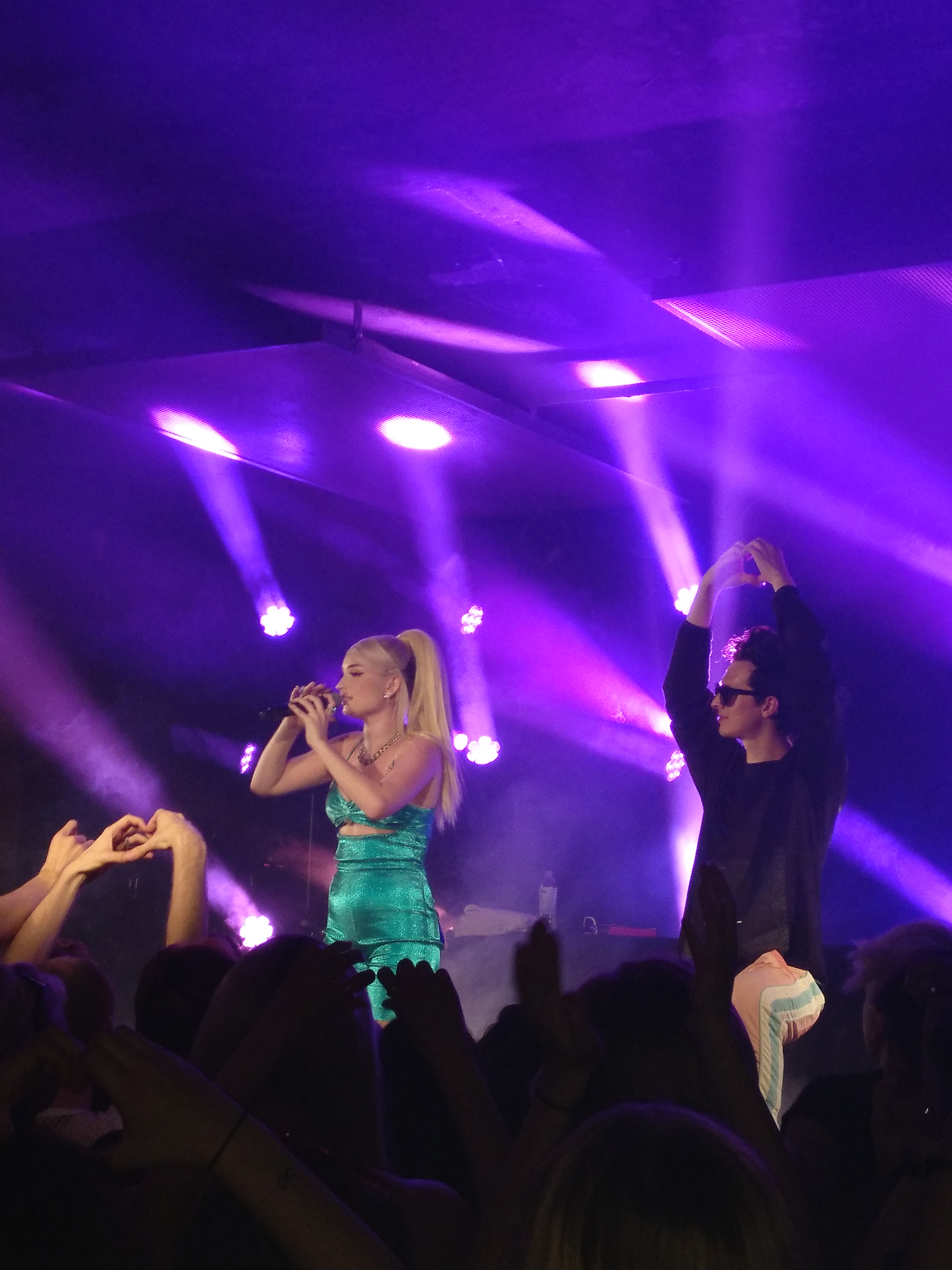
Petras performing next to Aaron Joseph during the Broken Tour in Berlin

Prior to the release of Clarity, Petras began embarking on her 24-stop promotional tour, The Broken Tour. Through May and June, Petras appeared on a number of magazine covers including ones for Galore, The Gay Times, Flaunt, Notion, and AtKode.

=== Singles ===
Petras released the first song from Clarity, "Broken", on 25 April 2019. Petras released one song every week to streaming services after that for ten weeks in preparation for her debut concert tour Broken Tour. Petras later confirmed on Twitter that the tenth song to be released from the album, "Icy", was the actual lead single.

== Track listing ==
Clarity track listing
No.	Title	Writer(s)	Producer(s)	Length
1.	"Clarity"	Kim Petras; Lukasz Gottwald; Aaron Joseph; Aaron Jennings; Brandon Hamlin	Made in China; Joseph; B HAM	2:02
2.	"Icy"	Petras; Gottwald; Joseph; Theron Thomas; Vaughn Oliver	Made in China; Joseph; Oliver	3:09
3.	"Got My Number"	Petras; Gottwald; Joseph; Jennings; Jussi Karvinen	Made in China; Joseph; Jussifer	2:54
4.	"Sweet Spot"	Petras; Gottwald; Joseph; Thomas; Oliver	Made in China; Joseph; Oliver	3:14
5.	"Personal Hell"	Petras; Gottwald; Joseph; Thomas; Oliver; Madison Love	Made in China; Joseph; Oliver	3:40
6.	"Broken"	Petras; Gottwald; Joseph; Thomas; Hamlin; Ben Diehl	Made in China; Joseph; B HAM; Ben Billions	3:48
7.	"All I Do Is Cry"	Petras; Gottwald; Joseph; Nic Nac	Made in China; Joseph	3:23
8.	"Do Me"	Petras; Gottwald; Joseph; Thomas; Oliver	Made in China; Joseph; Oliver	3:32
9.	"Meet the Parents"	Petras; Gottwald; Joseph; Jennings	Made in China; Joseph	2:12
10.	"Another One"	Petras; Gottwald; Joseph; Thomas; Love	Made in China; Joseph	3:45
11.	"Blow It All"	Petras; Gottwald; Joseph; Thomas; Ryan Ogren	Made in China; Joseph	2:58
12.	"Shinin'"	Petras; Gottwald; Joseph; Thomas; Jennings	Made in China; Joseph	3:35
Total length:				38:12

== Charts ==
Chart performance for Clarity
Chart (2019–2020)	Peak position
US Heatseekers Albums (Billboard)	7
US Independent Albums (Billboard)	28
US Top Current Album Sales (Billboard)	78

== See also ==
- 31st GLAAD Media Awards
