= Coi Leray discography =

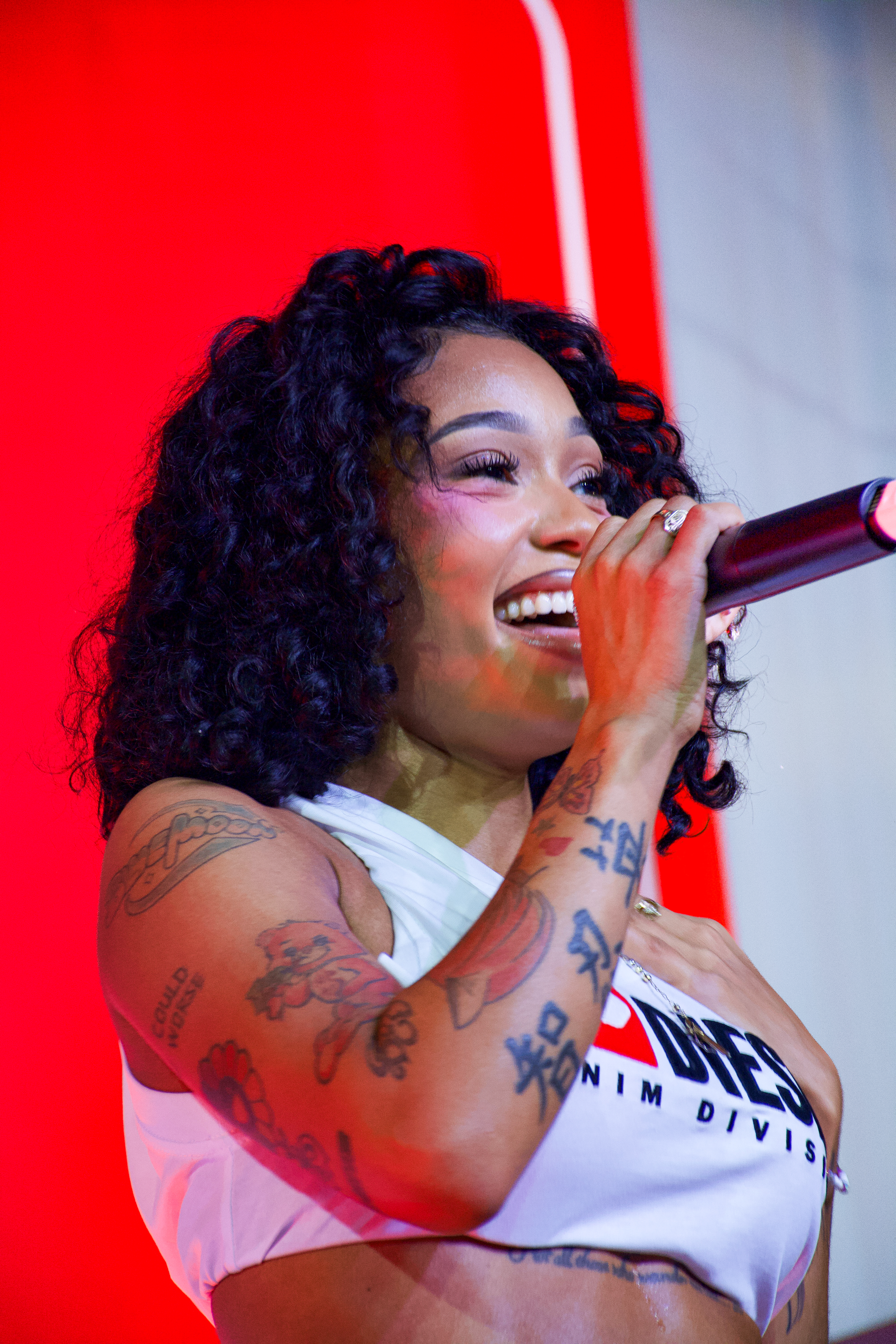
- Coi Leray performing in 2026
- Studio albums: 2
- EPs: 4
- Mixtapes: 2
- Compilation albums: 2
- Singles: 68

The discography of American rapper and singer Coi Leray consists of two studio albums, two mixtapes, four extended plays, two compilation albums, and 68 singles (including 31 as a featured artist).

== Studio albums ==
Title	Details	Peak chart positions	
Title	Details	US	US R&B/HH
Trendsetter	Released: April 8, 2022; Label: Republic, 1801, Uptown; Format: CD, LP, digital download, streaming	89	49
Coi	Released: June 23, 2023; Label: Republic, Uptown; Formats: Digital download, streaming	102	45

== Mixtapes ==
Title	Details
EverythingCoZ	Released: March 30, 2018; Label: Self-released; Format: Digital download, streaming
EC2	Released: January 18, 2019; Label: 1801, Republic; Format: Digital download, streaming

== Extended plays ==
Title	Details
Now or Never	Released: August 14, 2020; Label: 1801, Republic; Format: Digital download, streaming
Blue Moon	Released: August 30, 2023; Label: Republic, Uptown, Universal; Format: Digital download, streaming
Lemon Cars	Released: May 24, 2024; Label: Island, Universal; Format: Digital download, streaming
What Happened to Forever?	Released: February 12, 2025; Label: Trendsetter Studios, Epic; Format: Digital download, streaming

=== Compilation EPs ===
Title	Details
Better Things	Released: March 12, 2021; Label: Universal; Format: Digital download, streaming
Trendsetter	Released: March 19, 2021; Label: Universal; Format: Digital download, streaming

== Singles ==
=== As lead artist ===
Title	Year	Peak chart positions								Certifications	Album
Title	Year	US	US R&B /HH	US Rap	AUS	CAN	NZ	UK	WW	Certifications	Album
"G.A.N."	2018	—	—	—	—	—	—	—	—		EverythingCoZ
"No Longer Mine"	2018	—	—	—	—	—	—	—	—		Non-album single
"Huddy"	2018	—	—	—	—	—	—	—	—		EC2
"Good Day"	2019	—	—	—	—	—	—	—	—		Non-album single
"Big" (featuring Lil Gotit)	2019	—	—	—	—	—	—	—	—		Trendsetter (EP)
"Add It"	2019	—	—	—	—	—	—	—	—		Trendsetter (EP)
"Messy"	2020	—	—	—	—	—	—	—	—		Now or Never
"Better Days" (featuring Fetty Wap)	2020	—	—	—	—	—	—	—	—		Now or Never
"Do Better"	2020	—	—	—	—	—	—	—	—		Now or Never
"Rick Owens"	2020	—	—	—	—	—	—	—	—		Trendsetter (EP)
"Merry Xmas" (featuring Dess Dior & Maliibu Miitch)	2020	—	—	—	—	—	—	—	—		Non-album single
"No More Parties" (solo or featuring Lil Durk)	2021	26	15	11	—	—	—	85	70	RIAA: 2× Platinum	Trendsetter
"Big Purr (Prrdd)" (featuring Pooh Shiesty)	2021	69	32	—	—	—	—	—	142	RIAA: Gold	Trendsetter
"On Ice"	2021	—	—	—	—	—	—	—	—		Non-album singles
"Beat It Up" (with TruCarr)	2021	—	—	—	—	—	—	—	—		Non-album singles
"Bout Me"	2021	—	—	—	—	—	—	—	—		Non-album singles
"Options" (Remix) (with EarthGang and Wale)	2021	—	—	—	—	—	—	—	—		Non-album singles
"At the Top" (featuring Kodak Black and Mustard)	2021	—	—	—	—	—	—	—	—		Non-album singles
"What U Want" (with Lil Xxel and Tyga)	2021	—	—	—	—	—	—	—	—		Non-album singles
"Okay Yeah!"	2021	—	—	—	—	—	—	—	—		Non-album singles
"Twinnem"	2021	—	—	—	—	—	—	—	—	RIAA: Gold	Trendsetter
"Anxiety"	2022	—	—	—	—	—	—	—	—		Trendsetter
"Blick Blick" (with Nicki Minaj)	2022	37	10	8	—	68	— (Note: "Blick Blick" did not enter the NZ Top 40 Singles Chart, but peaked at number 10 on the NZ Hot Singles Chart.)	— (Note: "Blick Blick" did not enter the UK Singles Chart, but peaked at number 82 on the UK Streaming Chart.)	66	RIAA: Gold	Trendsetter
"Involved"	2022	—	—	—	—	—	—	—	—		Non-album singles
"Fly Sh!t"	2022	—	—	—	—	—	—	—	—		Non-album singles
"Players"	2022	9	4	1	7	10	6	7	17	RIAA: Platinum; ARIA: 5× Platinum; BPI: Platinum; MC: 3× Platinum; RMNZ: 2× Platinum	Coi
"Wasted"	2022	—	—	—	—	—	—	—	—		Non-album single
"Baby Don't Hurt Me" (with David Guetta and Anne-Marie)	2023	48	—	—	67	15	—	13	41	ARIA: Platinum; BPI: Platinum; MC: Platinum	Super Unhealthy (Voicenote Edition)
"Bops"	2023	—	— (Note: "Bops" did not enter the Hot R&B/Hip-Hop Songs Chart, but peaked at number 45 on the R&B/Hip-Hop Airplay Chart.)	—	—	—	—	—	—		Coi
"My Body"	2023	—	—	—	—	—	—	—	—		Coi
"Run It Up"	2023	—	—	—	—	—	—	—	—		Coi
"Make My Day" (with David Guetta)	2023	—	—	—	—	—	— (Note: "Make My Day" did not enter the NZ Top 40 Singles Chart, but peaked at number 32 on the NZ Hot Singles Chart.)	—	—		Coi
"Wanna Come Thru" (with Mike Will Made It)	2024	—	—	—	—	—	—	—	—		Lemon Cars
"Can't Come Back"	2024	—	—	—	—	—	—	—	—		Lemon Cars
"Lemon Cars"	2024	—	—	—	—	—	—	—	—		Lemon Cars
"Heart Don’t Lie"	2024	—	—	—	—	—	—	—	—		Non-album singles
"Candy Crush"	2024	—	—	—	—	—	—	—	—		Non-album singles
"Keep It"	2025	—	—	—	—	—	—	—	—		What Happened to Forever?
"—" denotes releases that did not chart or were not released in that region.

=== As featured artist ===
Title	Year	Album
"Come Home" (Tatted Swerve featuring Coi Leray)	2018	Non-album singles
"Games" (K Dos featuring Coi Leray)	2018	Non-album singles
"Scrapin' the Glass" (Yvng Scuba featuring Coi Leray)	2019	The Dive
"Froze" (G-Wreck featuring Coi Leray)	2019	Non-album singles
"Watch My Drip" (Mike Rosa featuring Coi Leray)	2019	Non-album singles
"Sticky" (Keke Palmer featuring Coi Leray)	2019	Virgo Tendencies, Pt. 1
"Flip It" (Hotspot XD featuring Coi Leray, AlmightyHeezy, and Kelow Latesha)	2019	Non-album singles
"Lost in Time" (Wifisfuneral featuring Coi Leray)	2020	Pain?
"American Deli" (Chavo featuring Coi Leray)	2020	Non-album singles
"Contagious" (Lil Keyu featuring Coi Leray)	2020	Non-album singles
"Pose" (MCM Raymond featuring Coi Leray)	2021	Love Me Yet
"Gimmy Licky" (Rek Banga featuring Coi Leray)	2021	Non-album singles
"Thieves in Atlanta" (Yung Bleu featuring Coi Leray)	2021	Non-album singles
"Brown Eyes" (Esther featuring Coi Leray)	2021	Non-album singles
"Tomboy" (Destiny Rogers featuring Coi Leray)	2021	Non-album singles
"No More Stress" (Alrahim Wright III featuring Coi Leray)	2021	Non-album singles
"All About Cake" (KyleYouMadeThat featuring Coi Leray and Kaash Paige)	2021	Non-album singles
"Attachments" (Pressa featuring Coi Leray)	2021	Gardner Express (Deluxe)
"Freaky Deaky" (Enchanting featuring Coi Leray)	2021	No Luv
"Boss Bitch" (Rich the Kid featuring Coi Leray)	2021	Non-album single
"Triple S" (Remix) (YN Jay featuring Coi Leray)	2021	Coochie Chronicles
"2055" (Remix) (Sleepy Hallow featuring Coi Leray)	2021	Still Sleep? (Deluxe)
"Ocean Prime" (Bfb Da Packman featuring Coi Leray)	2021	Fat Niggas Need Love Too
"Upnow" (DD Osama featuring Coi Leray)	2023	Here 2 Stay
"Nonsense (Remix)" (Sabrina Carpenter featuring Coi Leray)	2023	Non-album singles
"Flip a Switch (Remix)" (Raye featuring Coi Leray)	2023	Non-album singles
"Pretty Girls Walk (Remix)" (Big Boss Vette featuring Coi Leray)	2023	Non-album singles
"Femme Fatale" (G-Eazy featuring Coi Leray & Kaliii)	2024	Freak Show
"Flava" (Shenseea featuring Coi Leray)	2024	Never Gets Late Here
"Not In The Store" (Doodles featuring Coi Leray & Pharrell Williams)	2024	Non-album single
"Tricks For You" (Honey Bxby featuring Coi Leray)	2025	Raw Honey

== Other charted songs ==
List of other charted songs, with selected chart positions and certifications
Title	Year	Peak chart positions									Certifications	Album
Title	Year	US	US R&B/HH	US Rap	AUS	CAN	KOR	NZ	UK	WW	Certifications	Album
"I Like" (YSL Records featuring Karlae and Coi Leray)	2021	— (Note: "I Like" did not enter the Billboard Hot 100, but peaked at number 19 on the Bubbling Under Hot 100 chart.)	—	—	—	—	—	—	—	—		Slime Language 2
"Happy Fools" (Tomorrow X Together featuring Coi Leray)	2023	—	—	—	—	—	86	—	—	—		The Name Chapter: Temptation
"Self Love" (with Metro Boomin)	2023	54	17	15	41	40	—	29	—	58	ARIA: Gold	Spider-Man: Across the Spider-Verse (Soundtrack from and Inspired by the Motion Picture)
"—" denotes releases that did not chart or were not released in that region.

== Guest appearances ==
Title	Year	Other artist(s)	Album
"No Longer Mine"	2018	—N/a	VFiles Loud (Vol. 1: All Girls)
"Save the Day"	2018	Ski Mask the Slump God, Jacquees, LouGotCash	Spider-Man: Into the Spider-Verse (Soundtrack From & Inspired by the Motion Picture)
"Kill Us"	2019	Von Prospa	Say What You Will
"Everything BoZ"	2019	Trippie Redd	!
"Run It Up"	2020	Martianonthebeat	The Cure
"Mixed Emotions"	2020	TyFontaine	We Ain't the Same
"Impatient"	2021	DDG, OG Parker	Die 4 Respect
"I Like"	2021	YSL Records, Karlae	Slime Language 2
"Cuffin"	2021	Lonr	Land of Nothing Real 2
"Push Start"	2021	French Montana, 42 Dugg	They Got Amnesia
"What's My Name"	2022	Fivio Foreign, Queen Naija	B.I.B.L.E.
"Rich Bitch"	2022	DDG, Lakeyah	It's Not Me It's You (Deluxe)
"Woman of the Year"	2022	Calvin Harris, Stefflon Don, Chlöe	Funk Wav Bounces Vol. 2
"Happy Fools"	2023	Tomorrow X Together	The Name Chapter: Temptation
"Self Love"	2023	Metro Boomin	Spider-Man: Across the Spider-Verse (Soundtrack from and Inspired by the Motion Picture)
