= Aton Ben-Horin =

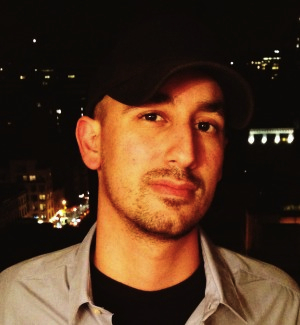
- Aton Ben-Horin headshot in NYC skyline. Taken March 31, 2013

Background information
- Born: October 11, 1979 (age 46); Miami, FL
- Origin: Los Angeles
- Occupations: Record executive, producer, songwriter, music manager, A&R
- Label: Warner Music Group
- Website: X.com/Aton

Aton Ben-Horin (born October 11, 1979) is an American record executive, record producer and music manager. As of June 10, 2016, he serves as Global Vice President of A&R for all of Warner Music Group's labels, including Atlantic Records and Warner Bros. Records. Ben-Horin is also the owner of Plush Recording Studios.

Ben-Horin initially began his career as a musician and songwriter in a touring rock band, Atomic Tangerine, sharing the stage with acts such as Simple Plan and Jimmy Eat World. he then ventured into the dance music scene and began DJing and producing dance music, under the name DJ 8on. He headlined the BreakBeat stage at Ultra Music Festival, radio mix shows, and local music venues. In August 2007, Aton opened Plush Recording Studios, which has developed into one of the premier Florida recording studios, with clients such as Nicki Minaj, Flo Rida, Justin Bieber, and Chris Brown, to name a few. Through his production and songwriting team, The Agency, Aton has produced and licensed a catalog of songs with the likes of John Legend, Rick Ross, Ciara, and many more. Through Plush Management LLC, he signed YouTube sensation Avery in 2010 and secured her a major record deal with Universal Motown. His multi-faceted path soon led him to A&R. In 2012, Aton began doing A&R at Warner Music Group, under Mike Caren (worldwide president of A&R, Warner Music Group).

Since joining Warner Music Group, Aton has delivered hit singles for Cardi B, David Guetta, Jason Derulo, Flo Rida, and more. Some of his most recent successes include Cardi B's "Ring" (feat. Kehlani), Flo Rida's "My House" and "G.D.F.R." Jason Derulo's "Talk Dirty" and "Wiggle," David Guetta's "Hey Mama" (featuring Nicki Minaj and Bebe Rexha) and "Bad" (featuring Showtek and Vassy). Aton is also responsible for signing various acts at Warner, including Alec Benjamin, Bhad Bhabie, Goody Grace, Jax, Justin Quiles, Tokischa, and others. His current management roster includes JVKE, Coi Leray, Johnny Goldstein, The Monarch, and Jakke Erixson.

== Discography ==
=== Partial Discography ===
Artist	Title	Album	Year	Credit
Forrest Frank, JVKE	"Never Get Used to This"	Child of God	2024	Manager
Karol G, Tiësto	"Contigo"	Contigo	2024	A&R
Surfaces, JVKE	"Don't Let Me Down"	Don't Let Me Down	2024	Manager
JVKE, Pink Sweat$	"Lavender (feat. Pink Sweat$"	Lavender	2024	Manager
Sam Feldt, Anitta, JVKE	"Mi Amor"	Mi Amor	2024	Manager
Alec Benjamin	"I Sent My Therapist To Therapy," "Different Kind Of Beautiful," "Pick Me," "Ways To Go (feat. Khalid)," "12 Notes," "Sacrifice Tomorrow," "The Arsonist," "Lead Me To Water," "By Now," "King Size Bed," "Love The Ones Who Leave," "In A Little"	12 Notes	2024	A&R
JVKE	"This is Slow Dancing Feels Like"	This is What Slow Dancing Feels Like	2024	Manager
JVKE	"Clouds"	Clouds	2024	Manager
JVKE	"This is What Winter Feels Like"	This is Winter Feels Like	2024	Manager
Alan Walker, YUQI, JVKE	"Fire!"	Fire!	2023	Manager
Jimin of BTS, Kodak Black, NLE Choppa, JVKE, Muni Long	"Angel Pt. 1 (feat.Jimin of BTS, JVKE, & Muni Long"	Fast & Furious: TheFastSaga (Soundtrack)	2023	Manager
JVKE	"This is What Space Feels Like"	This is What Space Feels Like	2023	Manager
JVKE	"This is What Autumn Feels Like"	This is What Autumn Feels Like	2023	Manager
Coi Leray	"Players," "Bops," "Make My Day (with David Guetta),"Get Loud," "Bitch Girl," "My Body," "Phuck It," "Spend It (with Saucy Santana)," "On My Way," "Run It Up," "Man's World (with James Brown)," "Don't Chat Me Up (with Giggs)," "No Angels (with Lola Brooke)"	COI	2023	Executive Producer
Jax	"Cinderella Snapped"	Cinderella Snapped	2023	A&R
JVKE	"Golden Hour"	This is What__Feels Like	2022	Manager
Jax	"Victoria's Secret"	Victoria's Secret	2022	A&R
Lauren Spencer Smith	"Fingers Crossed"	Mirror	2022	Manager
JVKE	"This Is What Falling In Love Feels Like"	This is What__Feels Like	2022	Manager
Black Eyed Peas, Shakira, David Guetta	"Don't You Worry"	Don't You Worry	2022	Manager
Tiesto, Karol G	"Don't Be Shy"	Drive	2021	A&R
Jax	"Like My Father"	Like My Father	2021	A&R
Justin Quiles, Chimbala, Zion & Lennox	"Loco"	La Última Promesa	2021	A&R
Jax	"90's Kids"	90's Kids	2021	A&R
Jax	"Ring Pop"	Ring Pop	2021	A&R
KILLBOY	"U+ME"	U+ME	2021	A&R
Jason Derulo	"Take You Dancing"	Take You Dancing	2020	A&R
JVKE	"Upside Down"	Upside Down	2020	Manager
Ava Max	"Kings & Queens"	Kings & Queens	2020	A&R
Alec Benjamin	"Match In The Rain", "Oh My God", "Mind is a Prison", "Jesus in LA"	These Two Windows	2020	A&R
Goody Grace, Blink 182	"Scumbag" (feat. Blink-182)	Scumbag (feat. Blink-182)	2019	A&R
Bhad Bhabie, Megan Thee Stallion	"Bestie" (feat. Megan Thee Stallion)	Bestie	2019	A&R
Bhad Bhabie, Kodak Black	"Bestie" (feat. Kodak Black)	Bestie	2019	A&R
Bhad Bhabie, Tory Lanez	"BabyFace Savage" (feat. Tory Lanez)	BabyFace Savage	2019	A&R
Justin Quiles	"DJ No Pare" (feat. Zion, Natti Natasha, Farruko, Dalex, Lenny Tavarez)	DJ No Pare	2019	A&R
Alec Benjamin	"If We Have Each Other"	If We Have Each Other	2018	A&R
Bhad Bhabie, Lil Baby	"Geek'd" (feat. Lil Baby)	15	2019	A&R
Alex Hepburn	"Take Me Home To Mama"	Things I've Seen	2019	Co-Writer, A&R
Bhad Bhabie, Ty Dolla $ign	"Trust Me" (feat. Ty Dolla $ign)	Trust Me	2018	A&R
Alec Benjamin	"Let Me Down Slowly"	Narrated For You	2018	A&R
Alec Benjamin	"Water Fountain"	Narrated For You	2018	A&R
Flo Rida	"Dancer"	Dancer	2018	A&R
Goody Grace	"Two Shots" (feat. Gnash)	Infinite	2018	A&R
Bhad Bhabie	"Gucci Flip Flops" (feat. Lil Yachty)	Gucci Flip Flops	2018	A&R
Cardi B	"Ring" (feat. Kehlani)	Invasion of Privacy	2018	A&R
David Guetta	"Battle" (feat. Faouzia)	7	2018	A&R
Flo Rida, Maluma	"Hola" (feat. Maluma)	Hola	2017	A&R
Bhad Bhabie	"Mama Don't Worry" (Still Ain't Dirty)	Mama Don't Worry	2017	A&R
Bhad Bhabie	"I Got It", "Wachu Know", "Hi Bich", "These Heaux"	singles	2017	A&R
Jason Derulo	"Want to Want Me", "Cheyenne", "Get Ugly", "Pull Up", "Love Like That" (feat. K. Michelle), ""Painkiller" (feat. Meghan Trainor), "Broke" (feat. Stevie Wonder and Pusha T), "Try Me" (feat. Jennifer Lopez and Matoma), "Love Me Down", "Trade Hearts" (feat. Julia Michaels), "X2CU"	Everything is 4	2015	A&R, Vocal Production
Flo Rida	"I Don't Like It I Love It (feat. Robin Thicke)", "That's What I Like (feat. Fitz)", "Here It Is (feat. Chris Brown)", "Once In A Lifetime", "Wobble"	My House	2015	A&R, Vocal Production
Wiz Khalifa	"See You Again" (feat. Charlie Puth)	Fast & Furious 7 Soundtrack	2015	Background vocals
Flo Rida & 99 Percent	"Cake"	Cake	2017	A&R
Flo Rida	"My House"	My House	2015	A&R
Flo Rida, Sage the Gemini	"G.D.F.R" (feat. Sage the Gemini)	My House	2015	A&R, Vocal Production
Jason Derulo	"Wiggle" ft. Snoop Dogg	Talk Dirty	2014	A&R
Jason Derulo	"Talk Dirty" ft. 2 Chainz	Talk Dirty / Tattoos	2014	A&R
Jason Derulo	"Bubblegum" ft. Tyga	Talk Dirty	2014	A&R
Jason Derulo	"Kama Sutra" ft. Kid Ink	Talk Dirty	2014	A&R
David Guetta	"Hey Mama" (featuring Nicki Minaj and Afrojack)	Listen	2014	A&R
Jake Miller	"Party In The Penthouse"	Dazed and Confused EP	2014	A&R
Jake Miller	"First Flight Home"	First Flight Home	2014	Co-Writer, A&R
David Guetta & Showtek	"Bad" ft. Vassy	Bad	2014	A&R
Jason Derulo	"Talk Dirty" ft. 2 Chainz	Talk Dirty / Tattoos	2014	A&R
Avery	"Love Me or Let Me Go"	Love Me or Let Me Go	2010	Co-Producer, co-Writer, Guitarist, Vocal Producer
