= Bobby I Love You, Purrr =

Reality TV show

- Genre: Reality
- Country of origin: United States
- Original language: English
- No. of seasons: 1
- No. of episodes: 14

Production
- Executive producers: Lemuel Plummer; Jason L. Tolbert; Bobby Lytes; Rolling Ray; Jason Lee; Mark Scheibal; Tameka Stevenson
- Production location: Miami
- Running time: 45–47 minutes

Original release
- Network: Zeus Network
- Release: August 21 – November 28, 2022

Bobby I Love You, Purrr is a reality television LGBT dating show, starring Love & Hip Hop: Miami's Bobby Lytes and viral video personality Rolling Ray. Lytes and Ray serve as the show's executive producers, along with Love & Hip Hop: Hollywood's Jason Lee. The show premiered on August 21, 2022 on Zeus Network.

== Development ==
Bobby Nico Wade, known professionally as Bobby Lytes, is a rapper and the cousin of Trina. He is openly gay. He first came into prominence as a cast member of Love & Hip Hop: Miami. Wheelchair user, Raymond Harper, nicknamed "Rolling Ray", first garnered attention online for his appearances on the Catfish spin-off Catfish: Trolls and Divorce Court.

Ray and Lytes feuded online, leading to a confrontation which aired as a two-part episode of The Conversation on November 7 and November 14, 2021. On May 17, 2022, Zeus Network announced that the two would reunite for a dating show, in which Ray would help Lytes find love.

== Contestants ==
15 men compete for Bobby's affections, most notably professional basketball player Grandy Glaze, Bahamian track-and-field athlete Jameson Strachan and André Marhold, professional basketball player and ex-boyfriend of Jeffree Star.

Contestant	Nickname	Age	Outcome	Final Ep. #
Jameson Strachan	Island Boi	34	Winner	11
André Marhold	ReRun	31	Runner-up	11
Grandy Glaze	Hercules	30	Eliminated during 7th elimination ceremony	10
Earl "Cash" Roberts	Go Hard	29	Eliminated during 7th elimination ceremony	10
Bakari Kyle	Ding-a-Ling	27	Walked before 7th elimination ceremony	9
Mikey Bursese	Crouton	26	Eliminated during 6th elimination ceremony	8
Perry Lambert	Big Burr	36	Eliminated during 5th elimination ceremony	7
Ike Chatman	Trackz	33	Eliminated during 5th elimination ceremony	7
Terrall "Rell" Walker	Savage	27	Eliminated during 4th elimination ceremony	6
Zacharyah Pittman	Soul	28	Eliminated during 4th elimination ceremony	6
Christopher "Krush" Reyes	Kolgate	30	Eliminated during 3rd elimination ceremony	5
Tony Perez	Hot Wheelz	31	Eliminated during 3rd elimination ceremony	5
Cameron Greer	Miss Mamas	29	Eliminated during 2nd elimination ceremony	4
Alexander Mason	TBD	28	Eliminated during 2nd elimination ceremony	4
Dimitri Costas	—N/a	25	Walked before 1st elimination ceremony	3

== Call-out order ==
Color key
Contestant wins competition
Contestant is the runner-up
Contestant is in the bottom 2 of the elimination ceremony
Contestant is eliminated from the competition
Contestant quits the competition

Order	Elimination ceremony (Note: The first elimination ceremony begins in episode 3 and concludes in episode 4. Subsequent episodes always end in an elimination ceremony (eg second elimination ceremony shown in episode 4, third ceremony shown in episode 5 etc.).)							
Order	1	2	3	4	5	6	7	8
1	Hercules		Island Boi	Trackz	ReRun	Island Boi		Island Boi
2	Trackz	Crouton	Soul	Big Burr	Ding-a-Ling	ReRun		ReRun
3	Big Burr			Crouton	Hercules	Go Hard	Hercules	—N/a
4	Kolgate	Ding-a-Ling			Island Boi	Hercules	Go Hard	—N/a
5	Ding-a-Ling	Trackz	Go Hard	Hercules	Crouton	Ding-a-Ling	Ding-a-Ling	—N/a
6	Go Hard	ReRun		Go Hard	Go Hard (Note: Contestant is initially eliminated before Bobby changes his mind and lets him stay in competition.)	Crouton	—N/a	
7	Soul	Go Hard	Hercules	ReRun	Big Burr	—N/a		
8	Crouton	Savage		Island Boi	Trackz	—N/a		
9	Miss Mamas	Soul	Crouton	Savage	—N/a			
10	Savage	Island Boi	Trackz	Soul	—N/a			
11	ReRun	Kolgate	Kolgate	—N/a				
12	Hot Wheelz	Hot Wheelz	Hot Wheelz	—N/a				
13	TBD	Miss Mamas	—N/a					
14	Island Boi	TBD	—N/a					
15	Dimitri	—N/a						

== Episodes ==
No. overall	No. in season	Title	Original release date
1	1	"Welcome to Miami"	August 21, 2022
The boys arrive to the mansion to compete for Bobby's love, and immediately break out into a brawl on the front steps. Jason surprises Bobby by inviting Bobby's old flame, André. guest stars: Jason Lee
2	2	"Don't Fall for It, Bobby – Part 1"	August 28, 2022
Chaos ensues as the fights between the boys continue into the night and over the next day. guest stars: Jason Lee
3	3	"Don't Fall for It, Bobby – Part 2"	September 4, 2022
After getting ganged up on by the entire house, Dimitri quits the show. Rolling Ray and Hot Wheelz get into an altercation in their wheelchairs. Once everything claims down, the boys get their nicknames. At the first elimination ceremony, Bobby exposes Island Boi for hooking up with Hot Wheelz' handler.
4	4	"I Can't Swim"	September 11, 2022
The boys do a pool challenge, but not all of them can swim. At the second elimination ceremony, TBD and Miss Mamas are eliminated.
5	5	"It Better Give Seduction"	September 18, 2022
The boys do a pole-dancing challenge, where Bobby gets blackout drunk and unleashes on Hot Wheelz for not keeping his handler in check. At the third elimination ceremony, Hot Wheelz and Kolgate are eliminated. guest stars: Joseline Hernandez
6	6	"Call Her Now"	September 25, 2022
Bobby goes through each of the boys' phones, but not all of them want to share their secrets. At the fourth elimination ceremony, Soul and Savage are eliminated.
7	7	"Stay Soft"	October 2, 2022
The boys do a boxing challenge, but Bobby is disappointed when some of them don't give it their all. At the fifth elimination ceremony, Big Burr and Trackz are eliminated. guest stars: Safaree Samuels, Natalie Nunn
8	8	"Tastes Like You"	October 9, 2022
Bobby tricks the boys into going on a date with Rolling Ray. At the sixth elimination ceremony, Crouton is eliminated.
9	9	"Why Should I Pick You?"	October 16, 2022
Ding-a-Ling is forced to quit the show after he falls ill and is hospitalised. Bobby goes on one-and-one dates with the four remaining boys.
10	10	"And Then There Were Two"	October 23, 2022
At the seventh elimination ceremony, Go Hard and Hercules are eliminated. Bobby goes on his final dates with Island Boi and ReRun before making his decision.
11	11	"This Is Closure"	October 30, 2022
Bobby has one last sit-down with the top 2. Ultimately, he chooses Island Boi over ReRun.
12	12	"The Reunion – Part 1"	November 13, 2022
13	13	"The Reunion – Part 2"	November 20, 2022
14	14	"The Reunion – Part 3"	November 28, 2022
