= Rolling Ray =

American influencer (1996–2025)

- Rolling Ray in 2021
- Born: Raymond Harper; September 5, 1996; Washington, D.C., U.S.
- Died: September 3, 2025 (aged 28); Maryland, U.S.
- Occupations: Influencer; media personality
- Years active: 2018–2025

Raymond Harper (September 5, 1996 – September 3, 2025), known professionally as Rolling Ray, was an American influencer and media personality. He first found popularity on Instagram and was known for his catchphrases "it's giving" and "purrr". He also found fame through his one-off appearances on the reality television series Catfish: Trolls (2018) and on the court show Divorce Court (2019). He hosted and executive produced the Zeus Network reality dating show Bobby I Love You, Purrr (2022).

== Career ==
=== Social media ===
A video of Rolling Ray negatively reviewing Popeyes' chicken sandwich in 2019, in which he called it a waste of his money and said, "It's not even giving what y'all said it was supposed to gave," went viral online and coined the popular online phrase "it's giving". Rolling Ray also coined the term "purrr" in a 2020 YouTube video, a variation of the term "period" which saw widespread usage as slang to express approval, particularly on TikTok. By 2021, he had become popular through his Instagram account, @iamrollingray, where he had more than 445 thousand followers by 2025.

=== Reality television ===
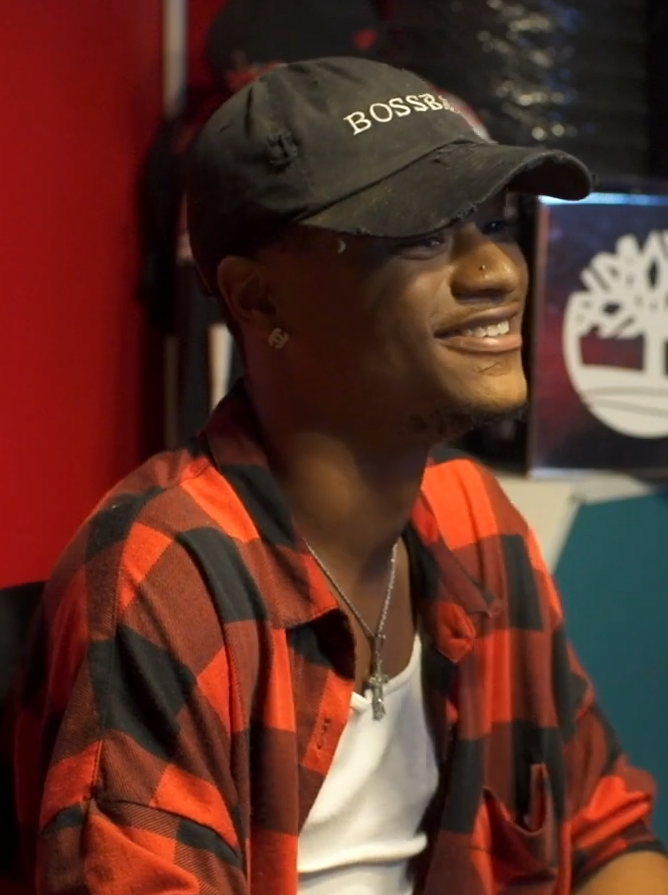
Rolling Ray appeared on an episode of the 2018 reality television series Catfish: Trolls with fellow social media personality Camyonce (pictured).

Rolling Ray appeared on the second episode of the short-lived MTV reality television series Catfish: Trolls, a spinoff of Catfish: The TV Show, which aired in July 2018. He appeared in the episode as the "troll" of fellow social media personality Camyonce, whom he had previously argued with over Camyonce's love of rapper Nicki Minaj and falsely publicly accused of having AIDS on social media in 2016. In 2019, Rolling Ray appeared on the "Harper vs. McCormick" episode of the court show Divorce Court, then hosted by Lynn Toler, with his high school boyfriend, Christian McCormick, whom he insulted in the episode as "really terrible". CJ Clements of the radio station KTDY referred to it as potentially "the most hilariously weird, real, unscripted, yet ridiculous thing you've ever seen on television" in 2021 and Collider ranked it at the top of their 2023 list of the "wildest" court show moments. Rolling Ray's appearance on the episode went viral and brought him to wider fame.

In 2022, Rolling Ray hosted and executive produced the Zeus Network reality dating show Bobby I Love You, Purrr, in which contestants competed to become media personality Bobby Lytes's boyfriend. Rolling Ray and Lytes had previously appeared in a 2021 episode of the Zeus Network series The Conversation focused on a social media feud between them. Mike Therkelsen of Instinct noted that the series was "the first gay dating show in a long time" by 2022.

=== Other endeavors ===
Rolling Ray released the song "BigPurrrr", a diss track against rapper Coi Leray for using his catchphrase "purrr" in her single "Big Purr (Prrdd)", in 2021. He modeled in Telfar and UGG's ad campaign for their Krinkle collaboration in October 2023.

== Personal life and public image ==
Rolling Ray was openly gay. He had spinal muscular atrophy type 3 and used a wheelchair. He was born and based in Washington, D.C. New York called Rolling Ray "one of America's great wordsmiths" in 2022. Following his death, Ittai Sopher of WUSA described his image on Instagram as having been centered on "flamboyant glamor and unabashed self-confidence".

After Rolling Ray posted in January 2022 that he had contracted COVID-19, he did not post for several months on social media, causing rumors of his death to circulate online. In April of that year, he posted a video on Instagram to shut down the rumors, in which he said, "It never gave dead," wore a haircut with the words "not dead" inscribed, and announced that he had been comatose.

In August 2022, in response to the launch of rapper Doja Cat's It's Giving clothing collection, which displayed the titular phrase across much of its merchandise and used it in a promotional video for the collection, Rolling Ray tweeted accusations that she had stolen the phrase from him. Twitter users also asked her to credit him and shared documents showing that she had filed a trademark for the phrase a year prior. He then wrote that her tweet asking him to check his direct messages was "giving what's supposed to be gave". He also tweeted in response to Kourtney Kardashian's vitamin supplement brand Lemme releasing Purr, a gummy vitamin for vaginal health, that she was "tak[ing] from the black community again" and accused her of stealing the name of the brand from him.

== Death ==
Rolling Ray died on September 3, 2025, aged 28. It was reported to the office of Maryland's chief medical examiner the same day, though his body was not brought into the office for an autopsy. His cause of death was natural cause. His death was confirmed by Zeus Network on their Instagram account, where they posted a tribute to him. Rapper Cardi B also tweeted a tribute to him, writing that he was "a menace" who "changed soo much and became so positive", adding, "You will truly be missed BIG PURRRR!!!" A week after his death, his family posted on his Instagram account, warning of scammers masquerading as his family members and asking for money for his funeral.

== Filmography ==
Year	Title	Role	Notes
2018	Catfish: Trolls	Himself	Episode: "Camyonce & Rolling Ray"
2019	Divorce Court	Himself	Episode: "Harper vs. McCormick: #InMyFeelings"
2021	The Conversation	Himself	Episode: "Bobby Lytes & Rolling Ray"
2022	Bobby I Love You, Purrr	Host	Also executive producer
