= Rocco Did It Again! =

American record producer (born 1984)

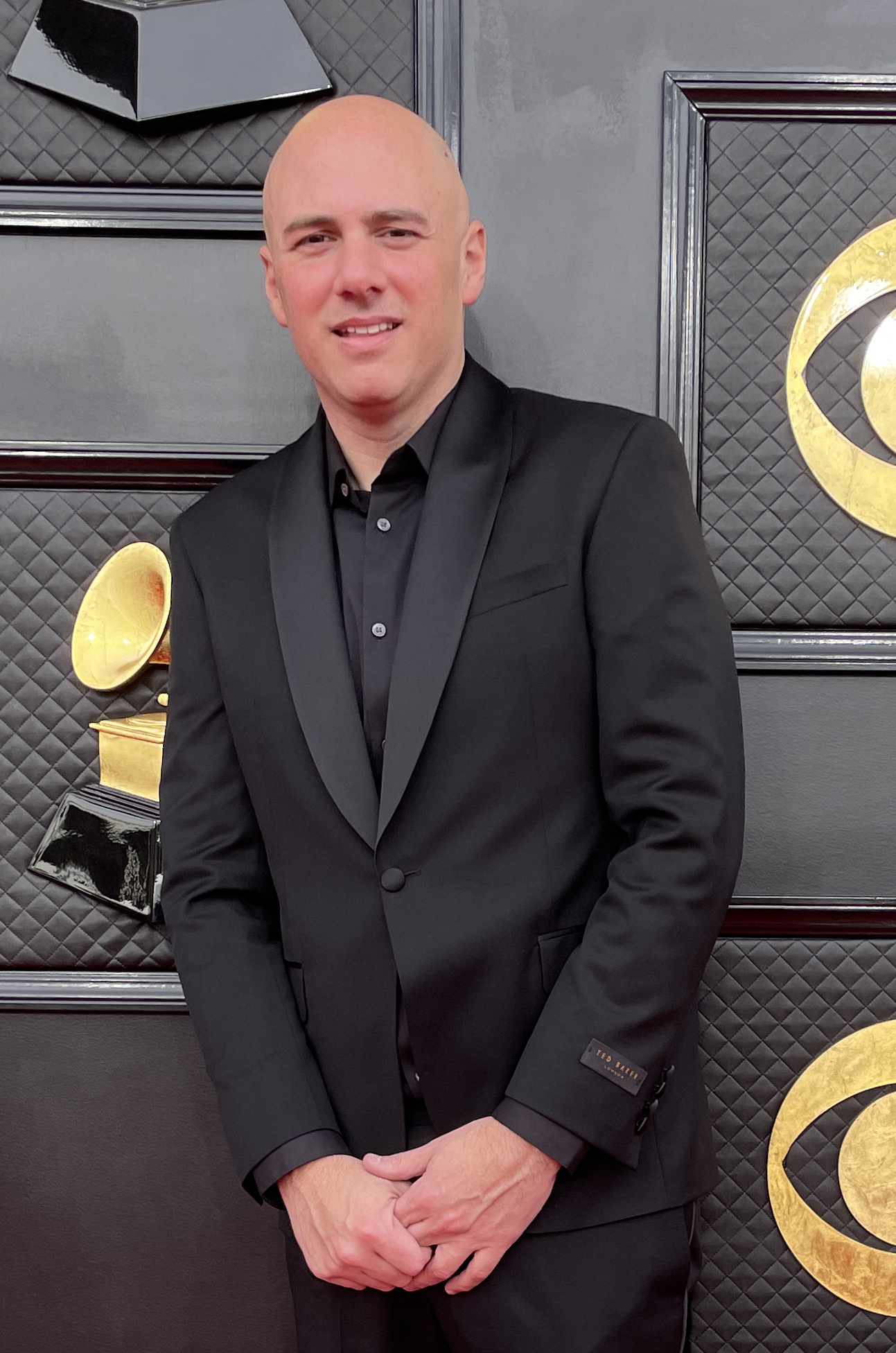
- Rocco Did It Again! at the 2022 Grammy Awards

Background information
- Also known as: Roc
- Born: Rocco Valdes; October 2, 1984 (age 41); Hialeah, Florida, U.S.
- Occupations: Record producer; songwriter; music publisher; record executive
- Years active: 2002–present
- Labels: 21Summer; Def Jam; Chase
- Publisher: Prescription Songs

Rocco Valdes (born 2 October 1984), known professionally as Rocco Did It Again!, is an American record producer, songwriter, music publisher, and music executive from Hialeah, Florida. Valdes co-founded the record label Chase Records (or Chase Entertainment) in 2004, which has been credited with signing American singers T-Pain and Austin Mahone prior to their mainstream breakthroughs; Valdes remained the former's manager after his departure in favor of a major label, while the latter's record deal—first signed in 2012—led to a joint venture with Republic Records and Cash Money Records the following year. By 2018, he served as talent manager for fellow Floridian, rapper 9lokkNine.

== Early life ==
Rocco was born in Hialeah, Florida, where he attended Hialeah-Miami Lakes Senior High School. After High School, Valdes developed an interest in music and decided to attend Full Sail University in Winter Park, Florida. Initially, Valdes wanted to be a music engineer, but decided to he was more intrigued by the business side of music, only to find himself back on the technical side of music later in his career.

== Career ==
Valdes began his career in 2002 at Def Jam Recordings, where he worked as an A&R assistant for two years. In 2004, Valdes discovered American singer T-Pain and managed his career in a joint venture with RCA Records for ten years. In 2012, Valdes signed pop singer Austin Mahone to his first recording contract in a joint venture with Universal Republic Records, and later Cash Money Records the following year. In 2018, he became the manager of Orlando, Florida-based rapper 9lokkNine. He produced his song "223's" (featuring YNW Melly), which was released commercially the following year as Melly's single; where it then reached at number 34 on the Billboard Hot 100 chart. That same year, Valdes shifted focus onto further work in production and songwriting.

In the following years, he has been credited on the singles "Jump" by DaBaby, "Tick Tock" by Young Thug, "Alone" by Kim Petras and Nicki Minaj, and "Blick Blick" by Coi Leray. He produced and co-wrote Saweetie's 2021 single "Best Friend", which became a hit on the Billboard Hot 100 and Hot R&B/Hip-Hop Songs, peaked on the Rhythmic chart, and was nominated for Best Rap Song at the 64th Annual Grammy Awards. He has contributed to Lil Durk's 2023 single "All My Life", which won Best Melodic Rap Performance at the 65th Annual Grammy Awards.

== Charted singles ==
List of singles as either producer or co-producer, with selected chart positions and certifications, showing year released, performing artists and album nameList of singles written or co-written for other artists
Title	Year	Peak chart positions										Certifications	Album
Title	Year	US	US R&B/HH	US Rap	UK	AUS	CAN	GER	IRE	SWI	NZ	Certifications	Album
"223's" (YNW Melly featuring 9lokkNine)	2019	34	17	14	69	27	53	38	69	—	38	RIAA: 2× Platinum	Melly vs. Melvin
"Jump" (DaBaby featuring YoungBoy Never Broke Again)	2020	17	9	6	—	—	62	—	77	—	12	RIAA: Gold	Blame It on Baby
"Best Friend" (Saweetie featuring Doja Cat)	2021	14	6	6	16	25	39	1	36	96	39	RIAA: 4× Platinum	Pretty Bitch Music
"Tick Tock" {Young Thug}	2021	96	—	37	—	—	—	34	—	—	34		
"Blick Blick" (Coi Leray featuring Nicki Minaj)	2022	37	10	10	71	—	68	—	—	—	10	RIAA: Gold	Trendsetter
"Pretty Girl Era" (Lu Kala)	2023	—	—	—	—	—	49	—	—	—	—	RIAA: Gold	
"Lottery" (Latto featuring Lu Kala)	2023	83	9	29	32	62	15	—	—	—	32		
"Alone" (Kim Petras featuring Nicki Minaj)	2023	55	—	—	37	—	32	—	35	17	4		Feed the Beast (Kim Petras album)
"All My Life" (Lil Durk featuring J. Cole)	2023	2	1	1	6	7	11	—	23	—	11	RIAA: 2× Platinum	Almost Healed
"Stand By Me" (Lil Durk featuring Morgan Wallen)	2023	22	8	8	—	—	27	—	—	—	5	RIAA: Platinum	Almost Healed
"Cowgirl" (Nicki Minaj featuring Lourdiz)	2023	87	—	23	—	—	—	—	—	—	—		Pink Friday 2
"Woman's World" (Katy Perry)	2024	63	—	—	47	—	77	4	65	9	6		"143 (Katy Perry album)"
"—" denotes a recording that did not chart or was not released in that territory.

== Discography (producer/composer) ==
List of songs as either producer or composerList of songs written or co-written for other artists
Title	Year	Artist	Album
Break It In (featuring Ski Mask the Slump God)	2026	Trippie Redd	NDA (album)
Would You (featuring Tarzzan, Jo Woo-chan)	2026	Taeyang	Quintessence
Me and My	2026	Blackpink	Deadline
Up (featuring Trippie Redd)	2025	Seyi Vibez	Fuji Moto
Heavyweight	2025	JNR Choi	
Work	2025	Lu Kala	No Tears On This Ride
I'm His He's Mine (featuring Doechii)	2024	Katy Perry	143
Gimme Gimme (featuring 21 Savage)	2024	Katy Perry	143
Gorgeous (featuring Kim Petras)	2024	Katy Perry	143
Crush	2024	Katy Perry	143
Has a Heart	2024	Katy Perry	143
No Tears For New Years	2024	Katy Perry	143
I Woke Up	2024	Katy Perry	143
Nirvana	2024	Katy Perry	143
Truth	2024	Katy Perry	143
Artificial (featuring JID)	2024	Katy Perry	143
Lifetimes	2024	Katy Perry	143
Woman's World	2024	Katy Perry	143
Cobwebs	2024	BLP Kosher	Scarecrow
Who's Gonna	2024	Lu Kala	
Gag On It	2024	Kim Petras	Slut Pop Miami
Banana Boat	2024	Kim Petras	Slut Pop Miami
Get Fucked	2024	Kim Petras	Slut Pop Miami
Rim Job	2024	Kim Petras	Slut Pop Miami
Cockblocker	2024	Kim Petras	Slut Pop Miami
Butt Slutt	2024	Kim Petras	Slut Pop Miami
Head Head Honcho	2024	Kim Petras	Slut Pop Miami
Can We Fuck	2024	Kim Petras	Slut Pop Miami
Whale Cock	2024	Kim Petras	Slut Pop Miami
Cowgirl (featuring Lourdiz)	2023	Nicki Minaj	Pink Friday 2
Flashy (featuring Kim Petras)	2023	City Girls	R.A.W. (City Girls album)
Treat Me Like A Hoe	2023	Kim Petras	Problématique (album)
Make Up your Mind	2023	Cordae	
Stand By Me (featuring Morgan Wallen)	2023	Lil Durk	Almost Healed
All My Life (featuring J.Cole)	2023	Lil Durk	Almost Healed
On Fire	2023	Snow Wife	Queen Degenerate
I Can't Stop (featuring Omah Lay)	2023	Big Boss Vette	Spider-Man: Across the Spider-Verse (soundtrack)
Day One	2023	Tyga	
Alone (featuring Nicki Minaj)	2023	Kim Petras	
Georgia Peach	2023	Quinn XCII	The People's Champ
1-800 Bad Bitch	2023	Saucy Santana	
Problem	2023	Big Boss Vette	
Lottery (featuring Lu Kala)	2023	Latto	
Pretty Girls Walk	2023	Big Boss Vette	
Get it	2023	Big Boss Vette	
Dollas	2023	Big Boss Vette	
Pretty Girl Era	2023	Lu Kala	
Tick Tock	2022	JNR Choi	
Make Me	2022	Dirty Heads	Midnight Control
Blick Blick (featuring Nicki Minaj)	2022	Coi Leray	Trendsetter
Anxiety	2022	Coi Leray	Trendsetter
Throat Goat	2022	Kim Petras	Slut Pop
Super Power Bitch	2022	Kim Petras	Slut Pop
XXX	2022	Kim Petras	Slut Pop
Treat Me Like A Slut	2022	Kim Petras	Slut Pop
Slut Pop	2022	Kim Petras	Slut Pop
Wootie Woot	2022	A1 LaFlare	
Coconuts	2021	Kim Petras	
Icy Chain	2021	Saweetie	PBM
Tick Tock	2021	Young Thug	
Trouble	2021	347aidan	
Best Friend (featuring Doja Cat)	2021	Saweetie	
Jump (featuring Youngboy Never Broke Again)	2020	Da Baby	Blame It On Baby
Homeless Lottery	2020	347aidan	
Neighborhood	2020	Miles Wesley	
Boy Bye	2020	Big Klit	
223's (featuring 9lokkNine)	2019	YNW Melly	Melly vs. Melvin
Xmas Song	2018	9lokkNine	Lil Glokk That Stole Kristmas
Somebody Got Get It (featuring T-Pain)	2014	Timeflies	After Hours (Timeflies album)
You Da Shit	2011	Lil Wayne	
Sweat (featuring Lil Wayne)	2011	Bow Wow	I'm Better Than You
Orgullo	2010	Pitbull	Armando (album)
Impressed	2010	Maejor	Upside Down 2
Change (featuring Diddy, Akon and Mary J. Blige)	2008	T-Pain	Three Ringz
Long Lap Dance	2008	T-Pain	Three Ringz
Send Me An Email (featuringT-Pain)	2006	J-Shin	All I Got Is Love
