= Under Enemy Arms =

2019 song by Trippie Redd

Single by Trippie Redd

from the album !
- Released: May 29, 2019
- Genre: Hip hop; trap
- Length: 2:42
- Label: 10k; Caroline
- Songwriters: Michael White IV; Adrian Rupke; Matthew Crabtree
- Producers: Hammad Beats; Matthew Crabtree

Trippie Redd singles chronology
"Alright" (2019)	"Under Enemy Arms" (2019)	"Gone Girl" (2019)

Music video
- "Under Enemy Arms" on YouTube

"Under Enemy Arms" is a song by American rapper Trippie Redd. It was released as the lead single for his second studio album ! (2019) on May 29, 2019, with a accompanying music video. The song was produced by Hammad Beats and Matthew Crabtree. "Under Enemy Arms" peaked at number 94 on the Billboard Hot 100, giving Redd his tenth appearance on that chart.

== Music video ==
On May 29, 2019, Trippie Redd uploaded the music video for "Under Enemy Arms" on his own YouTube account. Directed by Christian Breslauer, the video features Redd conducting a press conference with reporters declaring war, then cuts to a battlefield where Redd (sporting red paint and battle gear), engages in multiple shootouts before ending with him lying down surrounded by fallen soldiers. The music video currently has 17 million views as of August 2026.

== Commercial performance ==
On the week ending June 15, 2019, "Under Enemy Arms" debuted at numbers 39 and 94 on both the Billboard Hot R&B/Hip-Hop Songs and Hot 100 charts respectively. On October 8, 2020, the song was certified gold by the RIAA in the US for over 500,000 units in sales and streams.

== Charts ==
Chart (2019)	Peak position
New Zealand Hot Singles (RMNZ)	11
US Billboard Hot 100	94
US Hot R&B/Hip-Hop Songs (Billboard)	39

== Certifications ==
Region	Certification	Certified units/sales
United States (RIAA)	Gold	500,000^{‡}
^{‡} Sales+streaming figures based on certification alone.
