= Gone Girl (Iann Dior song) =

2019 debut single by Iann Dior featuring Trippie Redd

Single by Iann Dior featuring Trippie Redd

from the album Industry Plant
- Released: July 4, 2019
- Genre: Emo rap
- Length: 2:16
- Label: 10K
- Songwriter(s): Michael Olmo; Michael White II; Nicholas Mira; Henry Nichols; Jared Scharff; Golden Von Jones; Danny Snodgrass Jr.
- Producer(s): Nick Mira; Pharaoh Vice; Pearl Lion

Iann Dior singles chronology
"Gone Girl" (2019)	"What is Real" (2019)

Trippie Redd singles chronology
"Under Enemy Arms" (2019)	"Gone Girl" (2019)	"Mac 10" (2019)

Music video
- "Gone Girl" on YouTube

"Gone Girl" is the debut single by American rapper and singer Iann Dior featuring fellow American rapper and singer Trippie Redd. Produced by Nick Mira, Pharaoh Vice, and Pearl Lion, it was released on July 4, 2019 as the lead single from the former's debut studio album Industry Plant.

== Background ==
In an interview with Genius, Iann Dior stated:

What inspired me to write this song was, I flew my ex out to LA to just see what would happen. And it was very hard for her to adjust to fame. So I ended up flying her back home and while she was gone, or as soon as she left, I was just like, "Fuck." I don't know, I was tripping and I had wrote this song and that's why I titled it "Gone Girl".

== Composition ==
The song is an "emo-twinged modern day rap" that features an uptempo beat and lyrics revolving around sadness, with Dior singing about a girl breaking his heart.

== Charts ==
Chart performance for "Gone Girl"
Chart (2019)	Peak position
New Zealand Hot Singles (RMNZ)	13

== Certifications ==
Certifications for "Gone Girl"
Region	Certification	Certified units/sales
Australia (ARIA)	Gold	35,000^{‡}
New Zealand (RMNZ)	Gold	15,000^{‡}
United States (RIAA)	Platinum	1,000,000^{‡}
^{‡} Sales+streaming figures based on certification alone.
