= Mac 10 (song) =

Single by Trippie Redd featuring Lil Baby and Lil Duke

Single by Trippie Redd featuring Lil Baby and Lil Duke

from the album !
- Released: July 24, 2019
- Genre: Hip hop; trap
- Length: 2:07
- Label: 10k; Caroline
- Songwriter(s): Michael White IV; Dominique Jones; Arnold Martinez; Wesley Glass; Robert Richardson
- Producer(s): Wheezy; Bobby Raps

Trippie Redd singles chronology
"Gone Girl" (2019)	"Mac 10" (2019)	"Love Me More" (2019)

Lil Baby singles chronology
"Baby" (2019)	"Mac 10" (2019)	"Tootsies" (2019)

Lil Duke singles chronology
"The One" (2019)	"Mac 10" (2019)

Music video
- "Mac 10" on YouTube

"Mac 10" is a song by American rapper Trippie Redd featuring fellow American rappers Lil Baby and Lil Duke. It was released as the second single from Redd's second studio album ! (2019) on July 24, 2019, with an accompanying music video. The song was written by the artists alongside producers Wheezy and Bobby Raps.

== Background ==
Trippie Redd debuted the song at one of his concerts in March 2019, performing it with Lil Duke. The title of the song references the MAC-10 machine pistol. In an interview with Zane Lowe, Redd talked about his collaboration with Duke and Lil Baby, saying:

Baby was sleep on the couch and Duke was up with me, we were just smoking and vibing then Wheezy came in the studio, I asked him for a beat. I did the chorus, Duke got on it then I woke Baby's ass up told him to record his shit… He took damn near 30 minutes but he woke up out his sleep and got that out the way.

== Charts ==
Chart (2019)	Peak position
Canada (Canadian Hot 100)	93
New Zealand Hot Singles (RMNZ)	30
US Billboard Hot 100	64
US Hot R&B/Hip-Hop Songs (Billboard)	24

== Certifications ==
Region	Certification	Certified units/sales
United States (RIAA)	Platinum	1,000,000^{‡}
^{‡} Sales+streaming figures based on certification alone.
