= Tick Tock (Young Thug song) =

2021 single by Young Thug

Single by Young Thug
- Released: August 20, 2021
- Genre: Hip hop
- Length: 2:39
- Label: YSL; 300
- Songwriter(s): Jeffery Williams; Lukasz Gottwald; Rocco Valdes
- Producer(s): Dr. Luke; Rocco Did It Again!

Young Thug singles chronology
"Better Believe" (2021)	"Tick Tock" (2021)	"Way 2 Sexy" (2021)

Music video
- "Tick Tock" on YouTube

"Tick Tock" is a song by American rapper Young Thug, released as a single on August 20, 2021. The song was produced by Dr. Luke and Rocco Did It Again!, who both wrote the song with him. It serves as his first solo single of 2021 and was intended to be the lead single from his second studio album Punk, but was not part of the final track list.

== Background and composition ==
Young Thug first previewed the song on July 24, 2021, during his performance at Rolling Loud. Three days later, he performed at an NPR Tiny Desk concert, in which he performed the song. The song contains "big drums, big bass, and bright, buoyant synth stabs", and Thug is seen peeling off plenty of sharp, often funny bars in a characteristically dexterous vocal performance: "He'll give up his kidney/But Saint Laurent still tryna cease-and-desist it, woo"; "I always trust my guts/I've just been shitting with no flush"; "Gucci stroller for the kids, so what?"

== Critical reception ==
Tom Breihan of Stereogum described the song as "flat, uninspired Atlanta trap — the kind of track that Thug could probably make in his sleep and maybe already has", adding that "it's not terrible or anything; Thug's got that endearing squeak in his voice, and he makes effortless melodic left turns. But there's nothing much notable about the song other than a hook that feels like a ploy to go viral on a certain social-media platform".

== Music video ==
A music video was released ten hours after the song on August 20, 2021. It sees Young Thug in an office with a bunch of supermodels and shows expensive cars.

== Credits and personnel ==
Credits adapted from Tidal.

- Young Thug – vocals, songwriting
- Dr. Luke – production, songwriting
- Rocco Did It Again! – production, songwriting
- A. 'Bainz' Bains – mixing, recording
- Aresh Banaji – mixing assistant
- Joe LaPorta – mastering
- Jonathan Bailey – engineering assistant
- Geoff Ogunlesi – A&R direction

== Charts ==
Chart performance for "Tick Tock"
Chart (2021)	Peak position
Global 200 (Billboard)	196
New Zealand Hot Singles (RMNZ)	34
US Billboard Hot 100	96
US Hot R&B/Hip-Hop Songs (Billboard)	37
US Rhythmic (Billboard)	27
