= Slut Pop Miami =

EP by Kim Petras
- Released: 14 February 2024
- Genre: Dance-pop
- Length: 23:59
- Labels: Amigo; Republic
- Producer: Dr. Luke

Kim Petras chronology
Problématique (2023)	Slut Pop Miami (2024)	Detour (2026)

Slut Pop Miami is the fourth extended play by German singer Kim Petras. It was released on 14 February 2024 through Amigo and Republic Records, and was produced by Dr. Luke. It serves as a sequel to her 2022 EP Slut Pop.

Slut Pop Miami received mixed reviews; while some praised its bold, outrageous themes and the sex-positive direction of the project, others criticized its repetitive nature and felt it lacked the original EP's spark.

== Background and release ==
Petras released Slut Pop on 11 February 2022, a dance-pop EP with overtly sex-positive lyricism. Petras began to tease Miami-inspired visuals reminiscent of the 2002 video game Grand Theft Auto: Vice City and announced the title of the sequel project on 7 February 2024.

== Composition ==
The EP has twelve tracks. Billboard has called the collection a "sex positive lust bomb". Bernardo Sim of Out wrote, "This project also provides campy commentary on the extremely hyper-sexualized state of LGBTQ+ culture, for all the good and bad parts that exist within it." In an interview with American actress Carmen Electra, Petras shared that house music influenced the EP, and shared that the lyrics were inspired by her experiences on vacation in Miami.

== Reception ==
Clash rated the EP 7 out of 10, with Robin Murray writing "Slut Pop Miami grinds down on its theme, refusing to avoid your awkward glances. Blistering neon-tinted pop with some aspects of hip-hop swagger to the production, the track titles alone could make you blush." Vulture gave the EP a negative review that criticized the decision of Petras to make a sequel to the original Slut Pop, with Reanna Cruz writing "Slut Pop Miami replaces that rapturous lust [of Slut Pop] for mechanical routine."

== Track listing ==
All tracks are produced by Dr. Luke. All tracks are written by Aaron Joseph, Kim Petras, Rocco Valdes, Ryan Ogren, and Lukasz Gottwald unless otherwise specified.

Slut Pop Miami track listing
No.	Title	Writer(s)	Length
1.	"Slut Pop Reprise"		1:35
2.	"Gag on It"	Aaron Jennings; Joseph; Petras; Valdes; Ogren; Gottwald	1:39
3.	"Fuckin' This Fuckin' That"	Jennings; Joseph; Petras; Ogren; Gottwald	1:06
4.	"Banana Boat"		2:21
5.	"Get Fucked"		2:07
6.	"Rim Job"		2:40
7.	"Cockblocker"		2:28
8.	"Butt Slutt"		1:32
9.	"Head Head Honcho"		3:01
10.	"Cubana"	Jennings; Joseph; Petras; Ogren; Gottwald	1:41
11.	"Whale Cock"	Petras; Valdes; Ogren; Gottwald	1:50
12.	"Can We Fuck?"		1:53
Total length:			23:59

== Personnel ==
- Kim Petras - vocals
- Dr. Luke - programming, producer
- MixReady - mixing engineer
- Clint Gibbs - mixing engineer
- Tyler Sheppard - engineer
- Kalani Thompson - engineer
- Ashlee Gibbs - studio personnel
- Dale Becker - mastering engineer
- Katie Harvey - assistant mastering engineer
- Cody Critcheloe (SSION) - photographer, visual director

== Charts ==
Chart performance for Slut Pop: Miami
Chart (2024)	Peak position
US Top Dance Albums (Billboard)	14
