= Atomic Tangerine =

American rock band

- Genres: Rock
- Members: Joshua Snyder; Aton Ben-Horin; Jacob Morton; Mike Rollo
- Website: www.atomictangerinemusic.com

Atomic Tangerine is an American rock band. The band's lineup consists of vocalist/rhythm guitarist Joshua Snyder, lead guitarist Aton Ben-Horin, bassist Jacob Morton, and drummer Mike Rollo.

Josh co-founded the band in 1995 along with Aton, his close childhood friend of 12 years. Atomic wrote/recorded music and toured the country performing to countless sold-out crowds. Atomic disbanded in 2007 to pursue other musical endeavors – however, all the band-mates remain close and continue to work together on various projects.

Atomic shared the stage with bands like Jimmy Eat World, Nine Inch Nails, Rob Zombie, Velvet Revolver, 3 Doors Down, Alter Bridge, Shinedown, Flyleaf, Coheed & Cambria, Avenged Sevenfold, Simple Plan, Buckcherry, Better Than Ezra, Jimmy's Chicken Shack, Blues Traveler, Gin Blossoms, Fastball, Andrew W.K., Cypress Hill, Less Than Jake, Guster, Black Eyed Peas, and many more.

In 2003, Atomic Tangerine won the national Hard Rock/HBO/Rolling Stones Battle of the Bands contest, beating out thousands of bands from all over the country. They were flown to Times Square in NYC to perform before The Rolling Stones at their HBO Madison Square Gardens live show/filming.

== Discography ==
- Atomic Tangerine (1998)
- Gravity/The Chase (2004)
- Bitch for Society (2005)
- Creatures of Habit (2005)
