= Blue Moon (EP) =

EP by Coi Leray
- Released: August 30, 2023
- Genre: Hip hop
- Length: 10:22
- Label: Uptown; Republic; UMG
- Producer: Ayoroc; Money Jesus; Lil Rambo; Rocketboy; Tommy "TBHITS" Brown; Taylor Hill; DJ On The Beat; Mathking64

Coi Leray chronology
Coi (2023)	Blue Moon (2023)	Lemon Cars (2024)

Blue Moon is the fourth extended play (EP) by American singer-songwriter and rapper Coi Leray. It was released on August 30, 2023 through Uptown Records, a division of Republic Records and UMG.

== Track listing ==
Blue Moon track listing
No.	Title	Writer(s)	Producer(s)	Length
1.	"Liquor and Weed"	Coi Leray	Ayoroc; Money Jesus	2:37
2.	"Wicked Butterflies"	Coi Leray; German Valdés	Lil Rambo; Ayoroc	2:32
3.	"Isabel Marant"	Coi Leray	Rocketboy; Mathking64	1:37
4.	"Still Dreaming"	Coi Leray; Leonard "Skeez" Lowman; Alexander "Big A" Prado; Courtlin Jabrae	Tommy "TBHITS" Brown; Taylor Hill	2:29
5.	"3,2,1 (Trust)"	Coi Leray	DJ On The Beat	1:46
Total length:				10:22
