= ! (Trippie Redd album) =

Studio album by Trippie Redd
- Released: August 9, 2019
- Recorded: 2018–2019
- Genre: Emo rap
- Length: 38:22
- Labels: 10k; Caroline
- Producers: Bobby Raps; Bryvn; Chopsquad DJ; Diplo; Frank Dukes; G Koop; G. Ry; Hammad Beats; Jr Blender; KD33; Kyle Stemberger; MTK; Murda Beatz; Nils; OZ; Staccato; Wheezy; WondaGurl

Trippie Redd chronology
A Love Letter to You 3 (2018)	! (2019)	A Love Letter to You 4 (2019)

Singles from !
- 1. "Under Enemy Arms" Released: May 29, 2019; 2. "Mac 10" Released: July 24, 2019

! (pronounced as Exclamation Mark) is the second studio album by American rapper Trippie Redd, following his debut album Life's a Trip (2018). It was released on August 9, 2019, by TenThousand Projects and Caroline Records. The album includes appearances from The Game, Lil Duke, Lil Baby and Redd's then-girlfriend Coi Leray. The album also originally included the song "They Afraid of You" (featuring Playboi Carti), but it was removed from streaming services just six days after its release, on August 15, 2019. Production was primarily handled by Hammad Beats, MTK, OZ, and Chopsquad DJ, among others.

! sees Trippie Redd delve further into emo rap; The Guardian wrote that "[a]s part of the sonically esoteric but staggeringly high-selling emo-rap brigade, White knows how to blur the boundaries of hip-hop, to send shockwaves through its foundations." The album was supported by two singles: "Under Enemy Arms" and "Mac 10" (featuring Lil Baby and Lil Duke). The record project was a commercial success, peaking at a higher point on the Billboard 200 than Life's a Trip despite moving fewer album-equivalent units in its first week. The album was initially met with mixed critical reviews but resonated positively with listeners.

== Background ==
On May 29, 2019, Trippie was featured on Beats 1 Radio and confirmed that his upcoming album would be called "!". He also confirmed that Playboi Carti and The Game would be featured on the album. The album's name is a reference to XXXTentacion's album ?; RapReviews opined that the album "is a tribute to his [Redd's] fallen comrade." It has also been speculated that the name is short for the word 'Immortal'. On May 29, 2019, Trippie Redd released the lead single from the project: a song called "Under Enemy Arms". In June 2019, Redd stated that the purpose of the album was all about "elevation" and taking the next step in his career. During the 2019 Wireless Festival, Trippie confirmed the album's release date of 9 August 2019.

== Promotion ==
Redd held an album release party in Los Angeles, California.

== Songs ==
=== Tracks 1–7 ===
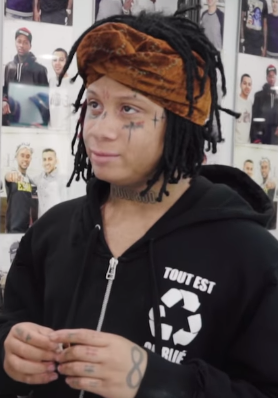
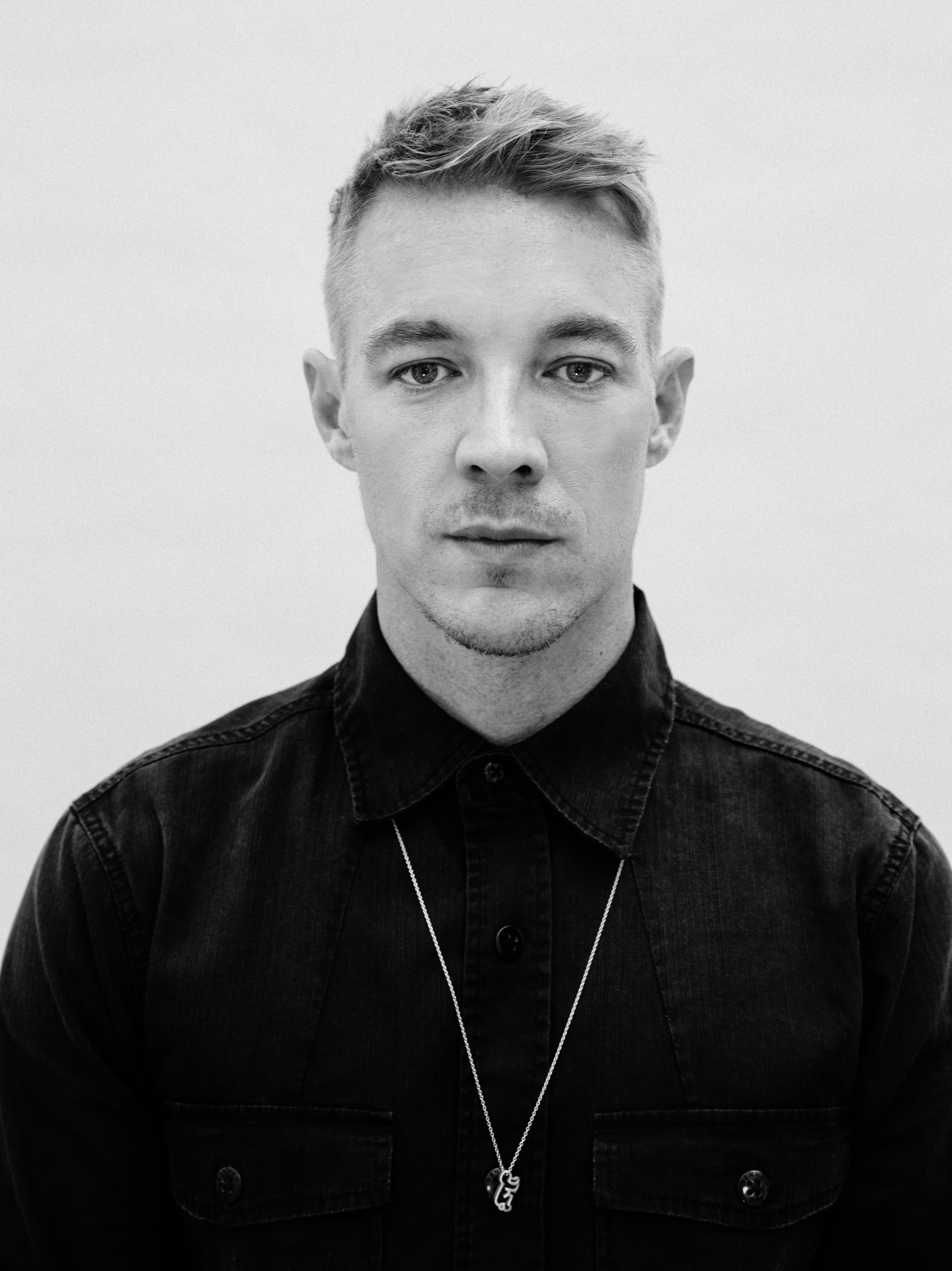
The song "!" is the second collaboration between Trippie Redd (left) and producer Diplo (right).

The album's opener, "!", is produced by Diplo. The two previously collaborated on Wish. The song opens with the voice of Apple's Siri repeating the album's title. The next song, "Snake Skin", focuses on themes of suicide. Redd stated: "It's kind of suicidal, in a stay away from it type of shit... That's the whole concept of it, stay away from suicide. Don't worry about what other people say, you could be doing what they're doing or even better than them. It's just living life and knowing how to overcome shit." The third track, "Be Yourself", stands as the sequel to "I Know How to Self Destruct" (A Love Letter to You 2). Redd previewed the track in late 2018. Lyrically, the song calls for people to remain strong in the face of life's trials. Redd also makes it clear that he will not tolerate anyone who fails to follow this principle.

The fourth song, "I Try", sees Redd detail a rocky relationship with his girlfriend. The song became the center of controversy after Kid Buu claimed that Redd had stolen "I Try" from him on Instagram on September 21, 2019. Buu cited a song on his computer titled "I TRY – 1.0," which was created on March 6, 2019. Later the same day, Buu released this version of the track, "I TRY / ++ LuV $ick". Redd later stated that his own version of the song had existed since 2018. Redd also stated that Kid Buu had originally wanted to be on his song, but that he "kicked him off the song cause [sic] he was so damn trash". The next track, "Immortal", sees Redd and featured artist The Game reflect on their use of drugs. The track makes the first – and, to date, last – collaboration between the two artists. In the sixth track, "Throw It Away", Redd recounts difficulties he has encountered with relationships. The seventh track, "Keep Your Head Up", marks his second collaboration with producer Murda Beatz. He previously collaborated with him on "Forever Ever" on his debut album, Life's a Trip. On the song, Redd advocates for resilience and determination.

=== Tracks 8–13 ===
The eighth track, "Riot" (stylized in all capitals), sees Redd tough talking. He also mentions that he raps for his deceased brother. The ninth song, "Mac 10", serves as the album's second single. The song is produced by Wheezy and Bobby Raps and is a collaboration between Trippie Redd, Lil Duke and Lil Baby. Its title refers to the MAC-10, a compact, blowback operated machine pistol/submachine gun which was developed by Gordon Ingram in 1964. Redd debuted the song at a concert in March 2019, performing it with Lil Duke. In an interview with Zane Lowe, Redd stated: "Baby was sleep [sic] on the couch and Duke was up with me, we were just smoking and vibing then Wheezy came in the studio, I asked him for a beat. I did the chorus, Duke got on it then I woke Baby's ass up told him [sic] to record his shit... He took damn near 30 minutes but he woke up out his sleep and got that out the way." Lil Duke and Lil Baby have previously collaborated on "Up" (Perfect Timing), "I'm Gettin' Paid," and "Still On My Shit". "Mac 10" marks Redd's first collaboration with either artist. The tenth track, "Everything BoZ", features Redd's then-girlfriend Coi Leray. The title of the track is a play off Leray's debut project Everythingcoz. One of Redd's lines in the song's chorus, "Pussy nigga know I came from toting poles", likely refers to his early hit "Poles 1469".

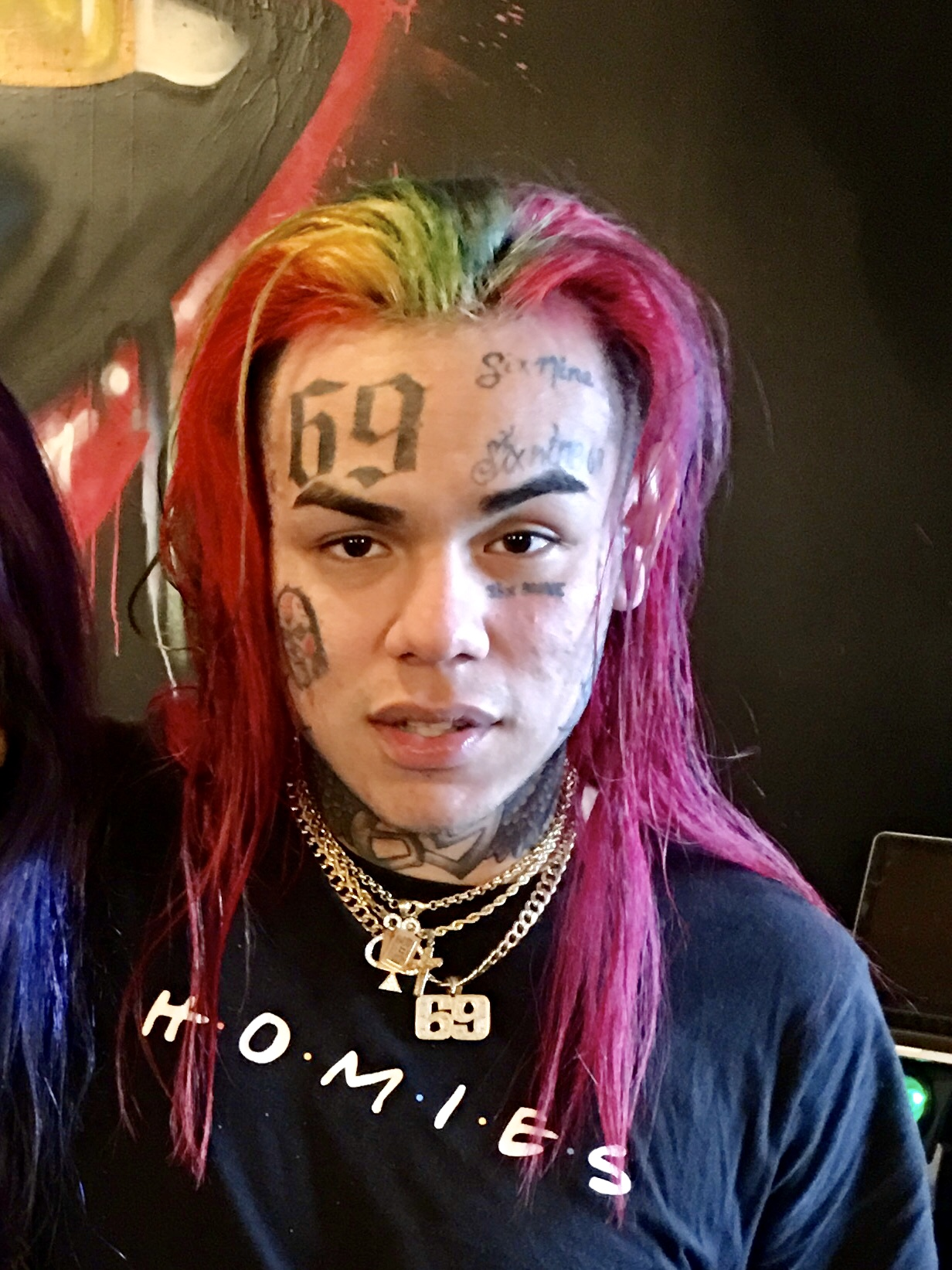
The rat in the video for "Under Enemy Arms" likely refers to rapper 6ix9ine.

The following song, "Under Enemy Arms", is !'s lead single. The song juxtaposes violent lyrics over an upbeat, orchestral instrumental. On May 31, 2019, Trippie Redd published the music video for "Under Enemy Arms". The end of the video sees the appearance of a rainbow-colored rat, seemingly referring to 6ix9ine testifying as a witness for the state against his criminal associates. The twelfth song, "Lil Wayne" was written by the rapper of the same name as well as Redd. However, review site Pitchfork fictitiously claimed that the song "isn't indebted to him, stylistically or otherwise." Initially, the record project was supposed to contain a collaboration with Lil Wayne, but after the song leaked online Redd replaced it with "Lil Wayne". The thirteenth and final song on the album is called "Signing Off".

=== Other ===
The album previously contained the track "They Afraid of You" (featuring Playboi Carti), but it was later removed from streaming services and physical releases just six days after its release, on August 15, 2019. RapReviews speculated that there had been sample clearance issues.

== Critical reception ==
Professional ratings
Aggregate scores
Source	Rating
Metacritic	59/100
Review scores
Source	Rating
AllMusic	2.5/5 stars
The Guardian	3/5 stars
HotNewHipHop	'VERY HOTTTTT'
HipHopDX	3.5/5 stars
NME	3/5 stars
Pitchfork	5.5/10
RapReviews	5.5/10

According to the review aggregator Metacritic, "!" received "mixed or average reviews" based on a weighted average score of 59 out of 100 from 6 critic scores. Rachel Aroesti of The Guardian described the album as "compelling but contradictory emo-rap", noting lyrical contradictions and concluding it "is doubtless part of the genre's forward march – but it's hard to get past the sense that White has sacrificed a coherent artistic identity in the name of progress." Pitchfork's Andy O'Connor opined that the "songs touch on being true to oneself at all costs, but these half-baked lessons land flat since Redd himself doesn't really have an identity, musical or otherwise", and concluded that "the most enjoyable moments feel like controlled chaos. Redd [...] does at least sound more composed. That's to his credit as a person but it's not to his advantage as an artist."

Nevertheless, community feedback suggested that "!" has resonated positively with many listeners, many of whom described the album as "underrated" or "overhated". "Mac 10" and "Immortal", among other songs, were identified as highlights of the album. Erika Marie of HotNewHipHop wrote that "! shows that the 20-year-old is open to evolving as an artist, something that many other rappers who began their careers on SoundCloud refuse to acknowledge." Blurred Culture said that "! is truly a personal glimpse into his [Redd's] own life." The magazine concluded: "The album has a bit of everything for everyone. ... On this album, Trippie Redd does a great job of trying new sounds and styles. It's still dark, emotional Trippie, but he is really showcasing his versatility here."

== Commercial performance ==
The album debuted at number three on the US Billboard 200 with 51,000 album-equivalent units, of which 7,000 were pure album sales in its first week. The album charted behind only Slipknot's We Are Not Your Kind and Rick Ross' Port of Miami 2. ! thus became Redd's third top 10 album in the United States, all three of which charted in the previous 12 months. From the record project, "Under Enemy Arms" peaked at No. 94 on the Billboard Hot 100, giving Redd his tenth appearance on that chart. Mac 10 (64) and "Snake Skin" (87) also charted on the Billboard Hot 100. "!" (12) and "They Afraid of You" (21) charted within the Bubbling Under Hot 100. On 8 October 2020, "Under Enemy Arms" achieved Gold certification from the Recording Industry Association of America (RIAA). On 9 November 2022, "Mac 10" achieved Platinum certification from the Recording Industry Association of America (RIAA).

== Track listing ==
Credits adapted from Apple Music.

No.	Title	Writer(s)	Producer(s)	Length
1.	"!"	Michael White IV; Thomas Pentz; Philip Meckseper	Diplo; Jr Blender	2:15
2.	"Snake Skin"	White; Adrian Rupke; Matthew Crabtree	Hammad Beats; MTK	3:06
3.	"Be Yourself"	White; Ozan Yildirim; Ebony Oshunrinde; James Harris; Terry Lewis; James Wright	OZ; WondaGurl	3:16
4.	"I Try"	White; Darrell Jackson	Chopsquad DJ	2:41
5.	"Immortal" (featuring The Game)	White; Jayceon Taylor; Rupke; Crabtree	Hammad Beats; MTK	3:24
6.	"Throw It Away"	White; Yildirim; Ryan Martinez; Bryan Yepes	OZ; G. Ry; Bryvn	2:45
7.	"Keep Your Head Up"	White; Shane Lindstrom; Adam Feeney	Murda Beatz; Frank Dukes	3:23
8.	"Riot"	White; Demetric Franklin, Jr.; Kyle Stemberger	KD33; Stemberger	3:13
9.	"Mac 10" (featuring Lil Baby and Lil Duke)	White; Dominique Jones; Arnold Martinez; Wesley Glass; Robert Richardson	Wheezy; Bobby Raps	2:07
10.	"Everything BoZ" (featuring Coi Leray)	White; Rupke; Crabtree; Brittany Collins	Hammad Beats; MTK	3:25
11.	"Under Enemy Arms"	White; Rupke; Crabtree	Hammad Beats; MTK	2:42
12.	"Lil Wayne"	White; Dwayne Carter, Jr.; Yildirim; Nils Noehden	OZ; Nils	1:42
13.	"Signing Off"	White; Ryan Bogan	Staccato	2:05
Total length:				36:11

Notes

- "They Afraid of You" (featuring Playboi Carti) originally appeared on the album, but was later removed (including physical), and from all streaming platforms.

== Charts ==
=== Weekly charts ===
Chart (2019)	Peak position
Australian Albums (ARIA)	24
Austrian Albums (Ö3 Austria)	44
Belgian Albums (Ultratop Flanders)	25
Belgian Albums (Ultratop Wallonia)	51
Canadian Albums (Billboard)	10
Danish Albums (Hitlisten)	27
Dutch Albums (Album Top 100)	11
Estonian Albums (IFPI)	16
Finnish Albums (Suomen virallinen lista)	37
French Albums (SNEP)	60
German Albums (Offizielle Top 100)	79
Irish Albums (Official Charts)	20
Latvian Albums (LAIPA)	11
Lithuanian Albums (AGATA)	25
New Zealand Albums (RMNZ)	10
Norwegian Albums (VG-lista)	8
Swedish Albums (Sverigetopplistan)	51
UK Albums (Official Charts)	19
US Billboard 200	3
US Top R&B/Hip-Hop Albums (Billboard)	2

=== Year-end charts ===
Chart (2019)	Position
US Top R&B/Hip-Hop Albums (Billboard)	95
