= Self Love (song) =

2023 song by Metro Boomin and Coi Leray

Song by Metro Boomin and Coi Leray

from the album Spider-Man: Across the Spider-Verse (Soundtrack from and Inspired by the Motion Picture)
- Released: June 2, 2023
- Recorded: 2021
- Genre: R&B; Alternative hip hop
- Length: 3:10
- Label: Boominati; Republic
- Songwriters: Leland Wayne; Brittany Collins; Brittany Hazzard; Andre Proctor; Mejdi Rhars; Stephen Feigenbaum
- Producers: Metro Boomin; Dre Moon; Prince85

"Self Love" is a song by American record producer Metro Boomin and American rapper and singer Coi Leray. It was released through Boominati Worldwide and Republic Records as the ninth track from Metro's first soundtrack album, which was for the film Spider-Man: Across the Spider-Verse, on June 2, 2023. Produced by Metro himself, Dre Moon, and Prince85, and additionally produced by Johan Lenox, the four wrote it with Coi Leray and Starrah.

== Credits and personnel ==
Credits are adapted from the liner notes.

Musicians

- Leland Wayne – producer, programming, songwriter
- Coi Collins – vocals, songwriter
- Johan Lenox – programming, strings, background vocals, songwriter, additional producer
- Andre Proctor – songwriter, producer, songwriter
- Natalie Spehar – cello
- Nick Kennerly – violin
- Yasmmen Al-Mazeedi – violin
- Prince85 – programming, producer, songwriter
- Mejdi Rrahs – songwriter
- Brittany Hazzard – songwriter

Technical

- Ethan Stevens – mixing engineer
- Joe LaPorta – mastering engineer
- Germán Valdés – recording engineer

== Charts ==
Chart performance for "Self Love"
| Chart (2023) | Peak position |
|---|---|
| Australia (ARIA) | 41 |
| Australia Hip Hop/R&B (ARIA) | 20 |
| Canada Hot 100 (Billboard) | 40 |
| Global 200 (Billboard) | 58 |
| Malaysia (Billboard) | 22 |
| Malaysia International (RIM) | 20 |
| New Zealand (Recorded Music NZ) | 29 |
| Singapore (RIAS) | 17 |
| US Billboard Hot 100 | 54 |
| US Hot R&B/Hip-Hop Songs (Billboard) | 17 |

== Certifications ==
Certifications for "Self Love"
| Region | Certification | Certified units/sales |
|---|---|---|
| Australia (ARIA) | Gold | 35,000^{‡} |
| Brazil (Pro-Música Brasil) | Gold | 20,000^{‡} |
| New Zealand (RMNZ) | Gold | 15,000^{‡} |
^{‡} Sales+streaming figures based on certification alone.
