= Trendsetter (Coi Leray album) =

Studio album by Coi Leray
- Released: April 8, 2022
- Genres: Pop; hip-hop
- Length: 50:23
- Labels: Uptown; Republic; 1801
- Producers: Coi Leray; AyoRoc; Bankroll Got It; Bigwhite Beatz; Bizness Boi; BNYX; Chambers; Chief Keef; Die Next Weekend; Diego Ave; DJ Swish; DP Beats; Dr. Luke; Fortune; HNNBL; Holy; Jaasu; Kid Hazel; Lil Aaron; LJay Currie; Maaly Raw; Mike Crook; Mustard; Mvcancik; Needlz; Nic Nac; Okaykhan; Parker Molen; Peter Gundry; Pitt tha Kid; Reecebeats; Rocco Did It Again!; Ryan Ogren; SephGotTheWaves; Stichface; Tash; UY Scuti; Yung Swisher

Coi Leray chronology
Now or Never (2020)	Trendsetter (2022)	Coi (2023)

Singles from Trendsetter
- 1. "No More Parties (Remix)" Released: February 19, 2021; 2. "Big Purr (Prrdd)" Released: March 26, 2021; 3. "Twinnem" Released: September 20, 2021; 4. "Anxiety" Released: January 28, 2022; 5. "Blick Blick" Released: March 18, 2022

Trendsetter is the debut studio album by American singer Coi Leray. It was released through Uptown Records, Republic Records and 1801 on April 8, 2022. The album contains guest appearances from Nicki Minaj, Yung Bleu, Fivio Foreign, Young M.A, G Herbo, H.E.R., Nav, Lil Durk, Wallo267, King Gillie, Polo G, Lil Tecca, A Boogie wit da Hoodie, and Pooh Shiesty. Production was handled by Leray herself, Dr. Luke, Rocco Did It Again!, Ryan Ogren, Needlz, Maaly Raw, Chief Keef, Mustard, and Nic Nac, among others. Trendsetter is a hip-hop and pop album.

== Background ==
In June 2021, Leray was interviewed by the Two Bees TV at the 2021 BET Hip Hop Awards, in which she said that Trendsetter would be released in September of the same year and revealed some of the artists who would contribute to the album, including H.E.R., A Boogie wit da Hoodie, and Nav. On October 1, 2021, she stated that she was ready to release an album, but Republic Records, the record label that she is signed to did not think so and she was following their plan. Leray announced that she had completed the album in December 2021.

On April 8, 2022, the same day that Trendsetter was released, Leray was interviewed by Nick and Eddie of Apple Music, in which she expressed her gratitude for artists appearing on the album by describing it as "a dream come true" and furtherly explaining:

I would feel very, very weird if nobody wanted to work with me. At this point, it’s like, "Damn, what am I doing this for if nobody with my music and nobody wants to work at that?" I don't know, I grew up listening to all those people on my featured list, and to be able to have an actual collab with them is a dream come true still to this day, don't care how big, even if I'm bigger than the artists on there, it's a dream come true to always work with every single last person on my project.

== Release and promotion ==
On March 28, 2022, Leray announced the release date of the album and shared its cover art, deeming the album as "one of the biggest female artist albums in the world". Three days later, she revealed the list of artists that would appear on the album. She revealed the tracklist on April 4, 2022.

== Critical reception ==
professional ratings".
Aggregate scores
Source	Rating
Metacritic	60/100
Review scores
Source	Rating
AllMusic	2/5 stars
HipHopDX	3.3/5
HotNewHipHop	69%
Pitchfork	6.1/10
Rolling Stone	3.5/5 stars

Trendsetter was met with mixed reviews from music critics. At Metacritic, which assigns a normalized rating out of 100 to reviews from mainstream publications, the album received an average score of 60 based on four reviews, which indicates "mixed or average reviews".

AllMusic described the album as "more of a trend follower than anything", adding that "loose ideas that could conceivably be cleaned up for a Doja Cat album, the main issue is that there's a lack of originality and unique spirit to set these tracks apart from any number of similar-sounding songs by other more capable artists" and "in addition to often sleepy and forgettable production, Leray's flow leaves much to be desired", and even the guest artists do not make the album exciting. HipHopDX music critic Anthony Malone stated that "the faults in Trendsetter come mostly because she relies on the star power brought by her guests but negates her ability to identify herself within the music" and that "she likely has a future in the industry, but to stand on her own, she will need to start setting the trends, rather than following them". Joshua Robinson of HotNewHipHop opined that "thanks to its producers and featured artists, Coi Leray's album is filled with entertaining performances from some of the most well-known rappers in the music industry", adding that "even when Coi sidesteps the shadows of her high-profile contributors to deliver a respectable amount of solo cuts, Trendsetter remains an album that's hard to truly despise" and "its vast array of sounds to its cast of supporting contributors, Trendsetter is so deeply embedded in contemporary Hip-Hop that listeners much decide whether they hate Coi Leray or the current state of rap". Pitchfork music critic Dylan Green "as a whole, Trendsetter is too wide-ranging and unfocused to scan as the proper debut she aspires for it to be", "but when she does lock in, her mission couldn’t be clearer". Mosi Reeves of Rolling Stone felt that "despite being a splashy, major label-backed coming-out party for Leray, Trendsetter can sound provocatively weird" and "her lyrics can come off awkward and forced".

=== Singles ===
The lead single of the album, the remix of Leray's 2021 single, "No More Parties", features American rapper Lil Durk and was released on February 19, 2021. The second single, "Big Purr (Prrdd)", which features American rapper Pooh Shiesty, was released on March 26, 2021. The third single, "Twinnem", was released on September 20, 2021 and became viral on TikTok as soon as it came out. The fourth single, "Anxiety", was released on January 28, 2022. The fifth and final single, "Blick Blick", a collaboration with Trinidadian-American rapper Nicki Minaj, was released on March 18, 2022.

== Track listing ==
Trendsetter track listing
No.	Title	Writer(s)	Producer(s)	Length
1.	"Hollywood Dreams"	Coi Collins; Diego Avendano; Joel Banks; Taylor Banks; Matthew Banks; Martin Pitt; Philipp Riebenstahl; Germán Valdés	Diego Ave; Bankroll Got It; Pitt Tha Kid; Yung Swisher; AyoRoc	2:26
2.	"Blick Blick" (with Nicki Minaj)	Collins; Onika Maraj; Lukasz Gottwald; Rocco Valdes; Ryan Ogren; Mike Crook; Randall Hammers; Asia Smith	Dr. Luke; Rocco Did It Again!; Ogren; Crook	2:58
3.	"Aye Yai Yai" (with Yung Bleu)	Collins; Jeremy Biddle; Hector Mendel, Jr.; Teldrick Smith	HNNBL	3:03
4.	"Mountains" (with Fivio Foreign and Young M.A)	Collins; Maxie Ryles III; Katorah Marrero; Andrew Gradwohl, Jr.; Parker Molen; UY Scuti; Dylan Graham; Gabriel Lambirth	Bigwhite Beatz; Parker Molen; UY Scuti	2:48
5.	"Thief in the Night" (with G Herbo)	Collins; Herbert Wright III; Ahmar Bailey	Kid Hazel	2:46
6.	"Overthinking" (with H.E.R.)	Collins; Gabriella Wilson; Benjamin Saint Ford; Jaasu Mallory	BNYX; Jaasu	3:10
7.	"Clingy" (with Nav)	Collins; Navraj Goraya; Khari Cain; Jirou Williams	Needlz	3:26
8.	"Heartbreak Kid"	Collins; Avendano; J. Banks; T. Banks; G. Valdés	Diego Ave; Bankroll Got It	2:24
9.	"Twinnem"	Collins; Avendano; J. Banks; T. Banks; Samuel Ahana	Coi Leray; Diego Ave; Bankroll Got It; DJ Swish	1:57
10.	"No More Parties" (Remix) (featuring Lil Durk)	Collins; Durk Banks; Jamaal Henry; Tae-hyung Koo	Maaly Raw; Okaykhan	3:12
11.	"Be Me" (featuring Wallo267 and King Gillie)	Collins	Coi Leray	0:25
12.	"Lonely Fans"	Collins; Roman Sadygov	Die Next Weekend	1:36
13.	"Heart in a Coffin"	Collins; Tashim Zene; Jordan Fulton; Stichface	Tash; Holy; Stichface	2:31
14.	"Paranoid" (with Polo G)	Collins; Taurus Bartlett; Joseph Boyden; Zene	SephGotTheWaves; Tash	3:27
15.	"Box & Papers"	Collins; Avendano; J. Banks; T. Banks; LJay Currie; G. Valdés	Diego Ave; Bankroll Got It; Chambers; LJay Currie; AyoRoc	2:07
16.	"Mission Impossible" (with Lil Tecca)	Collins; Tyler-Justin Sharpe; Keith Cozart; Don Paschall	Chief Keef; DP Beats	2:13
17.	"Too Far"	Collins; G. Valdés; Andre Robertson; Rodney Montreal; Matthew Cancik	Bizness Boi; Fortune; Mvcancik	2:22
18.	"Mustard's Interlude" (with A Boogie wit da Hoodie)	Collins; Artist Dubose; Dijon McFarlane; Nicholas Balding; Maurice Ivory	Mustard; Nic Nac; Reecebeats	2:30
19.	"Anxiety"	Collins; Gottwald; R. Valdes; Ogren; Aaron Puckett; Alyssa Cantu	Dr. Luke; Rocco Did It Again!; Ryan OG; Lil Aaron	3:06
20.	"Big Purr (Prrdd)" (featuring Pooh Shiesty)	Collins; Lontrell Williams Jr.; Bailey; Peter Gundry	Kid Hazel; Gundry	1:56
Total length:				50:23

== Charts ==
Chart performance for Trendsetter
Chart (2022)	Peak position
US Billboard 200	89
US Top R&B/Hip-Hop Albums (Billboard)	49
