= Jameson Strachan =

Bahamian sprinter (born 1986)

Juan Lewis
Personal information
- Born: April 13, 1986 (age 40)
Medal record
Athletics
Representing Bahamas
CAC Junior Championships (U20)
Bronze medal – third place	2006 Port of Spain	4 × 400 m relay
CARIFTA Games Junior (U20)
Silver medal – second place	2006 Les Abymes	4 × 400 m relay

Jameson Strachan (born April 13, 1988) is a male track and field athlete from Nassau, Bahamas, who mainly competes in the 400 m. Strachan attended R.M Bailey High School in Nassau before competing for Dickinson State University and the University of Texas–Pan American.

He won a silver medal running a storming anchor leg on the 4 × 400 m relay team at the 2006 CARIFTA Games. It resulted in a Jr national record. Strachan was selected for the team in 2012 IAAF World Indoor Championships – Men's 4 × 400 metres relay but did not compete.

== Personal bests ==
Event	Time	Venue	Date
200 m	21.32	Orem, Utah	14 MAY 2011
400 m	46.60	San Marcos, Texas	30 APR 2011
4 × 400 Metres Relay	3:06.29	Gainesville, Florida	07 APR 2012
