= Big Purr (Prrdd) =

2021 single by Coi Leray with Pooh Shiesty

Single by Coi Leray with Pooh Shiesty

from the album Trendsetter
- Released: March 26, 2021
- Genre: Hip hop; trap
- Length: 1:56
- Label: Republic
- Songwriters: Coi Leray; Lontrell Williams; Ahmar Bailey; Peter Gundry
- Producers: Kid Hazel; Gundry

Coi Leray singles chronology
"Thieves in Atlanta" (2021)	"Big Purr (Prrdd)" (2021)	"I Like You" (2021)

Pooh Shiesty singles chronology
"Legendary" (2021)	"Big Purr (Prrdd)" (2021)	"Walk Down" (2021)

Music video
- "Big Purr (Prrdd)" on YouTube

"Big Purr (Prrdd)" (stylized as "BIG PURR (Prrdd)") is a song by American singer Coi Leray and American rapper Pooh Shiesty, released on March 26, 2021 by Republic Records, and serves as the second single from the former's debut album Trendsetter (2022). The song was produced by Kid Hazel and Peter Gundry. On April 26, 2021, Leray confirmed that there would be a remix of the song featuring hip hop duo City Girls.

== Background ==
Coi Leray first previewed "Big Purr" on February 19, 2021, in a TikTok video of her dancing and singing along to it. She later teased the song with a video on YouTube, before releasing it on March 26.

== Controversy ==
In March 2021, rapper Rolling Ray accused Coi Leray of stealing his phrase "purr" and turning it into a song. After they argued over who made the word "purr" popular, Leray denied the accusations responding, "First of all, I'm not big 'purr.' It's not 'purr.' I'm big 'prrr.' It's a difference. Stop playin' with me." Rolling Ray later released his own version of "Big Purr" as a diss track towards Leray, to which she threatened legal action. Ray also joined Leray's father, fellow rapper Benzino who is feuding with his daughter, on Instagram Live to taunt her. Rolling Ray expressed in an Instagram Live stream that "he was sick of gay artists having their ideas stolen, and he wanted to prevent the same situation from happening to 'Purr'".

== Music video ==
The music video was released on April 30, 2021, and directed by Reel Goats. It features Coi Leray wearing a leather ensemble while fighting Pooh Shiesty's crew in a warehouse. Shiesty counts his money and strokes his diamond until Leray faces him. The video then ends with a cliffhanger.

== Charts ==
Chart (2021)	Peak position
Global 200 (Billboard)	142
US Billboard Hot 100	69
US Hot R&B/Hip-Hop Songs (Billboard)	32

== Certifications ==
Region	Certification	Certified units/sales
United States (RIAA)	Gold	500,000^{‡}
^{‡} Sales+streaming figures based on certification alone.

== Release history ==
Release dates and formats for "Big Purr (Prrdd)"
Region	Date	Format	Label	Ref.
United States	June 8, 2021	Rhythmic contemporary	Republic	
