= No More Parties =

2021 single by Coi Leray

Single by Coi Leray

from the album Trendsetter
- Released: January 22, 2021
- Genre: Hip hop; R&B
- Length: 2:20
- Label: 1801; Republic
- Songwriters: Coi Collins; Jamaal Henry; Tae Hyung Koo
- Producers: Maaly Raw; Okaykhan

Coi Leray singles chronology
"G.I. Joe" (2020)	"No More Parties" (2021)	"Gimmy Licky" (2021)

Remix cover

Lil Durk singles chronology
"Leave Some Day (Remix)" (2021)	"No More Parties (Remix)" / "Go Crazy (Remix)" (2021)	"Jump" (2021)

Lyric video
- "No More Parties" on YouTube

Music video
- "No More Parties (Remix)" on YouTube

"No More Parties" is the major-label debut single by American rapper Coi Leray, released on January 22, 2021, through 1801 Records and Republic Records. Leray wrote the song alongside its producers Maaly Raw and Okaykhan. It is a mumble rap and R&B song with piano, "skittering" claps, and a subtle bass line, over which Leray rap-sings about elevating her life and career, while also venting about her father, Benzino.

A snippet of the song went viral on the video-sharing platform TikTok, and became her first charting song on any chart after peaking on the Billboard Hot 100 at number 26. A remix of the song, featuring fellow American rapper Lil Durk, was released on February 19, 2021, with the remix being included on Leray's debut studio album Trendsetter (2022).

== Background ==
Around one week before its release, Leray teased the song through a brief clip on the video-sharing platform TikTok. It quickly went viral, accruing over 42 million views in a week. The song marks a departure from her upbeat style.

== Composition and lyrics ==
The lyrics to "No More Parties" were inspired by Leray being invited to a friend's birthday party that she did not want to attend due to not having a gift and not wanting to "look broke". "No More Parties" is a mumble rap and R&B song in which Leray delivers "introspective" verses about issues in her life, including her family, friends and surroundings, and emphasizes in the chorus that she is leaving things and people behind that no longer benefit or "elevate" her. She admits to having trust issues and questions the intentions of those close to her.

The song's title is alluded to with the line, "I ain't even really tryna party, don't invite me to no party". She further takes aim at her father, rapper and reality star Benzino, with the line "My daddy let me down / But I promise you I won't let up / I wanna say fuck that man / But this shit won't make me better", a reference to her father's feud with American rapper Royce da 5'9". Royce had made disparaging remarks about Benzino's capabilities as her father, claiming that she has "daddy issues". Uproxx's Wongo Okon noted that the song features "parallel thoughts" to Kanye West's similarly titled song "No More Parties in LA". The song's production has been described as "smooth" and "somber"; it contains "heavenly" piano, "skittering" claps, a "unique down low" melody, with keys and a subtle, throwback bassline.

== Critical reception ==
British Vogue's Amel Mukhtar called "No More Parties" "bouncy, squeaky, [and] fun", writing that the chorus was "addictive". Respect's Ayana Rashed wrote that, on the song, Leray "confidently coasts through the verses before flexing her impressive vocal range and doubling back into hard-hitting bars". Noisey's Kristin Corry listed it among the songs that started the year off strong, and commended the lyrics for their optimistic outlook to the future. Aidan Kelly of RTÉ said the song "has all the makings of a very individual sound with something very different". Revolt's Regina Cho stated that Leray's vulnerability "rewarded her by making the track one of her most well-received".

== Lil Durk Remix ==
A day after the song's release, Leray announced in a tweet that she wanted Lil Durk to appear on the remix of the song, which he agreed to do. On the remix, Durk raps a verse about changing his inner circle, while showing love to his girlfriend India Royale. He also raps about "snitching", which HotNewHipHop's Erika Marie deemed to be about his foe, fellow American rapper 6ix9ine.

=== Music video ===
A music video for the song's remix, directed by the filmmaking trio Reel Goats, was released in March 2021. In the video, Leray walks through her mansion, cleaning up and forcing people out after a "wild" house party was thrown by her friends in her absence the night before.

== Other versions ==
Polo G, K Camp, F.S Rudy, Alrahim Wright III and Reese Youngn have all released remixes of the song.

== Chart performance ==
The song debuted at number 84 on the US Billboard Hot 100, becoming Leray's debut chart entry.

== Charts ==
=== Weekly charts ===
Weekly chart performance for "No More Parties"
Chart (2021)	Peak position
Global 200 (Billboard)	70
UK Singles (Official Charts)	85
US Billboard Hot 100	26
US Hot R&B/Hip-Hop Songs (Billboard)	15
US Rhythmic Airplay (Billboard)	11

=== Year-end charts ===
Year-end chart performance for "No More Parties"
Chart (2021)	Position
US Billboard Hot 100	79
US Hot R&B/Hip-Hop Songs (Billboard)	36

== Certifications ==
Certifications for "No More Parties"
Region	Certification	Certified units/sales
United States (RIAA)	2× Platinum	2,000,000^{‡}
^{‡} Sales+streaming figures based on certification alone.

== Release history ==
Release history and formats for "No More Parties"
Region	Date	Format	Label	Version	Ref.
Various	January 22, 2021	Digital download; streaming	1801; Republic	Standard	
Various	February 19, 2021	Digital download; streaming	1801; Republic	Remix	
United States	February 23, 2021	Rhythmic contemporary radio	1801; Republic	Standard	
