= Coi (album) =

Studio album by Coi Leray
- Released: June 23, 2023
- Studios: Chalice (Los Angeles); Criteria (Miami); Trendsetter (Los Angeles); Encore (Burbank); Paramount (Hollywood); Johnny's Pool House (Los Angeles); Champagne Therapy (Los Angeles); Underworld (London); Slime Universe (Atlanta)
- Length: 37:55
- Labels: Uptown; Republic
- Producers: Tommy Brown; Cubeatz; Dinero; Feli Ferraro; Johnny Goldstein; David Guetta; Taylor Hill; Akil King; Coi Leray; London on da Track; Rockin wit Slime

Coi Leray chronology
Trendsetter (2022)	Coi (2023)	Blue Moon (2023)

Singles from Coi
- 1. "Players" Released: November 30, 2022; 2. "Bops" Released: April 27, 2023; 3. "My Body" Released: April 28, 2023; 4. "Run It Up" Released: June 16, 2023; 5. "Make My Day" Released: June 23, 2023

Coi is the second studio album by American rapper and singer Coi Leray. It was released through Uptown and Republic Records on June 23, 2023. The album contains guest appearances from David Guetta, Saucy Santana, Giggs, Lola Brooke, the late James Brown, and Skillibeng. Production was handled by Leray and Guetta themselves, Johnny Goldstein, Akil King, Feli Ferraro, Tommy Brown, Taylor Hill, London on da Track, Cubeatz, Luis Bacqué, and Rockin wit Slime. The release of the album was preceded by four singles: "Players", "Bops", "My Body", "Run It Up" and "Make My Day". It serves as the follow-up to Leray's previous album, Trendsetter (2022).

== Background and promotion ==
In an interview with Eddie Francis of Apple Music 1 before she announced the album, Leray spoke about her intention with it:

I feel like a lot of the headlines kind of overshadow my true talent and what God really brought me here to do. So I just can't wait because this album's going to show that. … And also the second album's going to make people go back to Trendsetter and make them actually appreciate it for the music instead of the bullshit and the negative headlines and Coi Leray always being the topic. This album is all about me.

Leray announced the title of the album and revealed its cover art on May 19, 2023. She revealed the tracklist three days later.

== Singles ==
The lead single of the album, "Players", was released on November 30, 2022. The second and third singles, "Bops" and "My Body", were released on April 27 and 28, 2023, respectively. The fourth single, "Run It Up", was released on June 16, 2023. And the fifth and final single, "Make My Day" with David Guetta, was released on the same day as the album release.

== Critical reception ==
Professional ratings
Review scores
Source	Rating
AllMusic	3/5 stars
Pitchfork	4.5/10

Coi was met with lukewarm reviews from music critics. Heven Haile of Pitchfork felt that Coi "might as well be marketed as a covers album. Roughly 75% of the album relies on painfully obvious samples, copied and pasted in with little modification" and Leray "unimaginatively spins songs by men into #girlboss anthems". Haile also felt wrote that when Leray is "not deploying samples of popular songs, she's hopping on the wave of today's popular sounds" and concluded that "the only idea she brings to Coi" is introducing "the younger generation" to artists she samples.

== Track listing ==
Coi track listing
No.	Title	Writer(s)	Producer(s)	Length
1.	"Bitch Girl"	Coi Leray; Johnny Goldstein; A1 LaFlare; Akil King; Daryl Hall; John Oates	Goldstein	1:43
2.	"Bops"	Leray; Goldstein; Feli Ferraro; Germán Valdes; King	Goldstein	2:08
3.	"Make My Day" (with David Guetta)	Leray; Goldstein; Ferraro; David Guetta; King; Manuela Kamosi; Thomas de Quincey	Goldstein; Guetta	2:15
4.	"Players"	Leray; Goldstein; Ferraro; King; Edward Fletcher; Sylvia Robinson; Clifton Chase; Melvin Glover	Goldstein	2:18
5.	"My Body"	John Gluck, Jr.; Herbert Weiner; Wally Gold; Seymour Gottlieb; Leray; Goldstein; Ferraro; King	Goldstein; Leray; Ferraro; King	2:00
6.	"Get Loud"	Leray; Goldstein; Ferraro; Nick Lee; Tom Levesque; King; DJ Miles; Aton Ben-Horin	Goldstein; Lee^{[a]}; Levesque^{[a]}	1:50
7.	"Phuck It"	Leray; Goldstein; Ferraro; King; Miles; Thomas Bangalter; Guy-Manuel de Homem-Christo	Goldstein	1:58
8.	"Spend It" (featuring Saucy Santana)	Leray; Goldstein; Ferraro; King; Alexander Prado; Leonard Lowman; Rashad Spain	Goldstein	2:11
9.	"Don't Chat Me Up" (featuring Giggs)	Leray; Tommy Brown; Taylor Hill; Prado; Lowman; Alexis Boyd	Brown; Hill	2:41
10.	"On My Way"	Leray; Goldstein; Ferraro; King; Lowman; Prado	Goldstein	1:59
11.	"Run It Up"	Leray; Goldstein; Ferraro; A1 LaFlare; King	Goldstein	2:47
12.	"No Angels" (featuring Lola Brooke)	Leray; London Holmes; Shyniece Thomas; Samuel Coleman; Kevin Gomringer; Tim Gomringer; Darrell Perkins; Luis Bacqué	London on da Track; Cubeatz; Dinero; Bacqué^{[a]}	2:30
13.	"Man's World" (with James Brown)	Leray; Goldstein; Ferraro; Guetta; King; James Brown; Betty Jean Newsome	Goldstein; Guetta	3:15
14.	"Black Rose"	Leray; Goldstein; Ferraro; Guetta; King; Pierre-Luc Rioux; Atia Boggs	Goldstein; Guetta	2:15
15.	"Radioactive" (featuring Skillibeng)	Leray; Goldstein; Ferraro; King; Emwah Warmington; Everton Bonner; Sly Dunbar; John Taylor; Lloyd Willis	Goldstein	3:21
16.	"Come and Go"	Leray; Goldstein; King; Ferraro	Goldstein	2:44
Total length:				37:55

=== Notes ===
- ^{^[a]} indicates a co-producer
- "Bitch Girl" contains a sample of "Rich Girl", performed by Daryl Hall & John Oates.
- "Make My Day" contains a sample of "Pump Up the Jam", performed by Technotronic.
- "Players" contains samples of "The Message", performed by Grandmaster Flash and the Furious Five.
- "My Body" contains a sample of "It's My Party", performed by Lesley Gore.
- "Phuck It" contains samples from "Technologic", performed by Daft Punk.
- "Man's World" contains a sample of "It's a Man's Man's Man's World", written by James Brown and Betty Jean Newsome, with Brown posthumously credited as a featured artist.
- "Radioactive" contains a sample of "Murder She Wrote", performed by Chaka Demus & Pliers.

== Personnel ==
Musicians

- Coi Leray – vocals
- Johnny Goldstein – bass guitar, drums, keyboards, programming (tracks 1, 5)
- Tomer Biran – bass guitar, horn, saxophone (track 5)
- Shay Meiri – saxophone (track 5)
- Asaf Bitton – trombone (track 5)
- Arthur Krasnobaev – trumpet (track 5)
- Nick Lee – trombone (track 6)
- Tom Levesque – trumpet (track 6)
- Saucy Santana – vocals (track 8)
- Tommy Brown – additional vocals (track 9)
- Taylor Hill – additional vocals (track 9)
- Lola Brooke – vocals (track 12)
- James Brown – vocals (track 13)
- Pierre-Luc Rioux – guitar (track 14)
- Skillibeng – vocals (track 15)

Technical

- Joe LaPorta – mastering
- Patrizio "Teezio" Pigliapoco – mixing (tracks 1–12, 14, 16)
- Manny Marroquin – mixing (tracks 13, 15)
- Joe Grasso – immersive mixing
- Germán "Ayoroc" Valdes – recording (tracks 1–6, 8, 10, 11, 13–16), vocal editing (12)
- Johnny Goldstein – recording (tracks 5–8)
- Kahlil Vellani – recording (track 9)
- Taylor Hill – recording (track 9)
- Nick Bane – recording (track 12)
- Aresh Banaji – mixing assistance (tracks 1–12, 14, 16)
- Zach Pereya – mixing assistance (tracks 13, 15)
- Anthony Vilchis – mixing assistance (tracks 13, 15)
- Trey Station – mixing assistance (tracks 13, 15)
- Brandon Peralta – immersive mixing assistance
- Augusto Sanchez – immersive mixing assistance
- Ayanna Depas – immersive mixing assistance
- Giovanni "Blu" Rottier – immersive mixing assistance

Visuals

- Charlotte Rutherford – creative direction, photography
- Drew Gleason – creative direction
- Coi Leray – creative direction

== Charts ==
Chart performance for Coi
Chart (2023)	Peak position
US Billboard 200	102
US Top R&B/Hip-Hop Albums (Billboard)	45
