= Blick Blick =

2022 single by Coi Leray and Nicki Minaj

Single by Coi Leray and Nicki Minaj

from the album Trendsetter
- Released: March 18, 2022
- Genre: Hip hop; trap
- Length: 2:58
- Label: Republic; 1801
- Composers: Lukasz Gottwald; Rocco Valdes; Ryan Ogren; Mike Crook; Randall Hammers
- Lyricists: Coi Leray; Onika Maraj; Asia Smith
- Producers: Dr. Luke; Rocco Did It Again!; Ogren; Crook

Coi Leray singles chronology
"Anxiety" (2022)	"Blick Blick" (2022)	"Demon" (2022)

Nicki Minaj singles chronology
"Bussin" (2022)	"Blick Blick" (2022)	"We Go Up" (2022)

Music video
- "Blick Blick" on YouTube

"Blick Blick" is a song by American rappers Coi Leray and Nicki Minaj. It was released through Republic Records and 1801 on March 18, 2022 as the fifth and last single of Leray's debut studio album Trendsetter. The song was written by the artists alongside Randall Hammers, Asia Smith, and producers Dr. Luke, Rocco Did It Again!, Ryan Ogren, and Mike Crook. The single peaked at number 37 on the US Billboard Hot 100 and number 68 in Canada.

== Background and promotion ==
In February 2022, Leray's father, fellow American rapper Benzino, revealed that his daughter had a collaboration with Minaj, who then denied having worked with any artist recently. However, Benzino later apologized for announcing the joint effort. On March 14, 2022, Minaj revealed through a Q&A session on Twitter with her fans that she pulled her verse from "Blick Blick" due to Benzino previously announcing the team-up, but stated that she had a private conversation with Leray, in which she sympathized with her and decided to keep it on the song; the two artists announced the song the same day. On March 23, 2022, Minaj also praised Leray for her confidence on social media and Leray praised Minaj in return. Since then, it appears as if the two have cut ties and no longer associate with each other; as Minaj unfollowed Leray on social media in September 2022.

== Composition and lyrics ==
On "Blick Blick", Leray and Minaj confidently rap about their sexual activity and boast about their lavish lifestyles, while taking shots at their opponents. The "electric" song sees Leray using onomatopoeias in the chorus and the second half of her verse and Minaj name-drop DMX and Jeff Bezos, as well as give Leray a co-sign.

== Music video ==
The official music video for "Blick Blick" premiered on Leray's YouTube channel thirteen hours after the release of the song on March 18, 2022. Sporting 1990s-inspired outfits, Leray performs choreographed dances until Minaj joins her for what she had previously described as the "verse of the year" and the two artists then sport pink wigs and shoot at their opponents.

== Credits and personnel ==
- Coi Leray – vocals, songwriting
- Nicki Minaj – vocals, songwriting
- Dr. Luke – production, songwriting, programming
- Rocco Did It Again! – production, songwriting, programming
- Ryan Ogren – production, songwriting, programming
- Mike Crook – production, songwriting, programming
- Randall Hammers – songwriting
- Asia Smith – songwriting
- Clint Gibbs – production coordination
- Ashlee Gibbs – production coordination
- Serban Ghenea – mixing
- John Hanes – immersive mixing
- Kalani Thompson – engineering
- Tyler Sheppard – engineering
- Grant Horton – recording assistance
- Aubrey "Big Juice" Delaine – vocal mixing, vocal engineering

== Charts ==
Chart performance for "Blick Blick"
Chart (2022)	Peak position
Canada Hot 100 (Billboard)	68
Global 200 (Billboard)	66
New Zealand Hot Singles (RMNZ)	10
South Africa Streaming (TOSAC)	42
UK Singles Downloads (Official Charts)	71
US Billboard Hot 100	37
US Hot R&B/Hip-Hop Songs (Billboard)	10
US R&B/Hip-Hop Airplay (Billboard)	18
US Rhythmic Airplay (Billboard)	19

== Certifications ==
Certifications for "Blick Blick"
Region	Certification	Certified units/sales
United States (RIAA)	Gold	500,000^{‡}
^{‡} Sales+streaming figures based on certification alone.
