= Players (Coi Leray song) =

2022 single by Coi Leray

Single by Coi Leray

from the album Coi
- Released: November 30, 2022
- Genre: Hip hop; funk
- Length: 2:19
- Label: Uptown; Republic
- Songwriters: Coi Leray; Johnny Goldstein; Akil King; Feli Ferraro
- Producer: Goldstein

Coi Leray singles chronology
| "Fly Sh!t" (2022) | "Players" (2022) | "Wasted" (2022) |

"Players" is a song by American rapper and singer Coi Leray. It was released on November 30, 2022, through Republic Records and 1801 as the lead single from her second studio album, Coi (2023). Leray wrote the song with producer Johnny Goldstein, alongside WorldWideFresh, Feli Ferraro, and German (AyoRoc!) Valdes. It contains samples of American hip hop group Grandmaster Flash and the Furious Five's 1982 single, "The Message", from their debut studio album of the same name and an interpolation of Dr Dre's 2000 single "The Next Episode", from the second studio album, 2001. In March 2023, a remix of the song using the instrumental of Busta Rhymes' 1997 song "Put Your Hands Where My Eyes Could See" and containing a guest verse by him was released.

== Background ==
In early November 2022, Leray teased a snippet of the song on the video-sharing app TikTok and described it as a song that was dedicated to women being "players". The song samples "The Message" by Grandmaster Flash and the Furious Five, in which she raps: "What you know about living on top / Penthouse suites looking down on the opps / Took him for a test drive / Left him on the lot / Time is money / So I spent it on a watch". About one week later, Leray met up with Grandmaster Flash from the hip hop group for dinner, in which he gifted her a custom-made hoodie with the phrase "Girls Are Players Too" on it to support the release of the song. In late December 2022, she revealed that she freestyle rapped the song in one take.

== Credits and personnel ==
- Coi Leray – vocals, songwriting
- Johnny Goldstein – production, songwriting
- Akil King – songwriting
- Feli Ferraro – songwriting
- German (AyoRoc) Valdes – recording, songwriting
- Edward G. Fletcher, Melvin Glover, Clifton Nathaniel Chase, Sylvia Robinson – "The Message" sample authors
- Patrizio "Teezio" Pigliapoco – mixing
- Ignacio Portales – mixing assistance
- Joe LaPorta – mastering

== Charts ==
=== Weekly charts ===
2023–2024 weekly chart performance for "Players"
| Chart (2023–2024) | Peak position |
|---|---|
| Australia (ARIA) | 7 |
| Austria (Ö3 Austria Top 40) | 44 |
| Belgium (Ultratop 50 Wallonia) | 4 |
| Canada Hot 100 (Billboard) | 10 |
| Canada CHR/Top 40 (Billboard) | 6 |
| Canada Hot AC (Billboard) | 22 |
| CIS Airplay (TopHit) | 41 |
| Denmark (Tracklisten) | 25 |
| Estonia Airplay (TopHit) | 30 |
| France (SNEP) | 45 |
| Germany (GfK) | 44 |
| Global 200 (Billboard) | 17 |
| Greece International (IFPI) | 18 |
| Iceland (Tónlistinn) | 14 |
| Ireland (IRMA) | 7 |
| Latvia (LAIPA) | 19 |
| Latvia Airplay (LAIPA) | 1 |
| Lithuania (AGATA) | 13 |
| Lithuania Airplay (TopHit) | 15 |
| Luxembourg (Billboard) | 20 |
| Netherlands (Single Top 100) | 62 |
| New Zealand (Recorded Music NZ) | 6 |
| Norway (VG-lista) | 34 |
| Philippines (Billboard) | 23 |
| Poland (Polish Airplay Top 100) | 29 |
| Poland (Polish Streaming Top 100) | 91 |
| Portugal (AFP) | 88 |
| Romania Airplay (Media Forest) | 1 |
| San Marino (SMRRTV Top 50) | 25 |
| Slovakia Singles Digital (ČNS IFPI) | 67 |
| Suriname (Nationale Top 40) | 1 |
| Sweden (Sverigetopplistan) | 78 |
| Switzerland (Schweizer Hitparade) | 32 |
| Turkey (Radiomonitor Türkiye) | 2 |
| Ukraine Airplay (TopHit) David Guetta Remix | 46 |
| UK Singles (Official Charts) | 7 |
| UK Hip Hop/R&B (Official Charts) | 5 |
| US Billboard Hot 100 | 9 |
| US Adult Pop Airplay (Billboard) | 29 |
| US Dance Airplay (Billboard) | 15 |
| US Hot R&B/Hip-Hop Songs (Billboard) | 4 |
| US Pop Airplay (Billboard) | 8 |
| US Rhythmic Airplay (Billboard) | 1 |

2026 chart performance for "Players"
| Chart (2026) | Peak position |
|---|---|
| Romania Airplay (TopHit) | 90 |

=== Monthly charts ===
Monthly chart performance for "Players"
| Chart (2023) | Peak position |
|---|---|
| CIS Airplay (TopHit) | 47 |
| Estonia Airplay (TopHit) | 29 |
| Lithuania Airplay (TopHit) | 44 |
| Romania Airplay (TopHit) | 5 |
| Slovakia (Singles Digitál – Top 100) | 85 |

=== Year-end charts ===
Year-end chart performance for "Players"
| Chart (2023) | Position |
|---|---|
| Australia (ARIA) | 31 |
| Belgium (Ultratop 50 Wallonia) | 45 |
| Canada (Canadian Hot 100) | 30 |
| Estonia Airplay (TopHit) | 109 |
| Global 200 (Billboard) | 108 |
| Lithuania Airplay (TopHit) | 168 |
| New Zealand (Recorded Music NZ) | 25 |
| Romania Airplay (TopHit) | 40 |
| UK Singles (OCC) | 54 |
| US Billboard Hot 100 | 33 |
| US Hot R&B/Hip-Hop Songs (Billboard) | 11 |
| US Mainstream Top 40 (Billboard) | 27 |
| US Rhythmic (Billboard) | 5 |

== Certifications ==
Certifications for "Players"
| Region | Certification | Certified units/sales |
|---|---|---|
| Australia (ARIA) | 5× Platinum | 350,000^{‡} |
| Belgium (BRMA) | Gold | 20,000^{‡} |
| Brazil (Pro-Música Brasil) | 2× Platinum | 80,000^{‡} |
| Canada (Music Canada) | 3× Platinum | 240,000^{‡} |
| Denmark (IFPI Danmark) | Gold | 45,000^{‡} |
| France (SNEP) | Platinum | 200,000^{‡} |
| Italy (FIMI) | Gold | 50,000^{‡} |
| New Zealand (RMNZ) | 2× Platinum | 60,000^{‡} |
| Poland (ZPAV) | Platinum | 50,000^{‡} |
| Switzerland (IFPI Switzerland) | Gold | 10,000^{‡} |
| United Kingdom (BPI) | Platinum | 600,000^{‡} |
| United States (RIAA) | Platinum | 1,000,000^{‡} |
Streaming
| Greece (IFPI Greece) | Gold | 1,000,000^{†} |
^{‡} Sales+streaming figures based on certification alone.^{†} Streaming-only figures based on certification alone.
