= Coi Leray =

American rapper and singer (born 1997)

- Leray performing in 2026

Background information
- Born: Coi Leray Collins; May 11, 1997 (age 29); Boston, Massachusetts, U.S.
- Origin: Hackensack, New Jersey, U.S.
- Genres: Hip-hop; pop
- Occupations: Rapper; singer; songwriter
- Works: Coi Leray discography
- Years active: 2018–present
- Labels: Epic; Island; 1801; Republic; Uptown
- Father: Benzino
- Partner: Trippie Redd (2019; 2024–2025)
- Children: 1
- Website: coileray.com

Coi Leray Collins (Note: According to Collins herself, her real name is Coi Leray Collins; other sources cite her name as Brittany Collins.) (born May 11, 1997) is an American rapper and singer. The daughter of rapper and media executive Benzino, she began her musical career in 2018 with the release of her debut mixtape, Everythingcoz. She signed with Republic Records to release her second mixtape EC2 (2019) and debut extended play, Now or Never (2020). In 2021, the Lil Durk remix of her song "No More Parties" peaked within the top 40 of the Billboard Hot 100 and received double platinum certification by the Recording Industry Association of America (RIAA).

Her 2022 single, "Blick Blick" (with Nicki Minaj) found similar chart success and preceded the release of her debut studio album, Trendsetter (2022). Later that year, her song "Players" peaked within the top ten of the Billboard Hot 100, received platinum certification, and served as lead single for her second studio album, Coi (2023). Her 2023 single, "Baby Don't Hurt Me" (with David Guetta and Anne-Marie) entered the top 20 of the UK Singles Chart.

== Early life ==
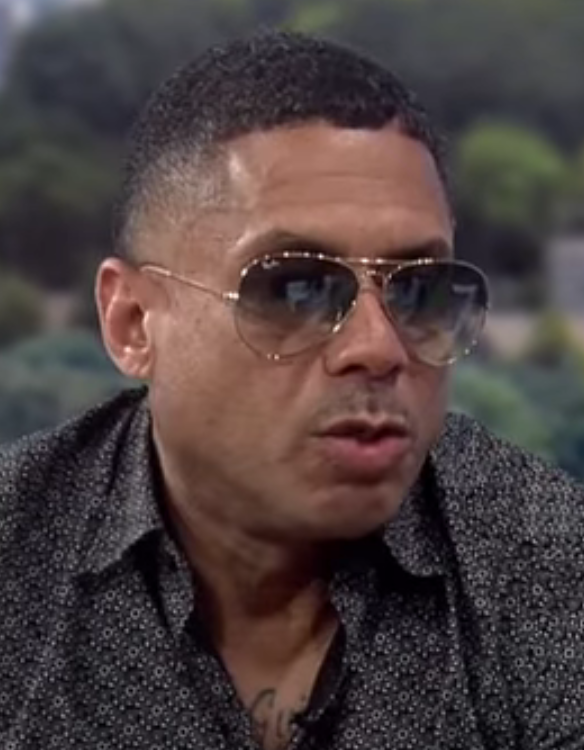
Leray is the daughter of media mogul and former co-owner of The Source, Benzino (pictured)

Coi Leray Collins was born on May 11, 1997, in Boston, Massachusetts, and raised in Hackensack, New Jersey. She is the only daughter of rapper and media mogul Benzino and a mother who worked as a bartender, whose name is completely anonymous to the public.

She has five brothers (three older and two younger), including rapper Chavo (born August 11, 1993) who is the eldest. Leray's parents divorced after her father left The Source. She started making music at age 14. In 2011, inspired by her father, she started rapping and released her first songs under the name Coi Leray—"Bow Down", with her brother Taj, and "Rock Back"—via YouTube. However, both Leray and her brother stopped rapping shortly after. At age 16, Leray dropped out of high school and started working in sales.

== Career ==
=== 2018–2020: Career beginnings ===
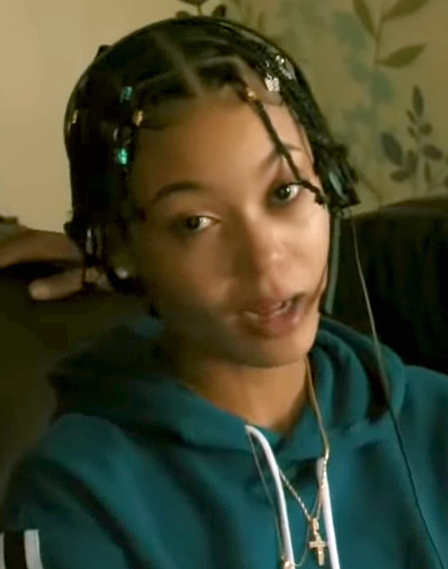
Leray in 2018

After quitting her job, Leray released her debut single, a response to A Boogie wit da Hoodie's song "DTB" titled "G.A.N.", in 2018 through SoundCloud. Her breakout single, "Huddy", and her debut mixtape, Everythingcoz, were both released in 2018.

In December 2018, she was included as a featured artist alongside LouGotCash on the track "Save the Day" by American rapper Ski Mask the Slump God and singer Jacquees from the soundtrack album for the 2018 film Spider-Man: Into the Spider-Verse. Her second mixtape, EC2, was released on January 18, 2019, through 1801 Records and Republic Records. She accompanied American rapper Trippie Redd on his Life's a Trip Tour in early 2019, and released the single "Good Days" in March 2019. She appeared as a featured artist on the song "Everything BoZ" by Trippie Redd from his second studio album, !. In April 2020, she released the single "Better Days" with American rapper Fetty Wap, and was featured on the remix of American actress Keke Palmer's single "Sticky" in May 2020. Leray released her debut extended play, Now or Never, in August 2020.

=== 2021–present: Trendsetter and Coi ===
Leray's single "No More Parties" was released in January 2021, and became her first song to appear on the Billboard Hot 100, peaking at number 26. A remix of the song featuring American rapper Lil Durk was released in February 2021, for which a music video was directed by Reel Goats and released the following month. "No More Parties" was certified platinum by the Recording Industry Association of America (RIAA) in May 2021. Leray released the single "Big Purr (Prrdd)" in March 2021, featuring vocals from American rapper Pooh Shiesty, which debuted at number 69 on the Billboard Hot 100. She starred in the music video for American rapper Mooski's single "Track Star" in April 2021, and is starring in the Whistle series Coi Vs. as of April 2021. Also in April 2021, she made her television debut, performing "No More Parties" on The Tonight Show Starring Jimmy Fallon, and was featured on the remix of Pressa's song "Attachments".

In May 2021, Leray released the single "Bout Me" and appeared as a featured artist on EarthGang's remix of their song "Options". A clip of her performing to a motionless, silent crowd at H-Town Memorial Day Mayhem in May 2021 went viral. The following month, another clip of her performing to an unresponsive crowd at Rolling Loud Miami went viral. She was featured on Rich the Kid's song "Boss Bitch" and the remix of YN Jay's song "Triple S", and released the song "At the Top", featuring Kodak Black and Mustard, in June 2021. She was included on the XXL Freshman Class of 2021 that same month. Her participation in the 2021 XXL Freshman Cypher was widely mocked across social media and by critics. Leray was nominated for Best Female Hip-Hop Artist and Best New Artist at the BET Awards 2021. She also appeared on the song "Ocean Prime" from Bfb Da Packman's debut album, Fat Niggas Need Love Too, in June 2021.

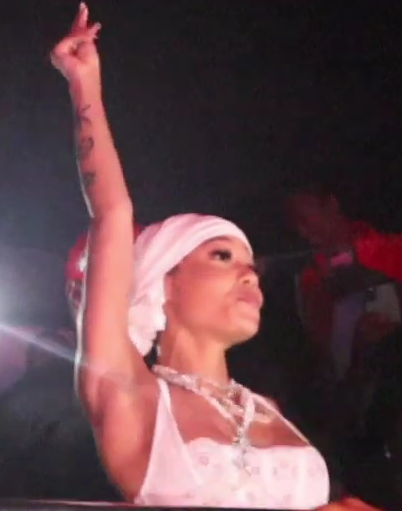
Leray performing at the Cosmopolitan Atlanta in 2021

In July 2021, Leray was featured on the remix of Sleepy Hallow's "2055", and appeared on the single "What U Want" with Lil Xxel and Tyga. She released the single "Okay Yeah!" in August 2021. In September 2021, she released the single "Twinnem" with a music video for the song. The song went viral on TikTok, and a remix of the song featuring DaBaby was released in November 2021. Also in September, she began touring as an opening act for Lil Baby's The Back Outside Tour alongside Lil Durk. She was featured on Lonr's song "Cuffin" from his mixtape Land of Nothing Real 2 in October 2021. At the 2021 BET Hip Hop Awards, she was nominated for Best New Hip Hop Artist.

On March 18, 2022, Leray released a collaboration with Nicki Minaj, titled "Blick Blick", which debuted and peaked at number 37 on the Billboard Hot 100. Leray released her debut studio album, Trendsetter, on April 8, 2022. In November 2022, Leray released "Players". It became her first solo song to chart on the Billboard Hot 100, as well as her first top-10 hit on the chart when it peaked at number nine in 2023. The song benefited from remixes, including a Jersey club remix by DJ Smallz 732.

In January 2023, Leray was featured on the song "Happy Fools" from Tomorrow X Together's fifth mini album, The Name Chapter: Temptation. Leray's collaborative single with David Guetta and Anne-Marie, "Baby Don't Hurt Me", was released in April 2023. The song peaked at number 48 on the Billboard Hot 100 and at number 13 on the UK Singles Chart. She also collaborated on the track "Self Love" with Metro Boomin, which was included on the soundtrack for Spider-Man: Across the Spider-Verse. On June 23, 2023, Leray released her second studio album, Coi.

==== Post-Coi EP releases ====
Soon after the release of her Coi album, Leray released a 5 song feature-less EP titled Blue Moon on August 30, 2023. The title of the project reflects the blue moon phenomenon that took place that same month. Many detractors assumed that Leray released this project so quickly after the "Coi" album due to its disappointing sales and reception and she wanted to move on from it. Coi herself described the EP in an Instagram post as her getting more vulnerable, raw and honest with her music. Leray stated she was tired of "trying" to do different sounds on her recent releases and instead wanted to stick to what she knew best.

In 2024, in addition to doing various features for G-Eazy for his "Freak Show" album and for Shenseea for her "Never Gets Late Here" album, Coi also released an EP titled "Lemon Cars" on May 24. Leray described one track on the project "Wanna Come Thru" and the project as a whole as her entering her "Grown and Sexy Era". Believing that as women get older, they should embrace their womanhood and tap in more to their femininity. The EP contained 6 tracks with the only feature being Detroit rapper Skilla Baby on the track "Coke Bottle Body".

On February 12, 2025, a month after announcing her pregnancy by rapper Trippie Redd, Coi released another 5 song EP titled "What Happened To Forever?". This project marked her first to be released under Epic Records after leaving Republic Records. The project covered the topics of grief, heartbreak and infidelity, all things that Coi has revealed to fans she deals with internally due to her past relationship with Trippie Redd.

== Influences ==
Leray has cited Missy Elliott, Lady Gaga, Avril Lavigne, Doja Cat, Bon Jovi, Chief Keef, Chris Brown, and Slick Woods as inspirations.

== Personal life ==
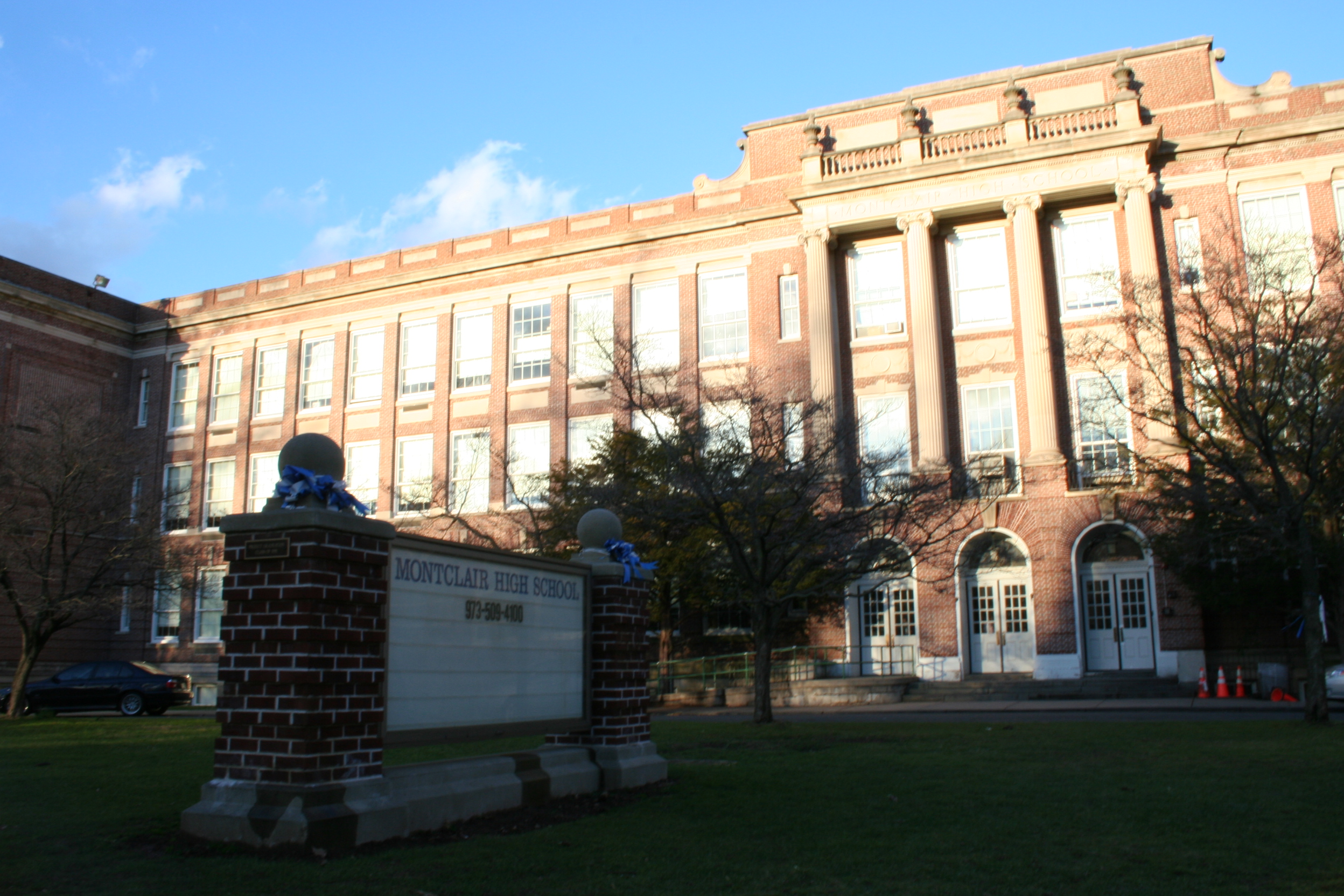
Leray received an honorary diploma from Montclair High School (pictured) in 2021

In 2021, Leray received an honorary diploma from Montclair High School in Montclair, New Jersey. As of 2021, she lives in Los Angeles.

Leray briefly dated rapper Trippie Redd in 2019. They rekindled their relationship in August 2024. On January 1, 2025, it was announced that Leray and Redd were expecting a child together. Six months later, she gave birth to their daughter.

In April 2026, Leray confirmed that she was dating internet personality Justin Laboy.

== Discography ==
- Trendsetter (2022)
- Coi (2023)
- Multi (2027)

== Awards and nominations ==
Award	Year	Nominee	Category	Result	Ref
BET Awards	2021	Herself	Best New Artist	Nominated	
BET Awards	2021	Herself	Best Female Hip Hop Artist	Nominated	
BET Awards	2023	Herself	Best Female Hip Hop Artist	Nominated	
BET Awards	2023	"Players"	BET Her	Nominated	
BET Awards	2026	Herself	Best Female Hip Hop Artist	Nominated	
BET Hip Hop Awards	2021	Herself	Best New Hip hop Artist	Nominated	
BET Hip Hop Awards	2023	Herself	Best Live Performer	Nominated	
BET Hip Hop Awards	2023	"Players"	Song of the Year	Nominated	
BET Hip Hop Awards	2023	"Players" (DJ Smallz 732 Remix)	Best Hip Hop Video	Nominated	
BET Hip Hop Awards	2023	"Players" (DJ Saige Remix)	Best Collaboration	Nominated	
BET Hip Hop Awards	2023	Coi	Hip Hop Album of the Year	Nominated	
Grammy Awards	2024	"Baby Don't Hurt Me" (with David Guetta & Anne-Marie)	Best Pop Dance Recording	Nominated	
Grammy Awards	2024	"Players"	Best Rap Performance	Nominated	
iHeartRadio Music Awards	2022	Herself	Best New Hip hop Artist	Nominated	
MTV Europe Music Awards	2023	Herself	Best New	Nominated	
MTV Europe Music Awards	2023	"Baby Don't Hurt Me" (with David Guetta & Anne-Marie)	Best Collaboration	Nominated	
Nickelodeon Kids' Choice Awards	2024	"Baby Don't Hurt Me" (with David Guetta & Anne-Marie)	Favourite Music Collaboration	Nominated	
NRJ Music Awards	2023	"Baby Don't Hurt Me" (with David Guetta & Anne-Marie)	Best Recovery/Adaptation	Nominated	
