= Saweetie discography =

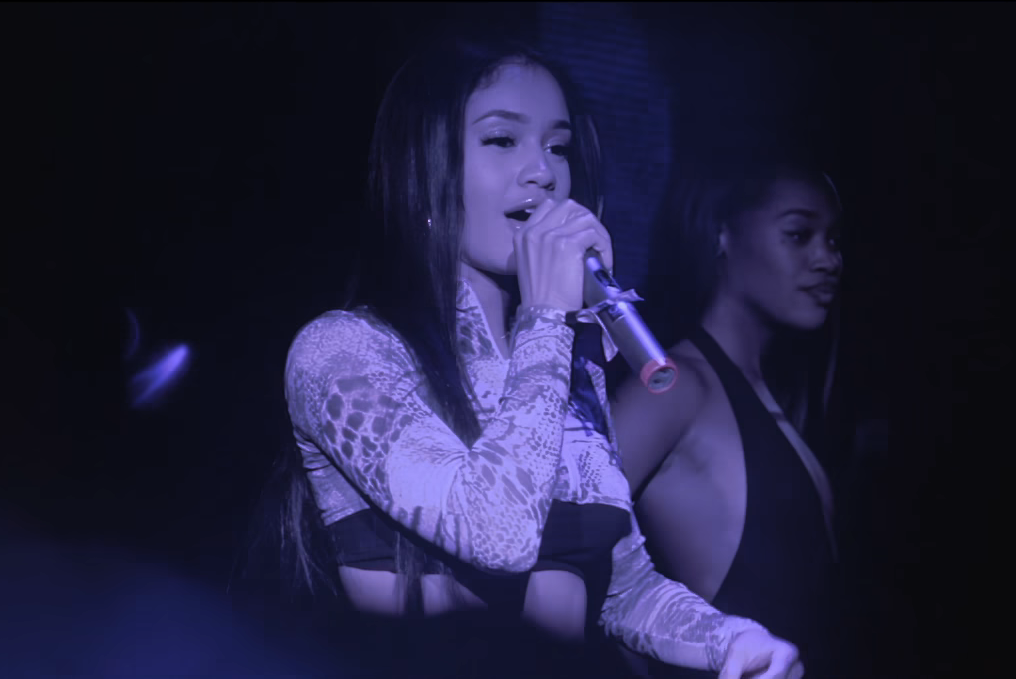
- Saweetie performing in 2019
- EPs: 6
- Singles: 19
- Music videos: 19
- Promotional singles: 3

The discography of Saweetie, an American rapper, consists of six extended plays, nineteen singles (including eight as a featured artist), three promotional singles and nineteen music videos. Her debut extended play, High Maintenance was released on March 16, 2018. The EP was preceded by her debut single, "Icy Grl", which was later certified platinum in the United States. Her second EP, Icy, was released in March 2019, and spawned the hit single "My Type". The single went on to peak at number 21 on the Billboard Hot 100 and was certified triple platinum in the United States.

Saweetie's debut studio album, Pretty Bitch Music, is still yet to be released. The album has been preceded by the singles "Tap In", "Back to the Streets" featuring Jhené Aiko, "Best Friend" featuring Doja Cat, "Fast (Motion)", and "Closer" featuring H.E.R., as well as the promotional single "Pretty Bitch Freestyle". In 2021, "Tap In" was certified Platinum in the United States by RIAA. In November 2022, Saweetie released her fourth EP, The Single Life.

In 2021, the rapper released her first remix EP, Best Friend [Remix EP], followed by an expanded edition, which featured guest appearances from rappers and producers including Stefflon Don, Chanmina, JessB and Kito.

== Studio albums ==
List of studio albums, with selected details
Title	Details
Pretty Bitch Music	Released: TBA; Label: Icy, Artistry, Warner; Formats: Digital download, streaming

== Extended plays ==
List of extended plays, with selected details and chart positions
Title	Details	Peak chart positions	
Title	Details	US	US R&B/HH Sales
High Maintenance	Released: March 16, 2018; Label: Warner, Artistry; Formats: CD, digital download, streaming	— (Note: High Maintenance did not enter the Billboard 200, but did peak at number 20 on the Heatseekers Albums chart.)	32
Icy	Released: March 29, 2019; Label: Warner, Artistry; Formats: Digital download, streaming	85	50
Pretty Summer Playlist: Season 1	Released: April 16, 2021; Label: Warner, Artistry; Formats: Digital download, streaming	—	—
The Single Life	Released: November 18, 2022; Label: Warner, Artistry; Formats: Digital download, streaming	—	—
Pretty Hu$tler Mix	Released: May 3, 2024; Label: Warner, Artistry; Formats: Digital download, streaming	—	—
Dear Big Santa	Released: November 1, 2024; Label: Warner, Artistry; Formats: Digital download, streaming	—	—
Hella Pressure	Released: August 1, 2025; Label: Warner, Artistry; Formats: Digital download, streaming	—	—
"—" denotes a recording that did not chart or was not released in that territory.

== Singles ==
=== As lead artist ===
List of singles showing year released, chart positions, certifications and album name
Title	Year	Peak chart positions										Certifications	Album
Title	Year	US	US R&B/HH	US Rap	US Rhy.	AUS	CAN	GER	IRE	NZ	UK	Certifications	Album
"Icy Grl"	2017	— (Note: "Icy Grl" did not enter the Billboard Hot 100, but peaked at number six on the Bubbling Under Hot 100 chart.)	—	—	16	—	—	—	—	—	—	RIAA: 2× Platinum; BPI: Silver; MC: Platinum; RMNZ: Gold	High Maintenance
"Up Now" (with London on da Track featuring G-Eazy and Rich the Kid)	2018	—	—	—	16	—	—	—	—	—	—		Non-album single
"My Type"	2019	21	10	8	1	— (Note: "My Type" did not enter the Australian Singles Chart, but peaked at number 9 on the Australian Hitseekers chart.)	76	—	—	— (Note: "My Type" did not enter the NZ Top 40 Singles Chart, but peaked at number 32 on the NZ Hot Singles Chart.)	—	RIAA: 4× Platinum; ARIA: Gold; BPI: Silver; MC: 4× Platinum; RMNZ: 2× Platinum	Icy
"Come On" (with City Girls featuring DJ Durel)	2019	—	—	—	—	—	—	—	—	—	—		Control the Streets, Vol. 2
"Bitch from da Souf (Remix)" (with Latto and Trina)	2019	95	37	—	—	—	—	—	—	—	—		Queen of da Souf
"Sway with Me" (with Galxara)	2020	— (Note: "Sway with Me" did not enter the Billboard Hot 100, but peaked at number 44 on the Digital Songs chart.)	—	—	—	—	— (Note: "Sway with Me" did not enter the Canadian Hot 100, but peaked at number 35 on the Canadian Digital Songs chart.)	—	—	— (Note: "Sway with Me" did not enter the NZ Top 40 Singles Chart, but peaked at number 32 on the NZ Hot Singles Chart.)	—		Birds of Prey
"Tap In"	2020	20	9	8	2	37	46	—	35	38	38	RIAA: Platinum; BPI: Silver; MC: 2× Platinum; RMNZ: Platinum	Pretty Bitch Music
"Money Mouf" (with Tyga and YG)	2020	—	— (Note: "Money Mouf" did not enter the Hot R&B/Hip-Hop Songs, but peaked at number 12 on the R&B/Hip-Hop Digital Songs chart.)	— (Note: "Money Mouf" did not enter the Hot Rap Songs, but peaked at number 9 on the Rap Digital Songs chart.)	—	—	—	—	—	—	—		Non-album single
"Back to the Streets" (featuring Jhené Aiko)	2020	58	21	16	1	—	—	—	—	— (Note: "Back to the Streets" did not enter the NZ Top 40 Singles Chart, but peaked at number 17 on the NZ Hot Singles Chart.)	—	RIAA: Platinum; MC: Gold; RMNZ: Gold	Pretty Bitch Music
"Best Friend" (featuring Doja Cat)	2021	14	7	6	1	35	40	1	36	39	35	RIAA: 4× Platinum; ARIA: Gold; BPI: Gold; MC: 4× Platinum; RMNZ: 2× Platinum	Pretty Bitch Music
"Slow Clap" (with Gwen Stefani)	2021	—	—	—	—	—	—	—	—	—	—		Non-album single
"Fast (Motion)"	2021	— (Note: "Fast (Motion)" did not enter the Billboard Hot 100, but peaked at number 24 on the Bubbling Under Hot 100 chart.)	—	—	11	—	—	—	—	— (Note: "Fast (Motion)" did not enter the NZ Top 40 Singles Chart, but peaked at number 34 on the NZ Hot Singles Chart.)	—		Pretty Bitch Music
"Get It Girl"	2021	—	—	—	—	—	—	—	—	—	—		Insecure
"Icy Chain"	2021	—	—	—	34	—	—	—	—	—	—		Non-album single
"Closer" (featuring H.E.R.)	2022	89	30	—	9	—	—	—	—	— (Note: "Closer" did not enter the NZ Top 40 Singles Chart, but peaked at number 18 on the NZ Hot Singles Chart.)	—		Pretty Bitch Music
"In My Face" (with Mozzy and 2 Chainz featuring YG)	2022	—	—	—	—	—	—	—	—	—	—		Survivor's Guilt
"Baby Boo" (with Muni Long)	2022	—	—	—	—	—	—	—	—	— (Note: "Baby Boo" did not enter the NZ Top 40 Singles Chart, but peaked at number 28 on the NZ Hot Singles Chart.)	—		Public Displays of Affection: The Album
"Don't Say Nothin'"	2022	—	—	—	—	—	—	—	—	—	—		The Single Life
"Hey Mickey!" (with Baby Tate)	2023	—	—	—	—	—	—	—	—	—	—		Non-album single
"Shot O'Clock"	2023	—	—	—	—	—	—	—	—	—	—		TBA
"Birthday" (with YG and Tyga)	2023	—	—	—	9	—	—	—	—	—	—		TBA
"Feels" (with Nissy)	2023	—	—	—	—	—	—	—	—	—	—		Non-album single
"Do It for the Bay" (with P-Lo)	2024	—	—	—	—	—	—	—	—	—	—		TBA
"Khutti" (with Diljit Dosanjh)	2024	—	—	—	—	—	—	—	—	— (Note: "Khutti" did not enter the NZ Top 40 Singles Chart, but peaked at number 32 on the NZ Hot Singles Chart.)	—		TBA
"Richtivities"	2024	—	—	—	—	—	—	—	—	—	—		Pretty Hu$tler Mix
"NANi"	2024	—	48	—	1	—	—	—	—	— (Note: "Nani" did not enter the NZ Top 40 Singles Chart, but peaked at number 14 on the NZ Hot Singles Chart.)	—		TBA
"GPP" (with Liana Banks)	2024	—	—	—	—	—	—	—	—	—	—		Non-album single
"My Best"	2024	—	—	—	—	—	—	—	—	—	—		TBA
"Rock Your Hips" (with 310babii)	2024	—	—	—	2	—	—	—	—	—	—		Non-album single
"Is It the Way"	2024	—	—	—	5	—	—	—	—	—	—		TBA
"Locos" (with Santa Fe Klan)	2025	—	—	—	—	—	—	—	—	—	—		Non-album singles
"Shake It Fast"	2025	—	—	—	—	—	—	—	—	—	—		Non-album singles
"Boffum" (with J. White Did It)	2025	—	—	—	—	—	—	—	—	—	—		Hella Pressure
"Superstars" (with Twice)	2025	—	—	—	—	—	—	—	—	—	—		Hella Pressure
"Details"	2026	—	—	—	—	—	—	—	—	—	—		
"—" denotes a recording that did not chart or was not released in that territory.

=== As featured artist ===
List of singles as featured artist showing year released, chart positions, certifications and album name
Title	Year	Peak chart positions									Certifications	Album
Title	Year	US	AUS	BRA	CAN	GER	IRE	NLD	POR	UK	Certifications	Album
"You Come First" (Zak Abel featuring Saweetie)	2018	—	—	—	—	—	—	—	—	—		Non-album singles
"Body" (Glowie featuring Saweetie)	2018	—	—	—	—	—	—	—	—	—		Non-album singles
"Yuso" (Kid Ink featuring Lil Wayne and Saweetie)	2019	—	—	—	—	—	—	—	—	—		Missed Calls
"Can't Do It" (Loren Gray featuring Saweetie)	2019	—	—	—	—	—	—	—	—	—		Non-album singles
"No L's" (Hit-Boy featuring Saweetie)	2019	—	—	—	—	—	—	—	—	—		Non-album singles
"Baila Conmigo" (Yellow Claw featuring Saweetie, Inna, and Jenn Morel)	2019	—	—	—	—	—	—	—	—	—		Never Dies
"Triggered (Dance Mix)" (Jhené Aiko featuring Saweetie)	2019	—	—	—	—	—	—	—	—	—		Non-album singles
"Kings & Queens, Pt. 2" (Ava Max featuring Lauv and Saweetie)	2020	—	—	—	—	—	—	—	—	—		Non-album singles
"Confetti" (Little Mix featuring Saweetie)	2021	—	—	—	—	—	17	—	126	9	BPI: Platinum; PMB: Gold	Confetti
"Talkin' Bout" (Loui featuring Saweetie)	2021	—	—	—	—	—	—	—	—	—		Pretty Summer Playlist: Season 1
"Hit It" (Black Eyed Peas featuring Saweetie and Lele Pons)	2021	—	—	—	—	—	—	—	—	—		Non-album single
"Out Out" (Joel Corry and Jax Jones featuring Charli XCX and Saweetie)	2021	—	31	—	69	20	2	20	86	6	RIAA: Gold; AFP: Gold; ARIA: Gold; BPI: Platinum; BVMI: Gold; MC: 2× Platinum; RMNZ: Platinum	Another Friday Night
"Faking Love" (Anitta featuring Saweetie)	2021	— (Note: "Faking Love" did not enter the Billboard Hot 100, but peaked at number 36 on the Billboard Rhythmic Airplay chart.)	—	45	—	—	—	—	82	—	AFP: Gold; PMB: Diamond	Versions of Me
"Handstand" (French Montana and Doja Cat featuring Saweetie)	2021	—	—	—	—	—	—	—	—	—		They Got Amnesia
"All She Wanna Do" (John Legend featuring Saweetie)	2022	—	—	—	—	—	—	—	—	—		Legend
"All Night" (Ive featuring Saweetie)	2024	—	—	—	—	—	—	—	—	—		Non-album single
"Proclivities" (LL Cool J featuring Saweetie)	2024	—	—	—	—	—	—	—	—	—		The FORCE
"Immaculate" (Shygirl featuring Saweetie)	2024	—	—	—	—	—	—	—	—	—		Club Shy Room 2
"That Girl" (Paul Russell featuring Saweetie)	2025	—	—	—	—	—	—	—	—	—		Non-album single
"—" denotes a recording that did not chart or was not released in that territory.

=== Promotional singles ===
List of promotional singles, showing year released and album name
Title	Year	Album
"Pissed"	2018	Non-album single
"Pretty Bitch Freestyle"	2020	Pretty Hu$tler Mix
"Risky" (featuring Drakeo the Ruler)	2021	Pretty Summer Playlist: Season 1

== Other charted songs ==
List of other charted songs, with selected chart positions, showing year released and album name
Title	Year	Peak chart positions			Album
Title	Year	US Bub.	US Bub. R&B/HH	NZ Hot	Album
"Give It to Em" (Quavo featuring Saweetie)	2018	10	2	—	Quavo Huncho
"I Can't Stop Me" (Sabrina Carpenter featuring Saweetie)	2019	—	—	39	Singular: Act II
"—" denotes a recording that did not chart or was not released in that territory.

== Guest appearances ==
List of guest appearances as featured artist, with the respective artists and album name
Title	Year	Other artist(s)	Album
"Expensive"	2017	Zaytoven	Zaytown Sorority, Vol. 2
"IDGAF (Remix)"	2018	Dua Lipa	IDGAF (Remixes II)
"2002 (Remix)"	2018	Anne-Marie, Ms Banks	2002 (Remix EP)
"I'm That Bitch"	2018	David Guetta	7
"Give It to Em"	2018	Quavo	Quavo Huncho
"Stupid Things"	2018	Four of Diamonds	Non-album single
"Patience"	2018	Riri	Neo
"I Can't Stop Me"	2019	Sabrina Carpenter	Singular: Act II
"Too Much Shaft"	2019	Quavo	Shaft
"My Girlfriends Are My Boyfriends"	2021	Demi Lovato	Dancing with the Devil... the Art of Starting Over
"Move"	2021	Lil Tjay, Tyga	Destined 2 Win
"Attitude"	2021	—N/a	Bruised: Soundtrack from and Inspired by the Netflix Film
"All Night"	2024	Ive	All Night

== Music videos ==
List of music videos, with selected details
Title	Year	Director(s)
As lead artist
"Icy Grl"	2017	Bana Bongolan & Soben Phy
"Focus"	2017	Adam Small & Aramis Duran
"Anti"	2018	Bana Bongolan & Soben Phy
"B.A.N." (Vertical Video)	2018	Stephen Garnett
"Icy Grl (Bae Mix)" (featuring Kehlani)	2018	Stephen Garnett
"B.A.N."	2018	Sasha Samsonova
"Good Good"	2018	Bana Bongolan & Soben Phy
"Up Now" (with London on da Track featuring G-Eazy and Rich the Kid)	2018	Mike Ho
"Pissed"	2018	Christian Sutton
"Emotional" (featuring Quavo)	2019	Christian Sesma
"My Type (Claws Remix)"	2019	Unknown
"My Type"	2019	Daps
"Tap In"	2020	Mike Ho
"Pretty Bitch Freestyle"	2020	Bana Bongolan & Soben Phy
"Bussin 2.0" (with Tay Money)	2020	Munachi Osegbu
"Sway with Me" (with Galxara)	2020	Unknown
"Back to the Streets" (featuring Jhene Aiko)	2020	Daniel Russell
"Best Friend" (featuring Doja Cat)	2021	Dave Meyers
"Closer" (featuring H.E.R.)	2022	Hannah Lux Davis
"Feels" (with Nissy)	2023	Adam Toht & Ben Toht
"Birthday" (with YG and Tyga)	2023	Lauren Dunn
"Shot O'Clock"	2023	Lauren Dunn
"Do It for the Bay" (with P-Lo)	2024	
"Nani"	2024	
"My Best"	2024	
"Is It the Way"	2024	
"I Want You This Christmas"	2024	Jamar Harding
"Boffum" (with J. White Did It)	2025	
As featured artist
"You Come First" (Zak Abel featuring Saweetie)	2019	Roxana Baldovin
"Yuso" (Kid Ink featuring Lil Wayne and Saweetie)	2019	Mike Ho
"Confetti" (Little Mix featuring Saweetie)	2021	Samuel Douek
"All Night" (Ive ft. Saweetie)	2024	Charlotte Rutherford, Crystalline
