= Pretty Bitch Music =

Stalled debut album by US rapper Saweetie

S1*

Studio album by Saweetie
- Recorded: 2019–2027
- Labels: Icy; Artistry; Warner
- Producers: Dr. Luke; Timbaland; MTK; Federico Vindver; Angel López; Drtwrk; Rocco Did It Again!; The Monarch; Ryan Ogren; DJ Swish; Mike Crook; Kaine; Lil Aaron

Saweetie chronology
Hella Pressure (2025)	S1* (TBA)

Singles from Pretty Bitch Music
- 1. "Tap In" Released: June 17, 2020; 2. "Back to the Streets" Released: October 23, 2020; 3. "Best Friend" Released: January 7, 2021; 4. "Fast (Motion)" Released: May 7, 2021; 5. "Closer" Released: February 11, 2022

S1* (formerly known as Pretty B*tch Music) is the stalled debut studio album by American rapper Saweetie which was planned to be released by her own label Icy Records, Artistry Worldwide, and Warner Records. The album was originally due to be released on June 25, 2021, but Saweetie delayed the album in order to "reconstruct" some songs. It was expected to be supported by the singles "Tap In", "Back to the Streets" featuring Jhené Aiko, "Best Friend" featuring Doja Cat, "Fast (Motion)", and "Closer" featuring H.E.R. As of 2026, there is no official release date for Pretty Bitch Music.

== Background and release ==
In April 2020, shortly after her breakthrough single "My Type" was certified 2× platinum by the Recording Industry Association of America, Saweetie began teasing the phrase "Pretty B*tch Music" via social media. She released the lead single "Tap In" and its corresponding music video on June 17, 2020. Saweetie released the song "Pretty Bitch Freestyle" as a promotional single in July 2020 alongside a low-budget, homemade music video. Following a viral TikTok dance trend, "Tap In" became a top 40 hit in the United States, the United Kingdom, Australia, Ireland and New Zealand. The song received a remix featuring rappers Post Malone, DaBaby and Jack Harlow in August 2020. "Tap In" would also go on to be certified Gold by the Recording Industry Association of America at the time of the release of the album's second single, "Back to the Streets" featuring Jhené Aiko, on October 23, 2020. This song would later receive an accompanying music video in late November 2020. "Best Friend", the third single and first collaboration between Saweetie and rapper Doja Cat, was prematurely released on December 4, 2020, by Warner Records on various streaming services, a month before the scheduled release. Saweetie took to social to express her frustration and disappointment and called out her label. The song was officially released on January 7, 2021, alongside a music video directed by Dave Meyers.

== Singles ==
"Tap In" was released on June 17, 2020, as the album's lead single, and was serviced to contemporary hit radio on August 11, 2020. The song reached number 20 on the Billboard Hot 100, becoming Saweetie's first top 20 single while also marking Saweetie's second appearance on the chart. A remix of the song featuring Post Malone, DaBaby, and Jack Harlow was released on August 28, 2020. In 2021, the song was certified Platinum by the RIAA.

The second single "Back to the Streets" featuring Jhené Aiko was released on October 23, 2020. The song debuted at number 73 on the Billboard Hot 100, later peaking at number 58 on the chart. The single also reached number 1 on the US Rhythmic chart, and received a Gold certification in the United States.

"Best Friend" featuring Doja Cat was prematurely released on December 4, 2020, by Saweetie's label Warner Records and Saweetie stated that she felt disrespected by the label for leaking the song before release. The song was then officially released a month later and debuted at number 39 on the Billboard Hot 100, later reaching number 14 on the chart, becoming Saweetie's second top-20 single and her highest-charting song on the chart. The song achieved a multi-platinum certification in the United States and a Gold certification in Canada. The song also earned Saweetie and Doja Cat a nomination at the 64th Annual Grammy Awards for "Best Rap Song".

The fourth single "Fast (Motion)" was released on May 7, 2021. It peaked at number 24 on the Bubbling Under Hot 100 chart, and number 11 on the US Rhythmic chart.

The fifth single "Closer" featuring H.E.R. was released on February 11, 2022. The song debuted at number 89 on the Billboard Hot 100, and number 7 on the US Rhythmic chart.

== Composition and concept ==
Saweetie told gal-dem that Pretty Bitch Music focuses on "exponential growth and producing artistry" and that it was made with the intent of wanting people to have fun and feel sexy and confident, while also presenting the importance of showing an example of women "being about your business".

== Promotion ==
Before its official release, Saweetie performed a solo version of "Best Friend" for the first time as a 2020/21 New Year's Eve performance for Bud Light Seltzer, where she also performed the album's singles "Back to the Streets" and "Tap In". She also performed "Best Friend" and "Tap In" at the Triller Fight Club.
