= List of Billboard Rhythmic number-one songs of the 2020s =

This is the list of songs which reached number one on the Rhythmic chart in Billboard magazine during the 2020s.

== Number-one rhythmic hits of the 2020s ==
↓↑ – Song's run at number one was non-consecutive
† – Number-one rhythmic song of the year

Reached number one	Song	Artist(s)	Weeks at number one
2020
December 28, 2019	"Leave Em Alone"	Layton Greene, Lil Baby, City Girls & PnB Rock	3
January 18	"Ballin'"↓↑	Mustard featuring Roddy Ricch	2
January 25	"Roxanne"↓↑	Arizona Zervas	3
February 8	"Heartless"	The Weeknd	1
February 22	"The Box" ↓↑	Roddy Ricch	6
March 21	"Life Is Good"	Future featuring Drake	1
March 28	"Best on Earth"	Russ featuring Bia	1
April 18	"Say So"	Doja Cat	3
May 9	"Toosie Slide"	Drake	3
May 30	"Savage"	Megan Thee Stallion featuring Beyoncé	2
June 13	"High Fashion"	Roddy Ricch featuring Mustard	1
June 20	"Blueberry Faygo"	Lil Mosey	2
July 4	"Rockstar" † ↓↑	DaBaby featuring Roddy Ricch	9
July 18	"Whats Poppin"	Jack Harlow featuring DaBaby, Tory Lanez, and Lil Wayne	1
August 1	"Go Crazy"	Chris Brown featuring Young Thug	1
September 19	"Popstar"	DJ Khaled featuring Drake	1
September 26	"WAP"	Cardi B featuring Megan Thee Stallion	1
October 3	"Laugh Now Cry Later"	Drake featuring Lil Durk	5
November 7	"Mood"	24kGoldn featuring Iann Dior	3
November 28	"Lemonade"	Internet Money and Gunna featuring Don Toliver and Nav	2
December 12	"For the Night"↓↑	Pop Smoke featuring Lil Baby and DaBaby	5
December 26	"B.S."	Jhené Aiko and H.E.R.	1
2021
January 23	"Back to the Streets"	Saweetie featuring Jhené Aiko	1
January 30	"What You Know Bout Love" †↓↑	Pop Smoke	4
February 13	"Body"	Megan Thee Stallion	1
March 6	"Whoopty"	CJ	1
March 13	"34+35"	Ariana Grande	1
March 20	"Up"	Cardi B	3
April 10	"Best Friend"	Saweetie featuring Doja Cat	1
April 17	"You're Mines Still"	Yung Bleu featuring Drake	1
April 24	"What's Next"	Drake	1
May 1	"Leave the Door Open"	Silk Sonic (Bruno Mars & Anderson .Paak)	1
May 8	"Peaches"↓↑	Justin Bieber featuring Daniel Caesar and Giveon	6
May 15	"Calling My Phone"	Lil Tjay featuring 6lack	1
June 26	"Kiss Me More"	Doja Cat featuring SZA	2
July 10	"Rapstar"	Polo G	3
July 31	"Late at Night"	Roddy Ricch	2
August 14	"Telepatía"	Kali Uchis	2
August 28	"You Right"	Doja Cat & The Weeknd	4
September 25	"Industry Baby"	Lil Nas X and Jack Harlow	4
October 23	"Way 2 Sexy"	Drake featuring Future and Young Thug	2
November 6	"Need to Know" ↓↑	Doja Cat	5
November 27	"Chosen"	Blxst and Tyga featuring Ty Dolla Sign	3
2022
January 1	"Big Energy" † ↓↑	Latto	7
January 22	"Love Nwantiti (Ah Ah Ah)"	CKay	2
February 5	"Smokin Out the Window"	Silk Sonic (Bruno Mars & Anderson .Paak)	1
February 12	"One Right Now"	Post Malone and The Weeknd	1
March 19	"I Hate U"	SZA	1
March 26	"Woman"	Doja Cat	5
April 30	"To the Moon"	JNR CHOI and Sam Tompkins	2
May 14	"Freaky Deaky"	Tyga and Doja Cat	1
May 21	"First Class" ↓↑	Jack Harlow	9
July 2	"Wait for U"	Future featuring Drake and Tems	1
July 30	"Cooped Up"	Post Malone featuring Roddy Ricch	1
August 6	"About Damn Time"	Lizzo	1
August 13	"I Like You (A Happier Song)"↓↑	Post Malone featuring Doja Cat	4
August 20	"Break My Soul"	Beyoncé	3
October 1	"Super Freaky Girl" ↓↑	Nicki Minaj	4
October 8	"Jimmy Cooks"	Drake featuring 21 Savage	1
October 29	"Staying Alive"	DJ Khaled featuring Drake and Lil Baby	1
November 5	"Bad Habit"	Steve Lacy	1
November 19	"Vegas"	Doja Cat	1
November 26	"Toxic"	YG	1
December 3	"Under the Influence" ↓↑	Chris Brown	6
December 10	"Cuff It"	Beyoncé	1
December 17	"Sunshine"	Tyga, Pop Smoke and Jhené Aiko	1
2023
January 28	"Rich Flex"	Drake and 21 Savage	2
February 11	"Creepin'"	Metro Boomin, The Weeknd and 21 Savage	3
March 4	"Kill Bill"↓↑	SZA	3
March 18	"Players"	Coi Leray	6
May 6	"Calm Down" † ↓↑	Rema and Selena Gomez	4
May 20	"Boy's a Liar Pt. 2"	PinkPantheress and Ice Spice	1
June 10	"Search & Rescue"	Drake	2
June 24	"What It Is (Block Boy)"	Doechii featuring Kodak Black	1
July 1	"All My Life"↓↑	Lil Durk featuring J. Cole	5
July 15	"Snooze"	SZA	2
August 5	"Princess Diana"	Ice Spice featuring Nicki Minaj	1
August 26	"Barbie World"	Nicki Minaj and Ice Spice with Aqua	4
September 23	"FukUMean"	Gunna	2
October 7	"Paint the Town Red"	Doja Cat	7
November 25	"I Know ?"	Travis Scott	1
December 2	"Rich Baby Daddy"	Drake featuring Sexyy Red and SZA	2
December 16	"Water"	Tyla	1
December 23	"Agora Hills"	Doja Cat	2
2024
January 6	"Lovin on Me" † ↓↑	Jack Harlow	10
February 17	"Everybody"	Nicki Minaj featuring Lil Uzi Vert	3
March 9	"Surround Sound"	JID featuring 21 Savage and Baby Tate	1
March 30	"Soak City (Do It)"	310babii	2
April 27	"Redrum"	21 Savage	2
May 11	"Saturn"	SZA	1
May 18	"Like That"	Future, Metro Boomin and Kendrick Lamar	4
June 15	"Not Like Us" ↓↑	Kendrick Lamar	12
July 6	"Million Dollar Baby"	Tommy Richman	3
September 14	"Nani"	Saweetie	1
October 5	"Kehlani"	Jordan Adetunji	3
October 26	"Mamushi"	Megan Thee Stallion featuring Yuki Chiba	1
November 2	"Prove It"	21 Savage and Summer Walker	2
November 16	"Residuals"	Chris Brown	1
November 23	"Timeless"	The Weeknd and Playboi Carti	4
December 21	"Too Fast"	Future	1
December 28	"Whatchu Kno About Me"	GloRilla and Sexyy Red	3
2025
January 18	"Squabble Up"	Kendrick Lamar	2
February 1	"Sticky"	Tyler, the Creator featuring GloRilla, Sexyy Red and Lil Wayne	1
February 8	"TV Off"↓↑	Kendrick Lamar featuring Lefty Gunplay	4
March 1	"Luther" †	Kendrick Lamar and SZA	1
March 8	"30 for 30"	SZA and Kendrick Lamar	2
March 29	"Tweaker"	Gelo	1
April 5	"Denial Is a River"	Doechii	3
April 26	"Cry for Me"	The Weeknd	1
May 3	"Anxiety"	Doechii	2
May 17	"Nokia"	Drake	2
May 31	"Peekaboo"	Kendrick Lamar featuring AzChike	2
June 14	"Mutt"	Leon Thomas	3
July 5	"Somebody Loves Me"	PartyNextDoor and Drake	1
July 12	"Rather Lie"	Playboi Carti and The Weeknd	2
July 26	"Burning Blue"	Mariah the Scientist	1
August 2	"Shake It to the Max (Fly)"	Moliy and Silent Addy featuring Skillibeng and Shenseea	2
August 16	"Outside"	Cardi B	1
August 23	"What Did I Miss?"	Drake	3
September 13	"Yukon"	Justin Bieber	3
October 4	"Folded"	Kehlani	1
October 11	"Which One"	Drake and Central Cee	1
October 18	"It Depends"	Chris Brown featuring Bryson Tiller	3
November 8	"Safe"	Cardi B featuring Kehlani	2
November 22	"Jealous Type"	Doja Cat	1
November 29	"Sugar on My Tongue"	Tyler, the Creator	3
December 20	"Is It a Crime"	Mariah the Scientist featuring Kali Uchis	2
2026
January 3	"WGFT"	Gunna featuring Burna Boy	4
January 31	"Take Me Thru Dere"	Metro Boomin, Quavo, Breskii, and YK Niece	1
February 7	"ErrTime"	Cardi B	2
February 21	"I Just Might"	Bruno Mars	3
March 14	"Chanel"	Tyla	1
March 21	"What You Saying"	Lil Uzi Vert	1
March 28	"Ever Since U Left Me (I Went Deaf)"	French Montana and Max B	2
April 11	"Watching Us"	Wale featuring Leon Thomas	2
April 25	"Let 'Em Know"	T.I.	2
May 9	"Body"	Don Toliver	2
May 23	"Pop Dat Thang"	DaBaby	2
June 6	"Good Flirts"	Baby Keem featuring Kendrick Lamar and Momo Boyd	2
June 20	"Obvious"	Chris Brown	1
June 27	"Motion Party"	BossMan Dlow	1
July 4	"Janice STFU"	Drake	2
July 18	"2 Hard 4 the Radio"	Drake	1
July 25	"Spend Dat"	Yung Miami	4
August 22	"Shabang"	Drake	2
September 5	"Dai Dai"	Shakira and Burna Boy	2
September 19	"Legacy"	J. Cole and PJ	1
September 26	"Ah Ha"	Cardi B	3
October 17	"Dead Fresh"	Lil Baby	1
October 24	"What You Need"	Tems	2
November 7	"So Good"	Jhené Aiko featuring Kendrick Lamar	2
November 21	"WTF Goin"	Belly Gang Kushington and 21 Savage	1
November 28	"Okayyy"	Latto featuring Doja Cat	1

== See also ==
- 2020s in music
- List of Billboard Hot 100 number-one singles of the 2020s
