= Baluga =

Baluga (Serbian Cyrillic: Балуга) is a Serbian place name. It may refer to:

- Baluga, Ljubićska, settlement in Čačak, Serbia
- Baluga, Trnavska, settlement in Čačak, Serbia

== See also ==
- Beluga (disambiguation)
