= Brandon Blackwood =

American fashion designer

- Born: Brooklyn, New York City, New York, U.S.
- Education: Bard College (BA)
- Occupation: Fashion designer
- Years active: 2015 - present
- Known for: Handbags
- Label: Brandon Blackwood New York

Brandon Blackwood is an American fashion designer and businessman. He is the CEO and founder of Brandon Blackwood New York, a fashion company that specializes in handbags and accessories.

== Life and career ==
Blackwood was born in Brooklyn, New York spent most of his upbringing between New York City and Tokyo. He has a younger brother. He is of Jamaican and Chinese descent. Blackwood developed an affinity for fashion and design at a young age, and made hand-sewn bags as gifts for his friends in middle and high school. His family encouraged him to pursue a career in STEM, which led him to initially majoring in neuroscience at Bard College. However, he eventually changed his major to American studies without the knowledge of his family until his graduation, when he obtained his bachelor's degree. While in college, he interned for Elle and Nylon magazines. After graduating, he worked at Crossroads Trading, buying and selling on-trend second-hand clothes.

He started his brand from a one night when his friends invited him out to a bar. He refused the invite because he couldn’t afford to go out as he was making $10 hour working at Crossroad Trading and CO. That same night he researched handbag manufactures throughout the tri-state until he found one in NYC. Age had his first bag made in NYC which was the Portmore backbag under a payment since he couldn’t afford the total cost. While working at Crossroads and Co, he unknowingly met an Editor for Essence magazine. He was buying her used items and he told her he made a bag. He showed the bag and two weeks later it was featured on Essence Magazine. He began saving in order to begin his business, and with the help of his mother and friend, he purchased his LLC in 2013. He launched his first line of handbags in 2015 which were featured in Essence magazine, followed by Elle and Galore.

Blackwood gained international notoriety in 2020. Wanting to take a stance in support of the Black Lives Matter protests, Blackwood created a mini-tote with the words End Systemic Racism engraved on the front. A portion of the proceeds from the bag were donated to the Lawyers' Committee for Civil Rights Under Law, which is an organization dedicated to helping racial and ethnic minorities find legal representation while fighting civil rights cases. On the creation of the bag, Blackwood stated "I was stuck creatively and exhausted by the daily news. I had a pretty solid following and decided I would take this opportunity to make something that could have a direct impact against systemic oppression." While initially only 509 bags were made, thousands more have sold.

== In popular culture ==
Blackwood's bags have been seen on several celebrities, including Lupita Nyong'o, Brie Larson, Amandla Stenberg, Cardi B, Zoë Kravitz, Solange Knowles, Keke Palmer, and Kim Kardashian. Rapper Saweetie wore one of Blackwood's totes in the music video for the song, "Fast (Motion)." "Bag (Brandon Blackwood)" was released by Hip Hop duo Trill Dollar in 2021.
