= Icy Chain =

Single by Saweetie
- Released: November 19, 2021
- Length: 1:50
- Label: Warner
- Songwriters: Saweetie; Dr. Luke; Lil Aaron; Randall Hammers; Rocco Did It Again!
- Producers: Dr. Luke; Lil Aaron; Rocco Did It Again!

Saweetie singles chronology
"Get It Girl" (2021)	"Icy Chain" (2021)	"Handstand" (2021)

"Icy Chain" is a song by American rapper Saweetie. It was released on November 19, 2021 through Warner Records. Saweetie performed the song on Saturday Night Live the night following its release.

== Background and release ==
Saweetie released "Icy Chain" on November 19, 2021, ahead of her Saturday Night Live debut. Next to "Icy Chain", Saweetie contributed to the soundtrack for Bruised (2021), released the same day, with the track "Attitude". The "Icy Chain" release was accompanied by a visualizer, where diamonds descend from the air beside a rotating snowflake.

=== Music video ===
A music video for "Icy Chain" was filmed, and scheduled to be published with Saweetie's extended play Icy Season, but neither has come to fruition. Saweetie canceled the extended play to focus on finishing Pretty Bitch Music.

== Composition ==
"Icy Chain" is one minute and 50 seconds long. The song's production was described as "absurdly bouncy" and contains a melodic bassline. The chorus contains a chant described by Paul Duong as "infectious". "Icy Chain" features Saweetie's "confident" rapping, and contains a reference to the organization People for the Ethical Treatment of Animals (PETA). Saweetie raps that she has fur on her body, and addresses PETA by noting that she's "being 100" (being truthful). PETA responded to this by sending Saweetie a faux-fur jacket.

=== Production ===
Lil Aaron, Rocco Did It Again, and Dr. Luke produced "Icy Chain". Dr. Luke was previously credited as a producer on the Saweetie singles "Tap In" and "Best Friend".

== Live performances ==
On November 20, Saweetie performed a medley composed of "Icy Chain", "Tap In", and "Best Friend" on Saturday Night Live, which was hosted by actor Simu Liu that day. In the performance, Saweetie performed choreography largely composed of twerking next to two of her dancers, in front of three light-up letters which spell "icy". She wore a white skirt for the medley. Saweetie again performed "Icy Chain" at the iHeart Radio Jingle Ball event in New York. The performance was ridiculed on social media, with users directing criticism at Saweetie's dancing. In response to the performance's criticism, Saweetie posted the choreography of her performance to social media and began a dance challenge, dubbed by the rapper as the "#IcyChainChallenge".

== Credits ==
Credits adapted from Spotify.

- Saweetie – performer, songwriter
- Dr. Luke – producer, songwriter
- Lil Aaron – producer, songwriter
- Rocco Did It Again! – producer, songwriter
- Randall Hammers – songwriter

== Charts ==
Chart performance for "Icy Chain"
Chart (2021)	Peak position
US Rhythmic (Billboard)	34
