= Too Many =

Too Many may refer to:

- "Too Many" (Wuda & King Dyl song)
- "Too Many" (Saweetie song)
- "Too Many" (Juicy J song)
