= Handstand (song) =

2021 single by French Montana and Doja Cat featuring Saweetie

Single by French Montana and Doja Cat featuring Saweetie

from the album They Got Amnesia
- Released: November 23, 2021
- Length: 2:50
- Label: Bad Boy; Epic
- Songwriters: Karim Kharbouch; Amala Dlamini; Diamonté Harper; Christopher Rios; Julian Garfield; Richard Frierson; Christian Ward; Darryl Clemons; Kevin Price; Jaucquez Lowe
- Producers: Hitmaka; Pooh Beatz; Go Grizzly; London Jae

French Montana singles chronology
"Panicking" (2021)	"Handstand" (2021)	"Maquine De Dinero" (2022)

Doja Cat singles chronology
"Woman" (2021)	"Handstand" (2021)	"Freaky Deaky" (2022)

Saweetie singles chronology
"Icy Chain" (2021)	"Handstand" (2021)	"Closer" (2022)

Music video
- "Handstand" on YouTube

"Handstand" is a song by Moroccan-American rapper French Montana and American rapper and singer Doja Cat featuring fellow American rapper Saweetie. It was released as fourth single from his fourth studio album They Got Amnesia on November 23, 2021, four days after the album's release. It was written by the rappers, Darryl Clemons, Kevin Price, Jaucquez Lowe, and Hitmaka, the latter producing alongside Pooh Beatz, Go Grizzly, and London Jae. The song interpolates Cash Money's 2000 single Project Chick and Big Pun's 2000 single "It's So Hard". It received favorable reviews from the music critics, who deemed the track as suitable for dancing.

The music video, directed by Edgar Esteves and Jon Primo, premiered on French Montana's YouTube channel on December 8, 2021. It features the performers in a post-apocalyptic setting fighting armed groups of people. The visual received many comparisons to movies. The song peaked in the Top 40 of the American R&B/Hip-Hop Airplay and Rhythmic charts.

== Composition and critical reception ==
"Handstand" is two minutes and fifty seconds long. It contains an interpolation of Big Pun's 2000 single "It's So Hard", which itself is based around a sample of Danny Rivera's "En un rincón del alma", thereby giving Big Pun, Julian Garfield, and Younglord songwriting credit. The song begins with a hook, with vocals from all of the performers. French Montana then provides the first verse. Rap-Up suggested that one line of the song was inspired by "Project B!#$h" from the soundtrack of the 2000 drama film Baller Blockin', performed by Cash Money Millionaires members Big Tymers, Lil Wayne and Juvenile.

Wongo Okon from Uproxx described "Handstand" as a "bright" moment in They Got Amnesia and as a "bouncy" effort in which the rappers showcase their sexual prowess. The Source's Shawn Grant called it a "twerkable chant over sleek music". Writing for HipHopDX, Vivian Medithi opined that the track is a "ready-made club jam for the ladies that seems destined for TikTok success". She also complimented Doja Cat's contribution, saying that she "sound[s] perfectly at home". Regina Cho of Revolt dubbed it as the album's "stand-out" song, similarly to Grant who said that it is amongst the "best" tracks on They Got Amnesia.

== Release and commercial performance ==
On November 8, 2021, French Montana shared the track listing for his fourth studio album They Got Amnesia, unveiling "Handstand" as its eighth track. The album was initially scheduled to be released on November 12, but was postponed for a week. The "Handstand" music video was not finished at this time. On November 16, French Montana previewed a snippet of Doja Cat's verse of "Handstand" on Instagram.

The song was released as the fourth single to promote the project. Bad Boy Records and Epic Records issued the song to American rhythmic contemporary radio on November 23, 2021. On December 17, Sony Music sent the track to Italian radio airplay.

During the debut radio week, "Handstand" became the most added song to urban contemporary panels, and second most added on rhythmic format. It also generated over seven million streams throughout first three weeks of its release. The single peaked at number 33 on the American R&B/Hip-Hop Airplay chart becoming French Montana's 17th, and Doja Cat's sixth, Top 40 entry on the chart. On the Rhythmic ranking, it was placed at number 21, being French Montana's 26th, Doja Cat's 12th, and Saweetie's eighth entry to the chart. In New Zealand, it entered the Hot Singles chart at number 40.

== Music video ==
French Montana (right) and Doja Cat (left) in the music video. The latter is wearing machine gun bikini, which reminded Rolling Stone writer Brenna Ehrlich of the 1968 film Barbarella.

The music video for "Handstand" was directed by Edgar Esteves and Jon Primo. On November 11, French Montana posted a video with Doja Cat from the set of the music video. The clip premiered on the rapper's YouTube channel on December 8, 2021. It was sponsored by Russian vodka brand Beluga and mobile shopping app NTWRK.

The video is set in a post-apocalyptic world, where the rappers are fighting armed people on the street. They use baseball bats and laser eyes, and Doja Cat wears a machine-gun bikini. During Saweetie's verse, she twerks over the burning city, and the cyborgs fight back against the protestors. The clip ends with French Montana showing off a non-fungible token (NFT). The visual was compared to films by many critics, including to The Warriors (1979), The Terminator (1984) and Barbarella (1968), by Rolling Stone's Brenna Ehrlich, to Waterworld (1995) by Vulture's Bethy Squires, to Planet Terror (2007) by Okon, and to the Mad Max series by both Okon and Rap-Up. Bethy Squires from Vulture wrote that "other iconic hip-hop videos have placed themselves in a Thunderdome-like future, (...) but none of these videos, stunning though they are, had the boldness of vision to imagine a world where the only connection to the civilization we once knew is sponcon."

== Credits ==
These credits have been adapted from Tidal.

- French Montana – lead artist, rap, songwriting
- Doja Cat – lead artist, rap, songwriting
- Saweetie – featured artist, rap, songwriting
- Big Pun – songwriting
- Julian Garfield – songwriting
- Younglord – songwriting
- Hitmaka – songwriting, production
- Darryl Clemons – songwriting
- Kevin Price – songwriting
- Jaucquez Lowe – songwriting
- Pooh Beatz – production
- Go Grizzly – production
- London Jae – production
- MIXX – engineering
- Mike Dean – mixing, mastering

== Charts ==
Chart performance for "Handstand"
Chart (2021–2022)	Peak position
New Zealand Hot Singles (RMNZ)	40
US R&B/Hip-Hop Airplay (Billboard)	33
US Rhythmic Airplay (Billboard)	21
