= Beluga =

Beluga may refer to:

== Animals ==
- Beluga (sturgeon)
- Beluga whale

== Food and drink ==
- Beluga caviar, roe of the beluga sturgeon
- Beluga (vodka), a vodka brand
- Beluga, a type of lentil

== Places ==
- Beluga, Alaska, a census-designated place
- Beluga or Belukha Mountain, Altai Mountains, Russia

== Transportation ==
- Airbus Beluga, a large transport airplane
- Airbus BelugaXL, a larger transport airplane
- Beluga Airport, a privately owned airport in Beluga, Alaska

== Other uses ==
- Beluga (restaurant), Maastricht, Netherlands
- Beluga Shipping, a German former company
- Beluga-class submarine, a class of one Russian experimental submarine
- USS Beluga, a United States Navy patrol boat
- Beluga J. Heard, a character in the Japanese manga Black Cat
- "Beluga", a track on the 2021 studio album Untourable Album by Men I Trust

== See also ==
- Baby Beluga, a 1980 album by Raffi
- Beluga School for Life, a Thai educational non-profit organization
