= Snooze (SZA song) =

Single by SZA

from the album SOS
- Written: 2021
- Released: April 25, 2023
- Recorded: 2021
- Genre: R&B
- Length: 3:21
- Label: Top Dawg; RCA
- Songwriters: Solána Rowe; Kenny B. Edmonds; Khris Riddick-Tynes; Leon Thomas; Blair Ferguson
- Producers: Babyface; The Rascals; BLK

SZA singles chronology
"Special" (remix) (2023)	"Snooze" (2023)	"Slime You Out" (2023)

Music video
- "Snooze" on YouTube

Acoustic version cover

Justin Bieber singles chronology
"Private Landing" (2023)	"Snooze" (acoustic) (2023)	"Daisies" (2025)

Audio video
- "Snooze" (acoustic) on YouTube

"Snooze" is a song by American singer-songwriter SZA, and the sixth single from her second studio album, SOS (2022). It is an R&B song with a midtempo rhythm, featuring an instrumental that consists of bass, guitars, drums, and synthesizers. The main vocals are complemented by several layers of harmonies beneath, and a riff appears at the song's beginning. The lyrics are about SZA's obsessive devotion to a love interest who does not reciprocate her intense feelings of yearning, despite her willingness to prove her love with violence. "Snooze" was sent to radio on April 25, 2023, and a four-track single was released on digital streaming platforms on August 25. An acoustic version featuring Justin Bieber followed on September 15.

"Snooze" was critically and commercially successful. Critics praised the song for its composition, calling it dreamy, relaxing, and timeless. It won accolades for R&B categories at the MTV Video Music Awards and the Grammy Awards. It was also ranked by Rolling Stone in 2025 as the 13th-best song of the 21st century. "Snooze" debuted at number 29 on the US Billboard Hot 100 in December 2022, and it was a sleeper hit, charting as a non-single for months before its release to radio. It peaked at number two on the Hot 100, spent 70 weeks there in total, and was the only song to chart for all of 2023. "Snooze" was the 17th best-selling single of 2023 worldwide. It has been certified 11× platinum by the Recording Industry Association of America.

A music video for "Snooze", directed by SZA alongside Bradley J. Calder, premiered on YouTube on August 25. It features cameos from four celebrities, one of them being Bieber, who play SZA's love interests. They can be seen with SZA in a multitude of romantic interactions, where their relationships eventually deteriorate and end. The video concludes with a snippet of the song "Diamond Boy (DTM)" from SOS's reissue, Lana, a promotion strategy she had consistently been doing to tease new music. Outside the music video, SZA performed "Snooze" during the SOS Tour (2023–2024) and an assortment of music festivals like Glastonbury 2024. Multiple musicians, including Bieber, have done covers of the song.

== Background ==
In 2017, SZA released her commercially successful and well-acclaimed debut studio album, Ctrl. Critics throughout the years have credited it for being innovative within the R&B genre and establishing her as a major figure in contemporary pop and R&B music. (Note: Cited to The Line of Best Fit, NME, The Daily Telegraph, The New Yorker, and Consequence) SZA spoke in Ctrl variously about romance, desire, and self-esteem, as well as the many ways in which emotions like jealousy and intense desire can destroy them.

The next album after Ctrl was SOS. Disappointed that she had become frequently categorized as an R&B musician, which she felt was due to her being a Black woman. SZA opted to incorporate several genres and musical styles on SOS, while still she still retaining her already established sound. Rowe declaring before the album's release that she "love[d] making Black music, period". SZA said that she was fine with making R&B songs yet wanted space to diversify her work. Certain tracks on SOS have an aura SZA described as "aggressive", while others, like "Snooze", were softer and slower.

== Composition ==
"Snooze"
"Snooze" is an R&B song featuring guitars, bass, twinkly synthesizers, and drums. Shown in the sample is the intro, where SZA does a vocal riff and some ad libs. The song's overall sound has been frequently described by critics as dreamy, relaxing, or intoxicating.

"Snooze" is an R&B song set to a midtempo pace. Its instrumental consists of drums and twinkling synthesizers, combined with bass and guitars to build the chords and rhythm. SZA's main vocals are accompanied by layered harmonies and several ad libs, and a vocal riff at the start of the song.

Critics have frequently described the song's sound as "dreamy". Writing for Billboard, Andrew Unterberger said that the composition felt like "being in bed with someone you love and deciding you just have to have another 15 minutes there". Julianne Escobedo Shepherd of Pitchfork wrote that "Snooze" is heavily influenced by "classic" R&B songs from the past, citing how the song ends via a fade-out as a demonstrative example.

== Production ==
The first "Snooze" demo came from producer Blair Ferguson (BLK) in late 2021, while he was staying the winter in Glasgow at his aunt's attic. Before it became a part of SOS's tracklist, the song was a planned duet by SZA and Babyface for the latter's ninth studio album, Girls Night Out (2022). BLK, in his words, took a "traditional R&B route" for the demo, infusing it with "the dreamy and smooth aspects of [SZA's] sound". "Snooze" was one of two songs that SZA and Babyface finished during their 2021 recording sessions.

Upon finishing the demo, BLK sent his work to Leon Thomas III, member of the production duo the Rascals. Once he was informed about the duet alongside his co-producer Khris Riddick-Tynes, Thomas flew from Atlanta to Babyface's Los Angeles studio, working on the drums en route. He met the others at the studio the next day. With BLK's demo as their reference, the producers, as Thomas recalls, "[built] the whole thing from scratch". The turnaround time for their song was short.

During the session, SZA entered the recording room intending to finish another track. Noticing the producers were rehearsing one of their beats, she heard Thomas use his voice as a sample on a "Snooze" instrumental. He had done a vocal chop, which he made by slowly singing the melody in a different key, then increasing the tempo. Meanwhile, Babyface was playing various instruments like guitars to build the song's melody. Impressed, SZA began writing the lyrics, finished within 20–30 minutes, and recorded her vocals in the same day. They put Thomas' pitch-shifted vocals near the end of the song, specifically the bridge.

== Lyrics ==
According to SZA, the making of SOS involved several "palate cleanser" sessions, in which she would quickly write tracks like "Snooze" within an hour to refresh her mind in preparation for her more demanding projects. What resulted from her "Snooze" session was a love song about an obsessive, passionate romance. Romance is a frequent subject across SOS's tracks, and SZA often discusses it with an idealized, melancholic, or vicious tone. Aside from love, other topics and themes that the album covers include hate, self-worth, and revenge. In 2022, SZA told Glamour that SOS would explore the feelings of heartbreak and "being pissed": "This is my villain era, and I'm very comfortable with that. It is in the way I say no [...] It's in the fucked up things that I don't apologize for."

In "Snooze", SZA sings that her dedication to the song's subject is so great that she will go to risky extremes to prove her love. Lyrics from the opening ("I'll touch that fire for you, I do that three, four times again, I testify for you / I told that lie, I'd kill that bitch / I do what all of them around you scared to do, I'm not.") speak about her loyalty, characterized by dependency and possessiveness. Giving her lover her undivided attention, she urges them to reciprocate and think about her even in their dreams. Lyrics from the chorus ("I can't lose when I'm with you / How can I snooze and miss the moment?") indicate that SZA cannot fathom a life without their romantic relationship and will take every possible chance to be with them.

Dispersed throughout SOS are pop culture references to several films, with tracks named after Kill Bill (2003) and Gone Girl (2014) as well as mentions of characters from the Star Wars and Despicable Me franchises. "Snooze" in particular references the crime drama film Scarface (1983) and the character Elvira Hancock, who marries the criminal protagonist and is portrayed with a bob haircut. The relevant lyrics read: "In a drop-top ride with you, I feel like Scarface (Scarface) / Like that white bitch with the bob, I'll be your main one", implying that SZA wants to be partners in crime, or extremely close, with her lover.

Then, her degree of yearning is revealed to be one-sided, much to her dismay. "Snooze" demonstrates, as Larisha Paul writes for Rolling Stone, that "in both lust and love", vulnerability in SZA's music "prevails with limitless devotion." Despite promising to kill, steal, or start a fire for her lover, SZA feels as though they are failing to return the same amount of attention and effort to make their romance work. The bridge shows how the argument between them takes place: ("How you frontin' on me and I'm the main one tryin'? / How you blame it on me and you the main one lyin'? How you threatenin' to leave and I'm the main one cryin'?")

== Release ==
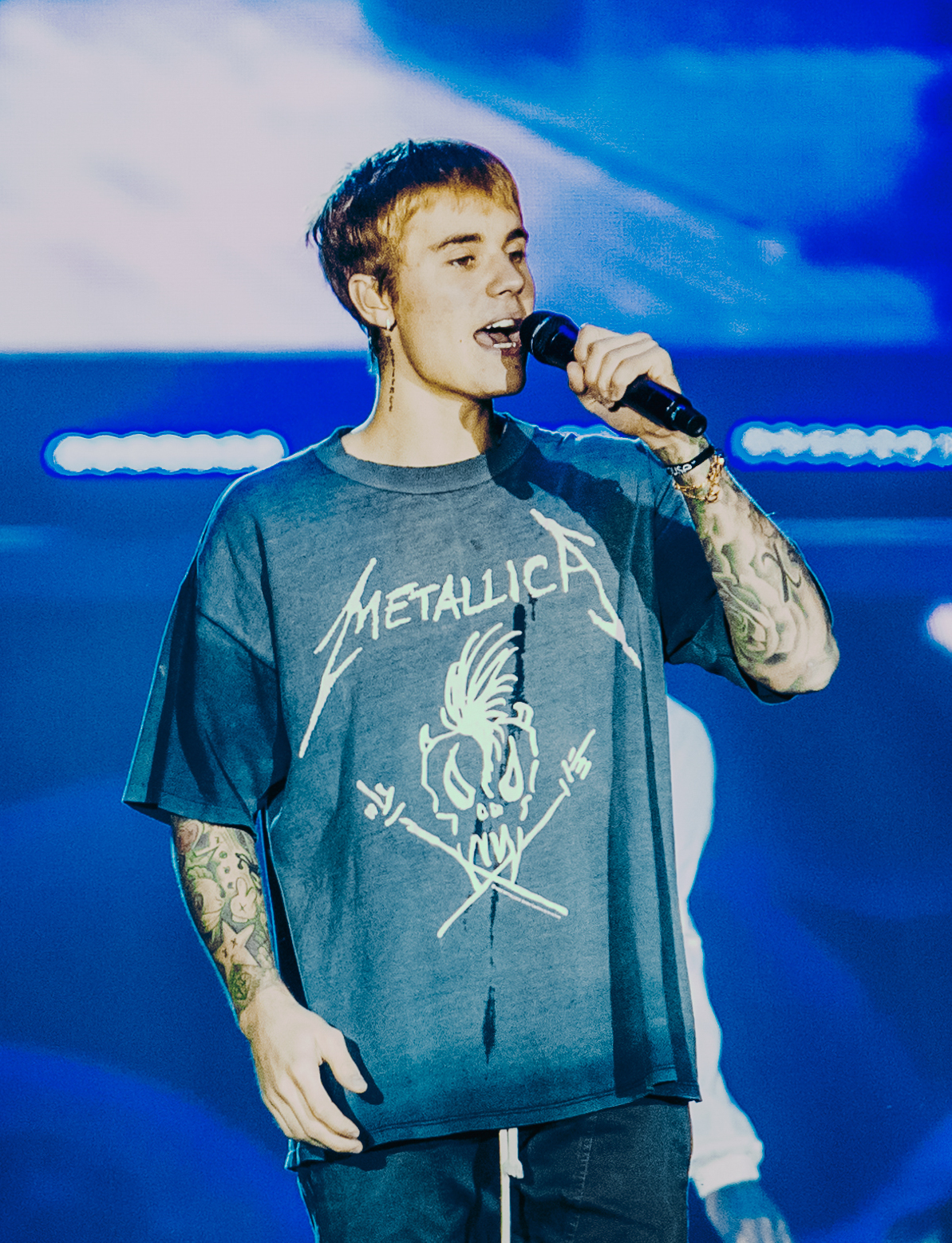
Justin Bieber features on an acoustic remix of "Snooze", released a month after he appeared in the song's music video.

In November 2022, SZA announced the release date of SOS, alongside its title, via an interview with Billboard. The album was released on December 9, through Top Dawg Entertainment and RCA Records. Its tracklist consists of 23 songs, with "Snooze" placed at number eight.

Over time, "Snooze" received a steady surge of streams due to its going viral on the video-sharing application TikTok. In response, Top Dawg and RCA sent the song to rhythmic and R&B/hip-hop radio on April 25, 2023, as the album's sixth single. A four-track bundle of "Snooze", which includes sped-up and instrumental versions, was released on digital streaming platforms on August 25, the same day as its music video's premiere.

Canadian singer Justin Bieber, who made a cameo in the music video, features on an acoustic remix of the song. The remix was released on September 15, via digital streaming platforms. Although there is no new verse, Bieber provides background vocals and replaces SZA as the second verse's main vocalist.

== Critical reception ==
"Snooze" has received critical acclaim. The instrumental was a recurring subject of attention; Billboard's Andrew Unterberger and Rolling Stone's Larisha Paul said it was "intoxicating", and several others wrote positively about the "dreamy" sound. Shanté Collier-McDermott of Clash said that the drum rhythm, vocal melodies, and honest songwriting created a highly relaxing aural experience that she likened to a soft and warm blanket. Also invoking imagery of a comfortable rest, Regina Cho of Vibe wrote that "Snooze" could make one "want to gaze up to the sky and fall into the sweetest daydream." She added that "the punch of the potent lyrics bring [one] back to reality."

In the context of "Snooze"'s appearance on SOS, critics focused on both the lyrics and music. A few of them considered it an album standout. The catchiness and composition were points of praise for News24's Joel Ontong, who recommended listeners play the song on repeat and said that its instrumental was the album's best. Essence's Okla Jones thought the lyrics exemplified SZA's distinctive approach on female sexuality which, according to Jones, elevated SZA from her peers. Other critics judged the song based on how it contributed to the album's cohesion. Slant Magazine's Paul Attard wrote positively, saying that its R&B composition did not clash with the other tracks' sounds, although Gigwise's Millie O'Brien thought that "Snooze" marked the beginning of SOS's "forgettable" middle part.

Speaking about its long-term impact, critics believe that "Snooze" will become a timeless classic. In 2025, Rolling Stone ranked "Snooze" at number 13 in the 2025 edition of their "Greatest Songs of the 21st Century" list. In the entry description, Mankaprr Conteh wrote the following: "People like to compliment records as timeless, but this one shines precisely because it boasts such a contemporary take on the age-old drama of a relationship going wrong — matched with a feeling so right."

== Commercial performance ==
In the US, "Snooze" debuted on the Billboard Hot 100 at number 29 as a non-single track on December 24, 2022. Due to consistent streaming numbers, it slowly climbed the chart and reached the top 10 eight months later, in August 2023. With a chart run of 70 weeks, "Snooze" was the only song to appear on every Billboard Hot 100 issue in 2023. It peaked at number two there, as well as on Hot R&B/Hip-Hop Songs. Among airplay charts, "Snooze" peaked atop the all-genre Radio Songs, and it spent 37 weeks at number one on R&B/Hip-Hop Airplay. In doing so, it broke the record set by Chris Brown and Young Thug's "Go Crazy" (2020) for the longest time at the top.

On the Billboard Global 200, which tracks worldwide streams and downloads for songs, "Snooze" peaked at number 6. It was propelled from its number-42 position from the previous chart issue by the acoustic remixes release. Outside the US, "Snooze" reached the top 20 in numerous countries like the Philippines (2), Suriname (9), Singapore (10), Canada (11), South Africa (12), the UAE (18), and the UK (18). In Australia, the song debuted at number 50 and slowly rose to its peak of number 21, staying there for two weeks. "Snooze" had a chart run of 73 weeks in New Zealand, where it debuted at number 27 and reached number 5 after 33 weeks. The acoustic version peaked at number 6 on the country's Hot Singles chart for trending songs; it also reached the top 50 in Sweden.

"Snooze" was the 17th-best-selling single of 2023. According to the International Federation of the Phonographic Industry, it had sold over 1.06 billion units, consisting of streams and digital sales, worldwide. Countries where "Snooze" placed on their corresponding year-end charts include the Philippines (5), the US (9), New Zealand (14), Australia, and Canada (43). Multi-platinum certifications have been issued for the song in Australia, Brazil, Canada, New Zealand, and the US. In the US, the song has been certified 11× platinum by the Recording Industry Association of America.

Because of "Snooze"'s slow-burn success, some publications have called it a sleeper hit. In a Billboard roundtable discussion, staffer Heran Mamo told the others that by the month of September 2023, "nobody [could] sleep on that song anymore." In another roundtable by the magazine, some said that despite failing to reach number one, "Snooze" arguably overshadowed the chart-topping "Kill Bill" as SOS's most popular single because of its longevity. They added that, for this same reason, "Snooze" would become SZA's career-defining song.

== Music video ==
To tease the music video for "Snooze", SZA posted two behind-the-scenes footage on Instagram on August 12, 2023. Each clip was set to unreleased music.

The music video premiered on YouTube on August 25, 2023, and was directed by Bradley J. Calder and SZA. According to her, most of what was in the video was entirely improvised, save for a dance scene involving a robot. One of their spontaneous decisions was including Bieber, which happened because he coincidentally was on location during the day of filming. Aside from Bieber, the list of cameos consists of SOS co-producer Benny Blanco and actors Young Mazino and Woody McClain; all four of them play as SZA's love interests. Dazed's Elliot Hoste ranked the music video as the fourth-best one for 2023.

The video begins with multiple romantic scenes, each featuring SZA with one of the four suitors. She can be seen with Mazino in a farm, where they feed a horse and ride a quad bike; McClain in a gym, where she strips and performs a sultry dance for him; Bieber in a bedroom, where they smoke cannabis after a picnic outdoors; and Blanco on the lawn, where he eats fries with ketchup from atop SZA's buttocks. As the video progresses, her relationships with them deteriorate, a result of the men's failure to give SZA enough attention. After finding herself in a series of arguments with them, she ends her romances with all four of the suitors. Near the end, she settles for a robot on a couch wearing a baseball cap, giving it a lap dance and being accompanied by two backup dancers.

Concluding the video is a snippet of "Diamond Boy (DTM)", a track from SOS's reissue titled Lana. The outro's format is consistent with SZA's promotion strategy of previewing future music at the end of her music videos. The short "DTM (Diamond Boy)" preview accompanies various scenes of SZA and an unknown lover, who both run towards each other in a large meadow and share an embrace. Afterward, the outro cuts to several shots of her near a white Ferrari car as the sun sets. Walking in a forest somewhere in Cologne, Germany, SZA strips to G-string underwear as she is followed by a night-vision camera.

Due to the vulgarity and sexual scenes in the video, the video was broadcast after 10 p.m. in France and some scenes was blurred.

== Live performances and covers ==
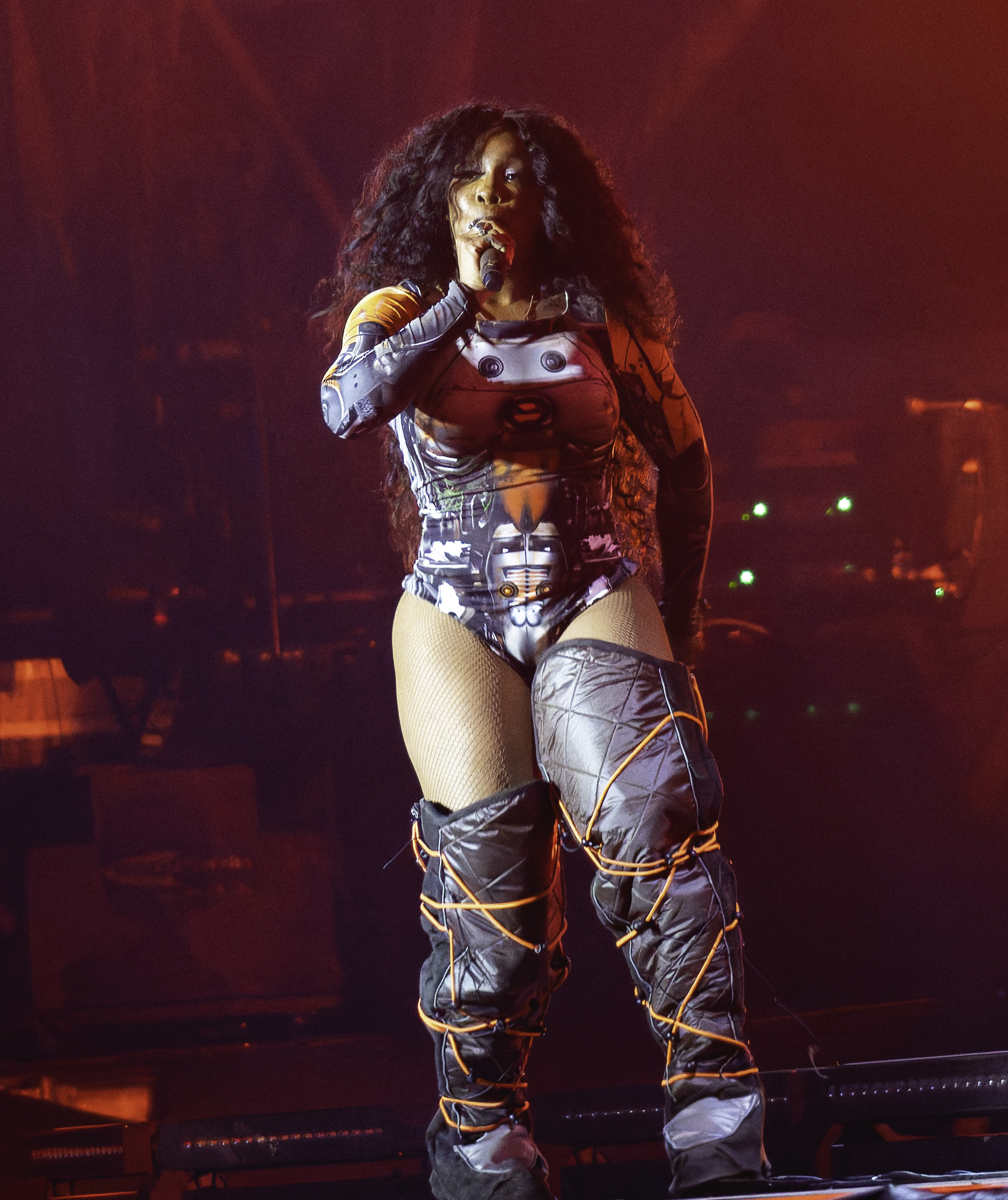
The "robot world" section of SZA's Glastonbury 2024 set, where she performed "Snooze"

SZA debuted "Snooze" as part of the regular set list of the SOS Tour, an international tour in support of SOS that ran from 2023 to 2024. Throughout 2024, she performed the song in a lengthy series of music festivals, including BST Hyde Park, Glastonbury, Lollapalooza, and Osheaga. During that year's Grammy Awards, SZA used "Snooze" for the first half of a medley with "Kill Bill", wearing a trenchcoat and singing on a stage that depicted a burning alleyway. The 2023 MTV Video Music Awards ceremony could have included a performance of "Snooze" as well, but it was canceled at the behest of SZA's manager Punch, who was unhappy she was not nominated for Artist of the Year. Elsewhere, she performed the song during her co-headlining Grand National Tour (2025) with rapper Kendrick Lamar.

"Snooze" has been covered by multiple artists, including Bieber and Thomas. Thomas's version was uploaded to YouTube in late January 2023, and Bieber performed his at a surprise Toronto concert during the NHL All-Star Player Draft on February 1, 2024. Other covers include one from Terrace Martin, who did an instrumental-only rendition on the saxophone; it was later featured on his 11th studio album, Fine Tune (2023). When John Legend attended an online influencer's birthday party in November, he was asked to sing "Snooze" impromptu, to which he agreed and performed for the guests with a piano. Non-Western acts who covered the song include Stacey and Mikha of the Filipina girl group Bini.

== Accolades ==
List of awards and nominations received by "Snooze"
Year	Award	Category	Result	Ref.
2023	Billboard Music Awards	Top R&B Song	Nominated	
2023	Soul Train Music Awards	Song of the Year	Won	
2023	Soul Train Music Awards	The Ashford & Simpson Songwriter's Award	Won	
2023	Soul Train Music Awards	Best Dance Performance	Nominated	
2024	Grammy Awards	Best R&B Song	Won	
2024	iHeartRadio Music Awards	R&B Song of the Year	Won	
2024	MTV Video Music Awards	Video of the Year	Nominated	
2024	MTV Video Music Awards	Best R&B	Won	
2024	BMI Pop Awards	Most Performed Songs of the Year	Won	
2024	BMI R&B/Hip-Hop Awards	Most Performed Songs of the Year	Won	
2024	ASCAP Rhythm & Soul Music Awards	R&B/Hip-Hop and Rap Song of the Year	Won	

== Credits ==
Credits are adapted from the liner notes of SOS.

Recording and management

- Engineered at Westlake Barn and Studios A and D (Los Angeles, California)
- Mixed at Ponzu Studios (Los Angeles)
- Mastered at Becker Mastering (Pasadena, California)

Personnel

- Solána Rowe (SZA) – vocals, songwriting
- Kenny B. Edmonds (Babyface) – songwriting, production
- Khris Riddick-Tynes – songwriting, production
- Leon Thomas – songwriting, production
- Blair Ferguson (BLK) – songwriting, production
- Rob Bisel – vocal production, engineering, mixing
- Jonathan Lopez – assistant engineering
- Syd Tagle – assistant engineering
- Dale Becker – mastering
- Katie Harvey – assistant mastering
- Noah McCorkle – assistant mastering

== Charts ==
=== Weekly charts ===
Weekly chart performance for "Snooze"
Chart (2022–2026)	Peak position
Australia (ARIA)	21
Australia Hip Hop/R&B (ARIA)	6
Canada Hot 100 (Billboard)	11
Canada CHR/Top 40 (Billboard)	7
Global 200 (Billboard)	6
Ireland (IRMA)	29
Japan Download Songs (Billboard Japan)	51
Malaysia (Billboard)	7
Malaysia International (RIM)	4
Netherlands (Global Top 40)	27
Netherlands (Single Top 100)	52
New Zealand (Recorded Music NZ)	5
Philippines (Billboard)	2
Portugal (AFP)	76
Singapore (RIAS)	10
South Africa Streaming (TOSAC)	39
Suriname (Nationale Top 40)	9
Switzerland (Schweizer Hitparade)	53
UAE (IFPI)	18
UK Singles (Official Charts)	18
UK Hip Hop/R&B (Official Charts)	6
US Billboard Hot 100	2
US Adult Pop Airplay (Billboard)	32
US Dance Airplay (Billboard)	27
US Hot R&B/Hip-Hop Songs (Billboard)	2
US Pop Airplay (Billboard)	2
US R&B/Hip-Hop Airplay (Billboard)	1
US Rhythmic Airplay (Billboard)	1
Vietnam (Vietnam Hot 100)	89

Chart performance for "Snooze" (acoustic)
Chart (2023)	Peak position
New Zealand Hot Singles (RMNZ)	6
Sweden (Sverigetopplistan)	49

=== Year-end charts ===
2023 year-end chart performance for "Snooze"
Chart (2023)	Position
Australia (ARIA)	43
Canada (Canadian Hot 100)	43
Global 200 (Billboard)	31
Global Singles (IFPI)	17
New Zealand (Recorded Music NZ)	14
Philippines (Philippines Hot 100)	5
UK Singles (OCC)	92
US Billboard Hot 100	9
US Hot R&B/Hip-Hop Songs (Billboard)	4
US Mainstream Top 40 (Billboard)	14
US Rhythmic (Billboard)	4
US R&B/Hip-Hop Airplay (Billboard)	3

2024 year-end chart performance for "Snooze"
Chart (2024)	Position
Australia (ARIA)	47
Australia Hip Hop/R&B (ARIA)	7
Canada (Canadian Hot 100)	58
Global 200 (Billboard)	25
New Zealand (Recorded Music NZ)	23
Philippines (Philippines Hot 100)	22
Portugal (AFP)	197
US Billboard Hot 100	20
US Hot R&B/Hip-Hop Songs (Billboard)	6
US R&B/Hip-Hop Airplay (Billboard)	1
US Mainstream Top 40 (Billboard)	43
US Rhythmic (Billboard)	42

2025 year-end chart performance for "Snooze"
Chart (2025)	Position
Global 200 (Billboard)	53
Philippines (Philippines Hot 100)	30

== Certifications ==
Certifications for "Snooze"
Region	Certification	Certified units/sales
Australia (ARIA)	4× Platinum	280,000^{‡}
Brazil (Pro-Música Brasil)	3× Platinum	120,000^{‡}
Canada (Music Canada)	7× Platinum	560,000^{‡}
Denmark (IFPI Danmark)	Platinum	90,000^{‡}
France (SNEP)	Platinum	200,000^{‡}
New Zealand (RMNZ)	6× Platinum	180,000^{‡}
Poland (ZPAV)	Gold	25,000^{‡}
Portugal (AFP)	2× Platinum	20,000^{‡}
Spain (Promusicae)	Gold	30,000^{‡}
Switzerland (IFPI Switzerland)	Gold	10,000^{‡}
United Kingdom (BPI)	2× Platinum	1,200,000^{‡}
United States (RIAA)	11× Platinum	11,000,000^{‡}
Streaming
Sweden (GLF) Acoustic version	Gold	4,000,000^{†}
Worldwide (IFPI)	—	1,060,000,000
^{‡} Sales+streaming figures based on certification alone.^{†} Streaming-only figures based on certification alone.

== Release history ==
Release history for "Snooze"
Region	Date	Format	Version	Label	Ref.
United States	April 25, 2023	Rhythmic contemporary	Original	Top Dawg; RCA	
United States	April 25, 2023	Urban contemporary radio	Original	Top Dawg; RCA	
United States	May 9, 2023	Contemporary hit radio	Original	Top Dawg; RCA	
Various	August 25, 2023	Digital download; streaming	Original	Top Dawg; RCA	
Italy	September 8, 2023	Radio airplay	Original	Sony	
Various	September 15, 2023	Digital download; streaming	Acoustic	Top Dawg; RCA	
Various	November 11, 2026	7-inch vinyl	Original · Acoustic	Top Dawg; RCA	

== See also ==
- List of Billboard Global 200 top-ten singles in 2023
- List of Billboard Hot 100 top-ten singles in 2023
- List of Billboard Hot 100 top-ten singles in 2024
- List of number-one R&B/hip-hop songs of 2023 (U.S.)
- List of Billboard Hot R&B/Hip-Hop Songs number ones of 2024
- List of Billboard Rhythmic number-one songs of the 2020s
- List of Radio Songs number ones of the 2020s
