= They Got Amnesia =

Studio album by French Montana
- Released: November 19, 2021
- Genre: Hip hop
- Length: 60:10
- Labels: Coke Boys; Bad Boy; Epic
- Producers: 12Keyz; Armotunez; Aye YB; Boi-1da; BoogzDaBeast; Bordeaux; Butterbeats; Cardiak; Diddy; Elemantastic; French Montana; FnZ; Go Grizzly; Harry Fraud; Hitmaka; Keith-FF; Kronic; LayZbeats; Lil CC; London Jae; Mixx; Nik Dean; Non Native; Paul Cabbin; Pooh Beatz; Reefa; Rich Steele; Slimwave; SMPLGTWY; Stoopidondabeat; Tay Keith; Tee Romano

French Montana chronology
CB5 (2020)	They Got Amnesia (2021)	Montega (2022)

Singles from They Got Amnesia
- 1. "FWMGAB" Released: June 11, 2021; 2. "I Don't Really Care" Released: October 29, 2021; 3. "Panicking" Released: November 5, 2021; 4. "Handstand" Released: November 23, 2021

They Got Amnesia is the fourth studio album by Moroccan-American rapper French Montana. It was released through Epic Records on November 19, 2021. The album features guest appearances from John Legend, Rick Ross, Kodak Black, the late Pop Smoke, Lil Durk, Doja Cat, Saweetie, Fivio Foreign, Fabolous, Coi Leray, 42 Dugg, Ty Dolla Sign, Latto, Lil Tjay, and Moneybagg Yo.

The album was updated on November 23, 2021. It features an additional guest appearance from Tory Lanez. Production was handled by Montana himself alongside Diddy, Hitmaka, Cardiak, FnZ, BoogzDaBeast, Butterbeats, Stoopidondabeat, Boi-1da, SMPLGTWY, Elemantastic, Lil CC, Paul Cabbin, Tee Romano, Pooh Beatz, Go Grizzly, London Jae, Reefa, Bordeaux, Non Native, Nik Dean, 12Keyz, Mixx, Harry Fraud, Aye YB, Kronic, Tay Keith, Keith-FF, Rich Steele, Slimwave, LayZbeats, and Armotunez. The project debuted and peaked at number 59 on the Billboard 200 for the chart week ending December 4, 2021.

== Background and promotion ==
On November 1, 2021, French Montana announced the album alongside its title, cover art, and now-original release date. The album was supposed to be released on November 12, 2021, but was pushed by exactly one week for unknown reasons. The cover art of the project is inspired by the time when he was rushed to the hospital in November 2019 due to heart issues and nausea. Montana wrote, "grateful to be here to tell [his] story" and "2 years ago this same day, [he] was in [the] ICU fighting for [his] life. Loss of memory lost friends lost hope almost lost it all …. and when [he] was down [he] found out all [he] had was Allah… [Allah] picked [him] up and gave [him] a second chance …. while [he] was trying to bounce back they counted [him] out, and forgot everything [he] did". Exactly a week later, he revealed its tracklist. The track "Splash Brothers", which features Canadian rapper Drake, was originally supposed to appear on the album as the original fifth track before the tracklist got updated about a week later. The reason for the removal of the song was upon Drake's request prior to the album's release as he did not want to release or be featured on new music at the time due to the deaths from American rapper and singer Travis Scott's annual weekend Astroworld festival that occurred on November 5, 2021, in which Drake also performed at. However, Montana revealed that he plans to put the song on the upcoming deluxe edition of the album.

=== Singles ===
The album's lead single, "FMWGAB", was released on June 11, 2021, and a remix that features American rapper Moneybagg Yo also appears on the project. The second single, "I Don't Really Care", was released on October 29, 2021. The third single, "Panicking", a collaboration with American rapper Fivio Foreign, was released on November 5, 2021. The fourth and final single, "Handstand", a collaboration with American rapper and singer Doja Cat that features American rapper Saweetie, was sent to rhythmic contemporary radio on November 23, 2021.

== Critical reception ==
Professional ratings
Aggregate scores
Source	Rating
Metacritic	71/100
Review scores
Source	Rating
AllMusic	3/5 stars
Clash	7/10
HipHopDX	3.3/5
Rolling Stone	3.5/5 stars

They Got Amnesia received generally positive reviews from critics upon release. At Metacritic, which assigns a normalized rating out of 100 to reviews from mainstream publications, the album received an average score of 71, based on 4 reviews. Robin Murray of Clash praised Montana's openness on the record, calling the album "his most open and autobiographical statement". Murray spoke on the numerous collaborations, saying it is "a collaborative workout, one that places all-time greats against newgen artists", while lauding the "string of unforgettable highs". Ultimately, Murray believed the album "succeeds in its ability to balance punchy, straight-up rap with a tinge of the bittersweet", and gave the album a rating of 7 out of 10.

== Track listing ==
They Got Amnesia track listing
No.	Title	Writer(s)	Producer(s)	Length
1.	"ICU"	Karim Kharbouch; Sean Combs; Christopher Wallace; Steven A. Jordan; Don Deadric Robey	French Montana; Diddy	0:46
2.	"How You King?"	Kharbouch; Christian Ward; Carl McCormick; Michael Mule; Isaac De Boni; Jahmal Gwin; Roy C. Hammond; Robey; Astrid S	French Montana; Hitmaka; Cardiak; FnZ; BoogzDaBeast	3:35
3.	"FWMGAB"	Kharbouch; Antonio Jimeniz; Juan Peters; Turrell Sims; Omar Alfano	French Montana; Butterbeats; Stoopidondabeat	3:07
4.	"I Don't Really Care"	Kharbouch; Matthew Samuels; Michael Samuels, Jr.; Elman Jabrayilov; Cydney Dade	Boi-1da; SMPLGTWY; Elemantastic; Lil CC	2:40
5.	"Touch the Sky" (with John Legend and Rick Ross)	Kharbouch; John Stephens; William Roberts II; Ward; McCormick; Mule; De Boni; Paul Cabbin; Tee Romano	Hitmaka; Cardiak; FnZ; Cabbin; Romano	3:09
6.	"Mopstick" (with Kodak Black)	Kharbouch; Bill Kapri; Ma. Samuels; Mi. Samuels	Boi-1da; SMPLGTWY	3:36
7.	"Stuck in the Jungle" (with Pop Smoke and Lil Durk)	Kharbouch; Bashar Jackson; Durk Banks; Ward; Mohammad Shams	French Montana; Hitmaka	2:58
8.	"Handstand" (with Doja Cat featuring Saweetie)	Kharbouch; Amala Dlamini; Diamonté Harper; Christopher Rios; Julian Garfield; Richard Frierson; Ward; Darryl Clemons; Kevin Price; Jaucquez Lowe	Hitmaka; Pooh Beatz; Go Grizzly; London Jae	2:50
9.	"Panicking" (with Fivio Foreign)	Kharbouch; Maxie Ryles III; Sharif Slater; Brendan Walsh; Luis Campozano; Dejan Nikolic; Kibwe Luke	Reefa; Bordeaux; Non Native; Nik Dean; 12Keyz	2:45
10.	"Didn't Get Far" (featuring Fabolous)	Kharbouch; John Jackson; Marilyn McLeod; Pam Sawyer; Jocelyn Donald; Ward; McCormick	Hitmaka; Cardiak	3:34
11.	"The Paper"	Kharbouch; B. Jackson; Andre Loblack; Ebony Oshunrinde; Kirk Robinson; Baruch Nembhard	French Montana; Mixx	2:31
12.	"Tonight Only"	Kharbouch; Rory Quigley; Tom Eyen; Henry Kreiger	Harry Fraud	3:01
13.	"Business"	Kharbouch; Ward; Romano; Terrance Harrison; Gregory Stephen Perry; Angelo Bond; Ace Redd	Hitmaka; Romano	3:16
14.	"Push Start" (with Coi Leray featuring 42 Dugg)	Kharbouch; Brittany Collins; Dion Hayes; Ward; McCormick	Hitmaka; Cardiak	2:17
15.	"Striptease" (with Ty Dolla Sign and Latto)	Kharbouch; Tyrone Griffin, Jr.; Alyssa Stephens; Ward; Aye YB	Hitmaka; Aye YB	2:09
16.	"Bag Season" (with Lil Tjay)	Kharbouch; Tione Merritt; Michael Mayeda	Kronic	2:41
17.	"Fraud"	Kharbouch; Ward; Brytavious Chambers; Cabbin; Keith-FF; Redd	Hitmaka; Tay Keith; Paul Cabbin; Keith-FF	3:10
18.	"Prayer (Skit)"	Kharbouch	Rich Steele; Slimwave	1:01
19.	"Appreciate Everything"	Kharbouch; Nick Movshon; Leon Michels; Nicole Wray; Vincent D'Annuzio; Jeffrey Silverman; Gstettenbauer Chanelle; Stephanie Nadine; Sims	French Montana; Stoopidondabeat	2:54
20.	"Losing Weight"	Kharbouch; Asa Taccone; Christopher Langlois; Breandain Langlois; Nembhard	Mixx	5:04
21.	"FWMGAB" (Remix) (featuring Moneybagg Yo)	Kharbouch; Demario White, Jr.; Jimeniz; Peters; Sims; Alfano	French Montana; Butterbeats; Stoopidondabeat	3:06
Total length:				60:10

Re-release track listing
No.	Title	Writer(s)	Producer(s)	Length
22.	"Cold" (featuring Tory Lanez)	Kharbouch; Daystar Peterson; Benjamin Hubble; Thomas Mkrtchyan	LayZbeats; Armotunez	3:39
Total length:				63:49

== Charts ==
Chart performance for They Got Amnesia
Chart (2021)	Peak position
Canadian Albums (Billboard)	51
US Billboard 200	59
US Top R&B/Hip-Hop Albums (Billboard)	23

== Release history ==
Release history and formats for They Got Amnesia
Region	Date	Format(s)	Label	Ref.
Various	November 19, 2021	Digital download; streaming	Coke Boy; Bad Boy; Epic	
