= Icy Grl =

2017 single by Saweetie

Single by Saweetie

from the EP High Maintenance
- Released: October 2, 2017
- Length: 1:49
- Label: Warner Bros.; Artistry
- Songwriters: Diamonté Harper; Khia Chambers; Michael Williams; Edward Meriwether
- Producers: Taz; Plat'num House

Saweetie singles chronology
"Icy Grl" (2017)	"Up Now" (2018)

Music video
- "Icy Grl" on YouTube

"Icy Grl" (pronounced "icy girl") is the debut single by American rapper Saweetie. It was first released through SoundCloud in 2017, before being released on October 2, 2017, as her debut commercial single and the lead single from her debut EP High Maintenance (2018). The song is a freestyle to "My Neck, My Back (Lick It)" by Khia.

== Background ==
Around the time she wrote the song, Saweetie had been renting rooms from Craigslist. She stated that she penned the lyrics in one such room that had nothing but a mattress. Unhappy with her state of affairs, Saweetie wrote about the person she wanted to be in the song to motivate herself.

Before her rise to fame, she posted videos of herself rapping in her car on Instagram. One of the videos featured Saweetie performing a freestyle rap to the beat "My Neck, My Back (Lick It)" by Khia, which she released on SoundCloud as well. It went viral on the Internet in the summer of 2017 and became her breakout single.

== Content ==
In the song, Saweetie raps about her goals in life and the person she wants to be in the future, as well as taking aim at her haters.

== Music video ==
A music video for the song was released in October 2017. It finds Saweetie hanging out inside of a mansion surrounded by palm trees.

== Remix ==
The official remix of the song was released on April 28, 2018 and is dubbed the "Bae Mix". It features vocals from American singer Kehlani, who performs a rap verse on the track, as well as a new verse from Saweetie.

== Charts ==
Chart (2018)	Peak position
US Bubbling Under Hot 100 Singles	6
US Rhythmic (Billboard)	16

== Certifications ==
Region	Certification	Certified units/sales
Canada (Music Canada)	Platinum	80,000^{‡}
New Zealand (RMNZ)	Gold	15,000^{‡}
United Kingdom (BPI)	Silver	200,000^{‡}
United States (RIAA)	2× Platinum	2,000,000^{‡}
^{‡} Sales+streaming figures based on certification alone.
