= Closer (Saweetie song) =

2022 single by Saweetie featuring H.E.R.

Single by Saweetie featuring H.E.R.
- Released: February 11, 2022
- Genre: Disco-pop
- Length: 2:49
- Label: Warner; Artistry
- Songwriters: Diamonte Harper; Gabriella Wilson; Ryan Ogren; Samuel Ahana; Alyssa Cantu; Bradley Powell; Randall Hammers
- Producers: Ogren; DJ Swish; Mike Crook; Kaine

Saweetie singles chronology
"Handstand" (2021)	"Closer" (2022)	"Baby Boo" (2022)

H.E.R. singles chronology
"Blessed & Free" (2021)	"Closer" (2022)	"Playa" (2022)

Music video
- "Closer" on YouTube

"Closer" is a song by American rapper Saweetie featuring American singer-songwriter H.E.R.. It was released on February 11, 2022.

== Composition and lyrics ==
"Closer" is a disco-pop song and has been described as "a confident singles anthem for Valentine's Day". Saweetie's lyrics pair up with H.E.R.'s vocals in the chorus as the two respectively rap and sing "over a bouncy '80s-inspired beat".

== Music video ==
The official music video for "Closer", directed by Hannah Lux Davis, premiered alongside the song on February 11, 2022. It starts with Saweetie and H.E.R. taking a group of women with her to the airport to fly. After getting their passports and COVID-19 test results checked, they start partying and Saweetie then goes on dates with three love interests.

== Charts ==
=== Weekly charts ===
Weekly chart performance for "Closer"
Chart (2022)	Peak position
Canada CHR/Top 40 (Billboard)	23
Canada Hot AC (Billboard)	45
New Zealand Hot Singles (RMNZ)	18
Slovakia Airplay (ČNS IFPI)	100
US Billboard Hot 100	89
US Hot R&B/Hip-Hop Songs (Billboard)	30
US Pop Airplay (Billboard)	15
US Rhythmic Airplay (Billboard)	7

=== Year-end charts ===
2022 year-end chart performance for "Closer"
Chart (2022)	Position
US Rhythmic (Billboard)	48

== Release history ==
Release history for "Closer"
Region	Date	Format	Label	Ref.
Various	February 11, 2022	Digital download; streaming	Warner; Artistry	
United States	February 15, 2022	Rhythmic contemporary radio	Warner; Artistry	
