= Baluga (Ljubićska) =

Baluga Балуга Baluga Ljubićska, Preljinska Baluga
- Village
- Location within Serbia
- Coordinates: 43°53′35″N 20°25′24″E
- Country: Serbia
- District: Moravica District
- Municipality: Čačak

Area
  - Total: 4.46 km^{2} (1.72 sq mi)
- Elevation: 217 m (712 ft)

Population (2011)
  - Total: 415
  - Density: 93.0/km^{2} (241/sq mi)
- Time zone: UTC+1 (CET)
  - Summer (DST): UTC+2 (CEST)

Baluga (Serbian Cyrillic: Балуга), also known as Baluga Ljubićska (Балуга Љубићска) and Preljinska Baluga (Прељинска Балуга), is a village in the municipality of Čačak, Serbia. According to the 2011 census, the village has a population of 415 people.
