= Fast (Motion) =

2021 single by Saweetie

Single by Saweetie
- Released: May 7, 2021
- Genre: Dance rap
- Length: 2:50
- Label: Warner; Artistry
- Songwriters: Diamonté Harper; Andre Davidson; Jesse St. John; Liana Banks; Paris "PJ" Jones; Sean Davidson
- Producer: The Monarch

Saweetie singles chronology
| "Confetti" (2021) | "Fast (Motion)" (2021) | "Talkin' Bout" (2021) |

"Fast (Motion)" is a song recorded by American rapper Saweetie. The song was released on May 7, 2021, via Icy and Warner Records.

== Background and release ==
The release of "Fast (Motion)" comes after a slew of songs, including Saweetie's own "Best Friend", which features Doja Cat. This was followed by the release of a remix for Gwen Stefani's "Slow Clap". Saweetie later released the extended play, Pretty Summer Playlist: Season 1. "Fast (Motion)" was released on May 7, 2021, via Icy and Warner Records.

== Composition ==
"Fast (Motion)" is a "kinetic dance-rap track" which Tom Breihan of Stereogum called "rubbery" and "energetic". The song was produced by The Monarch and was inspired by Miami dance culture.

== Music video ==
The music video for "Fast (Motion)" was directed by James Larese. Makeup is handled by Deanna Paley, who worked with Saweetie previously. In the video, Saweetie performs in multiple sporting activities, including soccer, American football, track and field, boxing, as well as skydiving and basketball. The video features a cameo from WNBA player A'ja Wilson.

== Charts ==
Chart performance for "Fast (Motion)"
| Chart (2021) | Peak position |
|---|---|
| New Zealand Hot Singles (RMNZ) | 34 |
| US Bubbling Under Hot 100 Singles (Billboard) | 24 |
| US Rhythmic (Billboard) | 11 |
