= Tap In =

2020 single by Saweetie

Single by Saweetie
- Released: June 17, 2020
- Genre: Hip hop
- Length: 2:19
- Label: Icy; Artistry; Warner
- Composers: LaMarquis Jefferson; Craig Love; James Phillips; Todd Shaw; Jonathan Smith; Lukasz Gottwald
- Lyricists: Diamonté Harper; Kelly Rowland; Gamal Lewis; Theron Thomas
- Producer: Dr. Luke

Saweetie singles chronology
| "Sway with Me" (2020) | "Tap In" (2020) | "Bussin 2.0" (2020) |

Music video
- "Tap In" on YouTube

"Tap In" is a song by American rapper Saweetie, released on June 17, 2020. The song samples rapper Too Short's signature 2006 single "Blow the Whistle", produced by Lil Jon. Too Short provides the intro on "Tap In". Produced and co-written by Dr. Luke, it marked Saweetie's second song to chart on the US Billboard Hot 100. The song was also featured in a scene of Black Mirror Season 6, Episode 1 "Joan Is Awful".

== Background ==
"Tap In" marks Saweetie's first release without a feature since 2019's "My Type"; she explained she had to focus on her artist development because it was something she struggled with. Saweetie stated that Too Short is one of her favorite rappers, and she was concerned that he would not like the song, however she got his blessing for the sample. With both artists being from California's Bay Area, Saweetie explained: "If you listen to Bay Area hip-hop, it's very fly. It's not necessarily punchlines, but like a fly way of describing what's happening to us or how we're feeling. It's super conversational and very relatable". The song was first previewed on Saweetie's Instagram, and debuted two days later on Apple Music's Beats 1 Radio with Zane Lowe.

Saweetie has become known for sampling classic hip hop tracks; she also sampled Khia's "My Neck, My Back" on her debut single "Icy Girl". She explained her frequent use of samples: "My specialty is able to have an ear for a beat that would sound good if I flipped it or if I sampled it. Hip-hop is built on samples".

"Tap In" continued the resurgence of producer Dr. Luke, whose career came to standstill after singer Kesha accused him of sexual assault. Earlier in 2020, he produced Doja Cat's US number-one single "Say So". He also worked with Kim Petras and produced Juice Wrld's top ten single "Wishing Well".

== Composition ==
"Tap In" flips the beat and the signature whistle sounds of "Blow the Whistle", with Too Short delivering the intro: "Don't ever stop if you want to be on top, bitch". Over a bouncy beat and "funky" bass and percussion, Saweetie raps about her wealth, dancing and her physical features.

== Critical reception ==
Aaron Williams of Uproxx called the song an "energetic, party-ready bop" and said Saweetie sounds rejuvenated on the song. In a positive review, HotNewHipHop's Mitch Findlay stated: "Taking to the infectious bass-driven groove, Saweetie breaks it down with a slick flow, revealing plenty of character as she slides into new and increasingly playful rhyme schemes", and concluded that "her confidence and infectious energy" is seemingly boundless. Travis Grier of Def Pen said the song highlights Saweetie's assets "straight from the beginning" and noted that she lacks no confidence "in any capacity". Vibe called it a "fresh new spin on an old classic". Conversely, Earmilk's Hayley Tharp questioned whether Saweetie relies "on already established beats to resonate with listeners, or could this be a careful tactic to build her brand?" Tharp further said Saweetie's verses in the song "leave much to be desired" and "while the hook is memorable, the repetitiveness makes up most of the song. This track's brevity mirrors her previous singles rapping about rich men, a slim waist, and a full derriere".

== Music video ==
The song's official video was released along with the song, on June 17, 2020. Saweetie noted "There's choreo, the looks are crazy. My glam is just real cute" and said her image in the video is how she dressed in high school; baggy pants and a loose t-shirt. She sports claw-like red nails, long hair and bamboo earrings in the visual, which features high-energy dance choreography on an iced-out basketball court.

== Remix ==
A remix featuring American rappers Post Malone, DaBaby, and Jack Harlow was released on August 28, 2020. It was teased by Saweetie on social media ten days prior, on August 18, in which there was one featured artist for fans to guess, which was Post Malone.

== Awards and nominations ==
| Year | Organization | Award | Result | Ref. |
|---|---|---|---|---|
| 2020 | MTV Video Music Awards | Song of Summer | Nominated | |

== Charts ==
=== Weekly charts ===
Chart performance of "Tap In"
| Chart (2020–2021) | Peak position |
|---|---|
| Australia (ARIA) | 37 |
| Belgium (Ultratip Bubbling Under Flanders) | 31 |
| Canada (Canadian Hot 100) | 46 |
| Global 200 (Billboard) | 42 |
| Ireland (IRMA) | 35 |
| New Zealand (Recorded Music NZ) | 38 |
| Portugal (AFP) | 170 |
| Romania (Airplay 100) | 93 |
| Sweden Heatseeker (Sverigetopplistan) | 13 |
| UK Singles (OCC) | 38 |
| UK Hip Hop/R&B (OCC) | 27 |
| US Billboard Hot 100 | 20 |
| US Hot R&B/Hip-Hop Songs (Billboard) | 9 |
| US Pop Airplay (Billboard) | 28 |
| US Rhythmic (Billboard) | 2 |
| US Rolling Stone Top 100 | 17 |

=== Year-end charts ===
Year-end chart performance of "Tap In"
| Chart (2020) | Position |
|---|---|
| US Hot R&B/Hip-Hop Songs (Billboard) | 53 |
| US Rhythmic (Billboard) | 17 |

== Certifications ==
Certifications for "Tap In"
| Region | Certification | Certified units/sales |
|---|---|---|
| Canada (Music Canada) | 2× Platinum | 160,000^{‡} |
| New Zealand (RMNZ) | Platinum | 30,000^{‡} |
| Poland (ZPAV) | Gold | 25,000^{‡} |
| United Kingdom (BPI) | Silver | 200,000^{‡} |
| United States (RIAA) | Platinum | 1,000,000^{‡} |
^{‡} Sales+streaming figures based on certification alone.

== Release history ==
Release history of "Tap In"
| Country | Date | Format | Label | Ref. |
|---|---|---|---|---|
| Various | June 17, 2020 | Digital download; streaming | Icy; Artistry; Warner | |
| United States | August 11, 2020 | Contemporary hit radio | Icy; Artistry; Warner | |
