= Beluga (vodka) =

Beluga Super-Premium Vodka brand

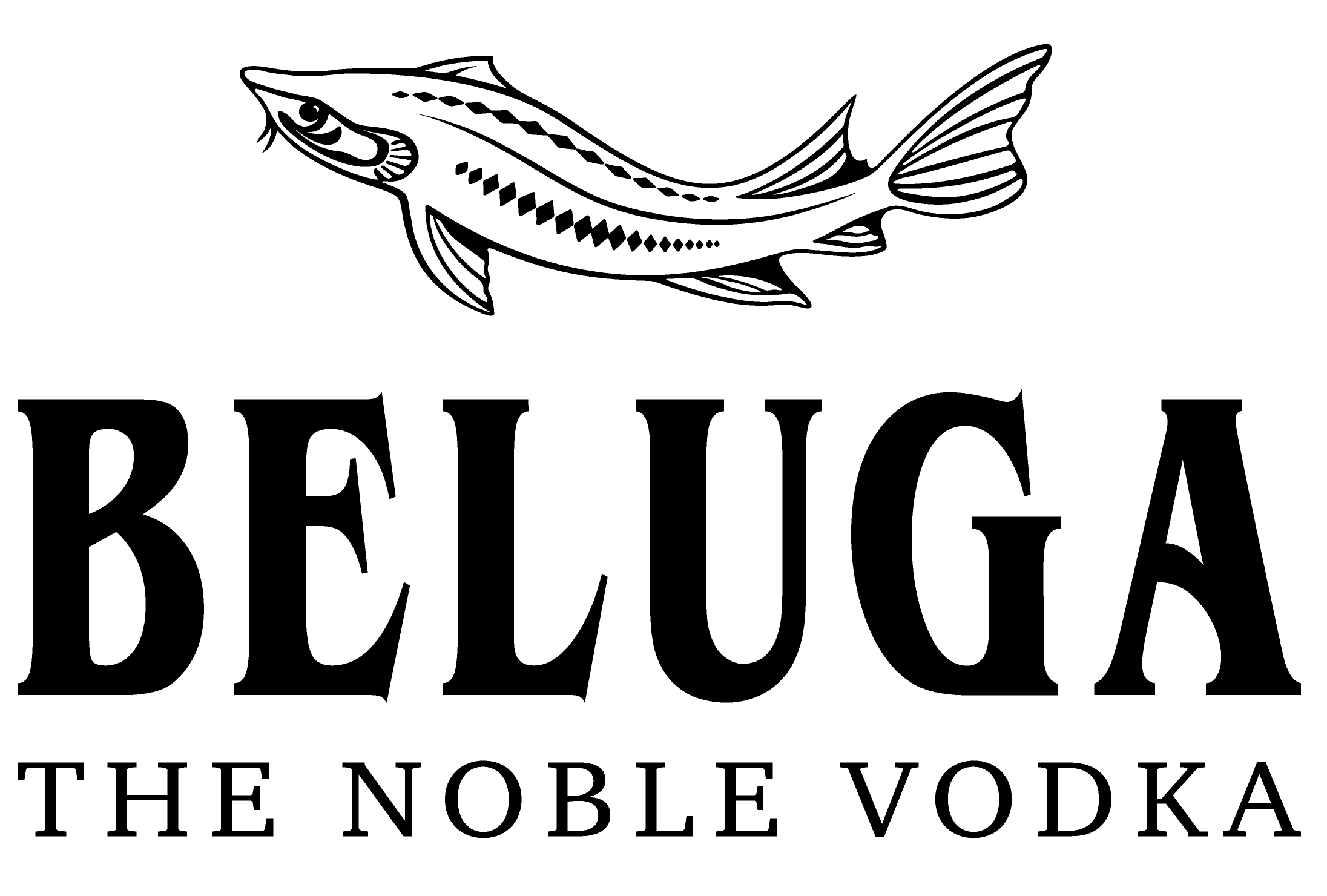

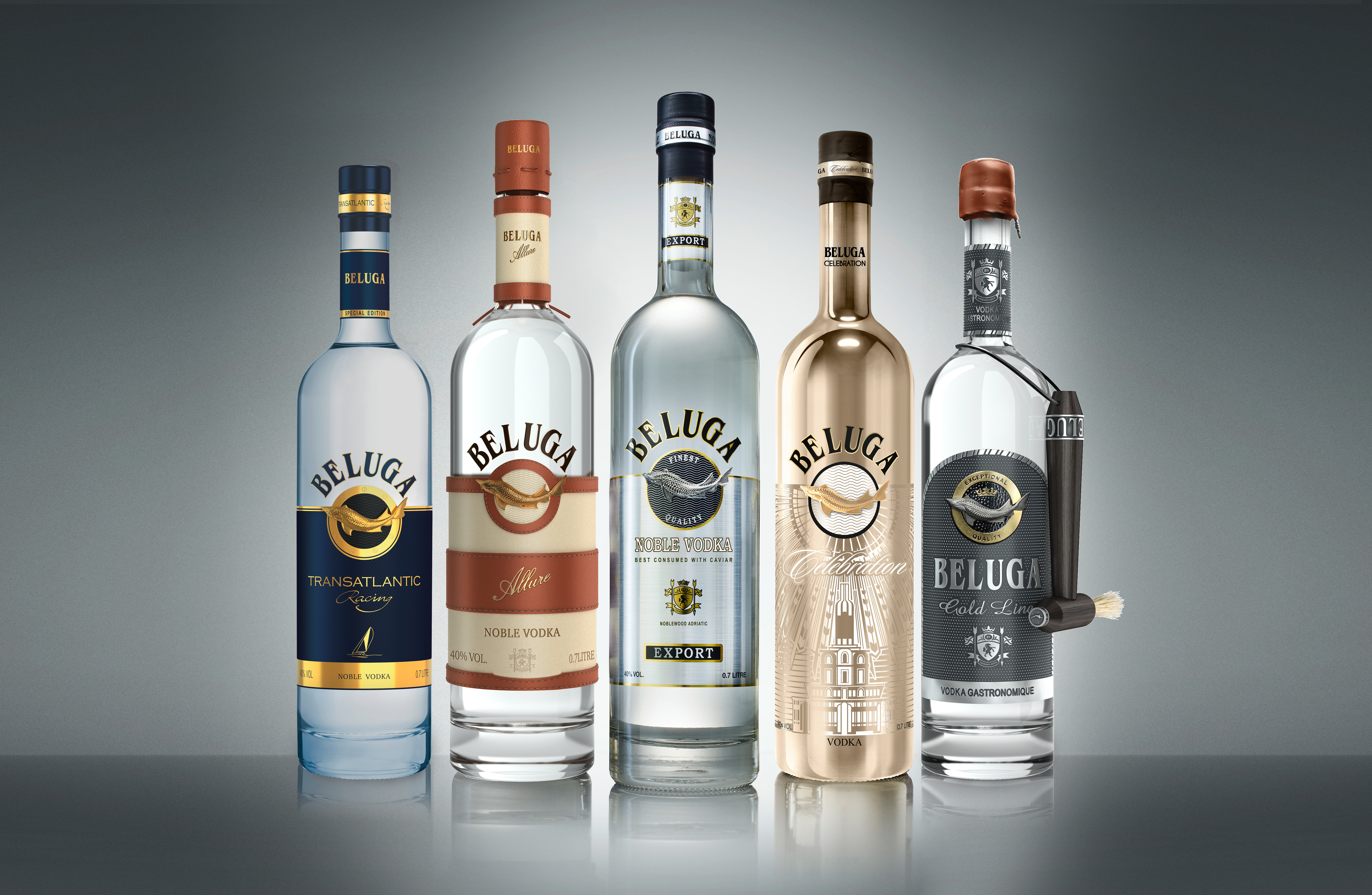
- Manufacturer: Noblewood Group
- Origin: Montenegro
- Alcohol by volume: 40
- Website: https://vodka-beluga.com/home/

Beluga Noble Vodka is a brand of Super-Premium vodka produced and bottled by Noblewood Group in Montenegro.

Beluga Noble Russian Vodka was originally created in 2002 by the Mariinsk distillery. Mariinsk itself was founded in the 18th century in Siberia. In May 2016, Beluga partnered with Summergate Fine Wine & Spirits to be the exclusive importer and distributor of the brand in Greater China. In October 2022, the international rights to the Beluga brand were sold to Noblewood Group. The estimated size of the transaction was over $75 million. In March 2023, Noblewood Group officially commenced production in Montenegro.
