= High Maintenance (Saweetie EP) =

EP by Saweetie
- Released: March 16, 2018
- Recorded: 2017–18
- Genre: Hip hop
- Length: 22:07
- Label: Warner Bros.; Artistry
- Producer: Saweetie; Max Gousse; CashMoneyAP; David Khaffaf; Lil Jon; Lumey; Nyrell; Plat'num House; Saweetie; Taz; Zaytoven

Saweetie chronology
High Maintenance (2018)	ICY (2019)

Singles from High Maintenance
- 1. "Icy Grl" Released: October 2, 2017

Professional ratings
Review scores
Source	Rating
HipHopDX	3.8/5
Pitchfork	6.7/10

High Maintenance is the debut extended play (EP) by American rapper Saweetie. It was released digitally on March 16, 2018, by Warner Bros. Records and Artistry Worldwide. It is composed of nine tracks, with "Icy Grl" having been released as a single on October 2, 2017. The EP debuted at number 32 on the Billboard R&B/Hip-Hop Album Sales chart.

== Background ==
After graduating, Saweetie decided to pursue a rap career. She began posting short raps on her Instagram account in 2016. One video featured her rapping over the beat from Khia's classic "My Neck, My Back (Lick It)", which would eventually turn into "Icy Grl". She first released the song on her SoundCloud in the summer of 2017 and later released a music video for it in October of the same year. The visual would go viral online. To follow that up, Saweetie released in that same month a freestyle rap called "High Maintenance" accompanied by a short clip of herself rapping a verse to the song, all while in her kitchen. It would go viral on Instagram and Twitter as well. In February 2018, she signed to Warner Records and her manager Max Gousse's record label Artistry Worldwide, subsequently releasing the EP High Maintenance in March 2018.

== Composition and concept ==
I do a lot of covers but this is the first time I'm actually doing original content. I leave the studio and I come home wanting to listen to really myself.

— Saweetie for XXL in October 2017.

The songs "B.A.N." and "23" speak about relationships, and are speculated to be about her ex-boyfriends Justin Combs, who is P. Diddy's eldest son, and Keith Powers, whom she dated for up to four years.

With "high maintenance", Saweetie reportedly doesn't mean only designer things. "The relationships I have with people are very high maintenance, meaning I nurture them," she says. "Essentially, I care for them. I also pray a lot, work out, and eat well so all aspects of my life are high maintenance... Since it's an introductory to the game, I feel like it's appropriate way to brand myself."

== Track listing ==
High Maintenance
No.	Title	Writer(s)	Producer(s)	Length
1.	"Intro"	Diamonté Harper; Gino Borri	Saweetie	0:30
2.	"B.A.N."	Harper; Borri; Konan; David Khaffaf	Bone Collector; Khaffaf	3:00
3.	"Agua"	Harper; Borri; Xavier Dotson	Zaytoven	3:10
4.	"Good Good"	Harper; Borri; Alex Petit; Adam Small	CashMoneyAP; Lumey	3:21
5.	"Icy Grl"	Harper; Khia Chambers; Michael Williams; Edward Meriwether	Taz; Plat'num House	1:49
6.	"High Maintenance"	Harper; Todd Shaw; Jonathan Smith	Lil Jon	0:49
7.	"23"	Harper; Nyrell Slade	Nyrell	2:45
8.	"Respect"	Harper; Petit	CashMoneyAP	2:44
9.	"Too Many"	Harper; Borri; Petit; Ryan Gladieux	CashMoneyAP	3:58
Total length:				22:07

=== Notes ===
- "Icy Grl" contains samples of "My Neck, My Back (Lick It)", originally performed by Khia.
- "High Maintenance" contains samples of "Shake That Monkey", originally performed by Too Short.

== Personnel ==
Credits adapted from AllMusic.

- Gino the Ghost – background vocals
- Jonathan Cuskey – recording
- Ryan Gladieux – recording, mixing
- Jean-Marie Horvat – recording, mixing
- Leon McQuay – mixing
- Emerson Mancini – mastering

== Charts ==
Chart (2018)	Peak position
US R&B/Hip-Hop Album Sales (Billboard)	32

== Release history ==
Region	Date	Format(s)	Label	Ref.
Various	March 16, 2018	Digital download	Icy; Artistry; Warner Bros.	
