= My Type (Saweetie song) =

- Cover of the remix featuring City Girls and Jhené Aiko

Single by Saweetie

from the EP Icy
- Released: June 11, 2019
- Genre: Crunk
- Length: 2:06
- Label: Warner; Artistry
- Composers: Craig Love; Jonathan Smith; LaMarquis Jefferson; London Holmes; Moses Barrett III; Nevaeh Jolie; Roark Bailey
- Lyricists: Diamonté Harper; Adam Small; Aleicia Gibson; Aubrey Robinson; Corey Evans; Chase Lett; Gino Borri; Quavious Marshall
- Producer: London on da Track

Saweetie singles chronology
"Up Now" (2018)	"My Type" (2019)	"Sway with Me" (2020)

Music video
- "My Type" on YouTube

"My Type" is a song by American rapper Saweetie, released as a single on June 11, 2019, by Warner Records and Artistry Worldwide. It was first released as part of her 2019 EP Icy, and a music video was released for the track in July 2019. It was the basis of a social media challenge, and also became Saweetie's first entry on the US Billboard Hot 100, debuting at number 81 before peaking at 21. The song was written by Saweetie and produced by London on da Track, and samples the production of "Freek-a-Leek" by Petey Pablo, produced by Lil Jon.

== Background ==
The track samples "Freek-a-Leek" by Petey Pablo. The sampled track earned Pablo, who took "Freek-a-Leek" to number 2 on Billboard's Rhythmic Songs Chart in 2004, a second No. 1 as a songwriter on Rhythmic Songs overall (his first being Ciara's "Goodies", on which he provided featured vocals), while co-writer Lil Jon earned an eighth No. 1, and the song's co-writer Quavo his fifth on the same chart.

== Music video ==
The music video was released on July 3, 2019, and directed by Daps. The video was filmed in San Leandro, California at Cherry Grove Park and San Leandro Adult School. It features Saweetie at a block party, rapping in front of drifting cars and twerking while standing on a basketball hoop. The video includes appearances by Kehlani and Kamaiyah.

== Remixes ==
On August 23, a remix featuring Yung Miami of City Girls and Jhené Aiko was released. On September 20, 2019, a Latin remix featuring Becky G and Melii was released. On October 25, 2019, a remix EP titled My Type (The Remixes) was released including the original song, both remixes, and remixes from Dillon Francis, French Montana, Wale, Tiwa Savage, and others.

== Live performances ==
At the 2019 BET Hip-Hop Awards, Saweetie performed "My Type" live alongside its "Freek-a-Leek" sampled artist Petey Pablo and producer Lil Jon.

== Charts ==
=== Original version ===
==== Weekly charts ====
Chart (2019–2020)	Peak position
Australian Hitseekers (ARIA)	6
Canada (Canadian Hot 100)	76
New Zealand Hot Singles (RMNZ)	32
Romania (Airplay 100)	78
US Billboard Hot 100	21
US Hot R&B/Hip-Hop Songs (Billboard)	10
US Mainstream Top 40 (Billboard)	24
US Rhythmic (Billboard)	1
US Dance/Mix Show Airplay (Billboard)	39
US Rolling Stone Top 100	27

=== Remix ===
Chart (2019)	Peak position
New Zealand Hot Singles (RMNZ)	38

=== Year-end charts ===
Chart (2019)	Position
US Billboard Hot 100	76
US Hot R&B/Hip-Hop Songs (Billboard)	32
US Rhythmic (Billboard)	13

== Certifications ==
Region	Certification	Certified units/sales
Australia (ARIA)	Gold	35,000^{‡}
Canada (Music Canada)	4× Platinum	320,000^{‡}
New Zealand (RMNZ)	2× Platinum	60,000^{‡}
Poland (ZPAV)	Platinum	50,000^{‡}
United Kingdom (BPI)	Silver	200,000^{‡}
United States (RIAA)	4× Platinum	4,000,000^{‡}
^{‡} Sales+streaming figures based on certification alone.

== Release history ==
Region	Date	Format	Label	Ref.
United States	June 11, 2019	Rhythmic contemporary	Icy; Artistry; Warner	
United States	August 27, 2019	Contemporary hit radio	Icy; Artistry; Warner	
