= Back to the Streets =

2020 single by Saweetie featuring Jhené Aiko

"Back To The Streets"

Single by Saweetie featuring Jhené Aiko
- Released: October 23, 2020
- Genre: Pop rap
- Length: 3:09
- Label: Warner; Artistry
- Songwriters: Diamonté Harper; Jhené Aiko; Aleicia Gibson; Federico Vindver; Gino Borri; Jose Velaquez; Matthew Crabtree; Michael Suski; Sara Mitchell; Simon Plummer; Timothy Mosley
- Producers: Timbaland; MTK; Federico Vindver; Angel López; Drtwrk

Saweetie singles chronology
"Money Mouf" (2020)	"Back To The Streets" (2020)	"Best Friend" (2021)

Jhené Aiko singles chronology
"B.S." (2020)	"Back to the Streets" (2020)	"By Yourself" (2021)

Music video
- "Back to the Streets" on YouTube

"Back to the Streets" is a song by American rapper Saweetie, released on October 23, 2020. The song features American singer Jhené Aiko, and was produced by Timbaland.

== Composition ==
Tom Breihan of Stereogum called the song a "pleasant, laid-back singsong melodic rap track". The instrumental contains "smooth piano chords and bouncy percussion". Saweetie sing-raps about being partners with one man before moving on to the next. Saweetie mentions in Genius interview that she includes "I really pulled from my experiences my home girls' experiences, my cousins' experiences and I put them into one record". In the Genius interview she talks about how she wanted to approach the breakup song different by giving it an upbeat rhythm although the lyrics convey a much deeper meaning.

== Chart performance ==
The song debuted at number 76 on the Billboard Hot 100. Shortly after the release of the song "Best Friend", the song re-entered the chart and peaked at number 58.

== Music video ==
The music video was released on November 20, 2020. Directed by Daniel Russell, it finds Saweetie floating on clouds as she sings.

== Charts ==
=== Weekly charts ===
Chart (2020–2021)	Peak position
New Zealand Hot Singles (RMNZ)	17
US Billboard Hot 100	58
US Hot R&B/Hip-Hop Songs (Billboard)	21
US Rhythmic Airplay (Billboard)	1

=== Year-end charts ===
Chart (2021)	Position
US Hot R&B/Hip-Hop Songs (Billboard)	71
US Rhythmic (Billboard)	25

== Certifications ==
Region	Certification	Certified units/sales
Canada (Music Canada)	Gold	40,000^{‡}
New Zealand (RMNZ)	Gold	15,000^{‡}
United States (RIAA)	Platinum	1,000,000^{‡}
^{‡} Sales+streaming figures based on certification alone.
