= Best Friend (Saweetie song) =

2021 single by Saweetie featuring Doja Cat

Single by Saweetie featuring Doja Cat
- Released: January 7, 2021
- Recorded: 2020
- Genre: Hip hop
- Length: 2:35
- Label: Warner; Artistry
- Songwriters: Diamonté Harper; Amala Dlamini; Asia Smith; Kaine; Lukasz Gottwald; Rocco Valdes; Theron Thomas
- Producers: Dr. Luke; Rocco Did It Again!

Saweetie singles chronology
"Back to the Streets" (2020)	"Best Friend" (2021)	"Slow Clap" (2021)

Doja Cat singles chronology
"Baby, I'm Jealous" (2020)	"Best Friend" (2021)	"34+35" (remix) (2021)

Alternative cover
- Cover art for Stefflon Don remix. The remixes EP also uses this cover art, but with "Remix EP" or "Remix EP (Expanded Edition)" on the bottom-right corner of the "Best Friend" text.

Music video
- "Best Friend" on YouTube

"Best Friend" is a song by American rapper Saweetie featuring fellow American rapper and singer Doja Cat, released on January 7, 2021. The song was written by the two performers along with Asia Smith, Kaine, Theron Thomas, and producers Dr. Luke and Rocco Did It Again!.

The song's first official remix features vocals from British rapper Stefflon Don, while the second features Chinese rapper VaVa. A third, with New Zealand rapper JessB and Australian singer Okenyo, a fourth, with South Korean singer Jamie and South Korean/Japanese rapper Chanmina, and fifth, with German rapper Katja Krasavice, were also released. The latter debuted at number one in Germany, becoming the first number-one single there for both Saweetie and Doja Cat. The single also won Saweetie her first Video Music Award for Best Art Direction. The song also received a nomination for Best Rap Song at the 64th Annual Grammy Awards.

== Background and release ==
On December 4, 2020, "Best Friend" was released prematurely on streaming platforms. Saweetie later took to social media to express her disappointment in her record label, Warner Records, in regards to handling the release. She stated: "I am extremely disappointed in my label WBR for prematurely releasing a single I was so excited about. I feel disrespected. I'm hands on with ALL of my creative & had such a dope rollout for 'best friends'. The thirst for clout & $ is real & it overrides the artists' art." The single was later taken off streaming services the following day. "Best Friend" was then officially released on January 7, 2021 for digital download and streaming. The track was sent to both contemporary hit radio and rhythmic contemporary radio in the United States on January 12, 2021.

== Composition and reception ==
The hip hop song was described as a "danceable", "club-ready", and "fun, uptempo record that celebrates friendship." Lyrically, the rappers highlight and hype up each other's beauty, success, independence, wealth, and loyalty.

=== Accolades ===
Critical rankings for "Best Friend"
Publication	Accolade	Rank	Ref.
Pitchfork	The 100 Best Songs of 2021	54	

== Music video ==
Filmed in November 2020, The Dave Meyers directed music video was released alongside the song on January 7, 2021. The video consists of Saweetie and Doja Cat in various settings including driving and posing in front of a bedazzled Tesla as well as jumping off of a cliff into the ocean. The video also features an appearance from Canadian comedian King Bach. Althea Legaspi of Rolling Stone noted that they call out misogyny and celebrate camaraderie in the music video. Upon release, Saweetie was accused of stealing the concept of the music video from "BFF" by R&B duo Ceraadi. As of October 2025, the music video has reached over 330 million views on YouTube.

== Usage in media ==
- The song was used in the official trailers for the 2022 Disney+ film Chip 'n Dale: Rescue Rangers and Dreamworks Animation's 2026 film Forgotten Island.
- The song was featured in Airbnb's TV ad "Girls Trip".
- The song was used in the 2025 Disney+ series Ironheart, part of Phase Five of the Marvel Cinematic Universe.

== Charts ==
=== Weekly charts ===
Chart performance for "Best Friend"
Chart (2021)	Peak position
Australia (ARIA)	35
Austria (Ö3 Austria Top 40) Katja Krasavice version	51
Canada Hot 100 (Billboard)	40
Canada CHR/Top 40 (Billboard)	39
Global 200 (Billboard)	31
Germany (GfK) Katja Krasavice version	1
Greece (IFPI)	34
Ireland (IRMA)	36
Lithuania (AGATA)	54
New Zealand (Recorded Music NZ)	39
Portugal (AFP)	117
Romania (Airplay 100)	67
Slovakia (Singles Digitál Top 100)	64
Switzerland (Schweizer Hitparade) Katja Krasavice version	96
UK Singles (Official Charts)	35
UK Hip Hop/R&B (Official Charts)	16
US Billboard Hot 100	14
US Dance Airplay (Billboard)	21
US Hot R&B/Hip-Hop Songs (Billboard)	6
US Pop Airplay (Billboard)	9
US R&B/Hip-Hop Airplay (Billboard)	14
US Rhythmic Airplay (Billboard)	1

=== Year-end charts ===
Year-end chart performance for "Best Friend"
Chart (2021)	Position
Australia (ARIA)	86
Canada (Canadian Hot 100)	84
Global 200 (Billboard)	86
US Billboard Hot 100	29
US Hot R&B/Hip-Hop Songs (Billboard)	12
US Mainstream Top 40 (Billboard)	26
US Rhythmic (Billboard)	10

== Certifications ==
Region	Certification	Certified units/sales
Australia (ARIA)	Gold	35,000^{‡}
Canada (Music Canada)	4× Platinum	320,000^{‡}
France (SNEP)	Gold	100,000^{‡}
New Zealand (RMNZ)	2× Platinum	60,000^{‡}
Poland (ZPAV)	Platinum	50,000^{‡}
United Kingdom (BPI)	Gold	400,000^{‡}
United States (RIAA)	4× Platinum	4,000,000^{‡}
^{‡} Sales+streaming figures based on certification alone.

== Release history ==
Region	Date	Format(s)	Version	Label(s)	Ref.
Various	January 7, 2021	Digital download; streaming	Original	Warner Records; Artistry	
United States	January 12, 2021	Contemporary hit radio	Original	Warner	
United States	January 12, 2021	Rhythmic contemporary	Original	Warner	
Various	March 5, 2021	Digital download; streaming	Stefflon Don remix	Icy; Warner	
Various	March 19, 2021	Digital download; streaming	Remixes (Note: Remixes EP released on March 19, 2021, included original version of the song, previously released Stefflon Don remix, as well as remixes featuring VaVa or JessB with Okenyo. The remix EP released on April 23, 2021, was dubbed as "Extended Edition" and included afromentioned versions in addition of renditions featuring Katja Krasavice or Chanmina, and remixes by Party Pupils and Kito.)	Icy; Warner	
Various	April 23, 2021	Digital download; streaming	Remixes	Icy; Warner	
