= Saweetie =

American rapper (born 1993)

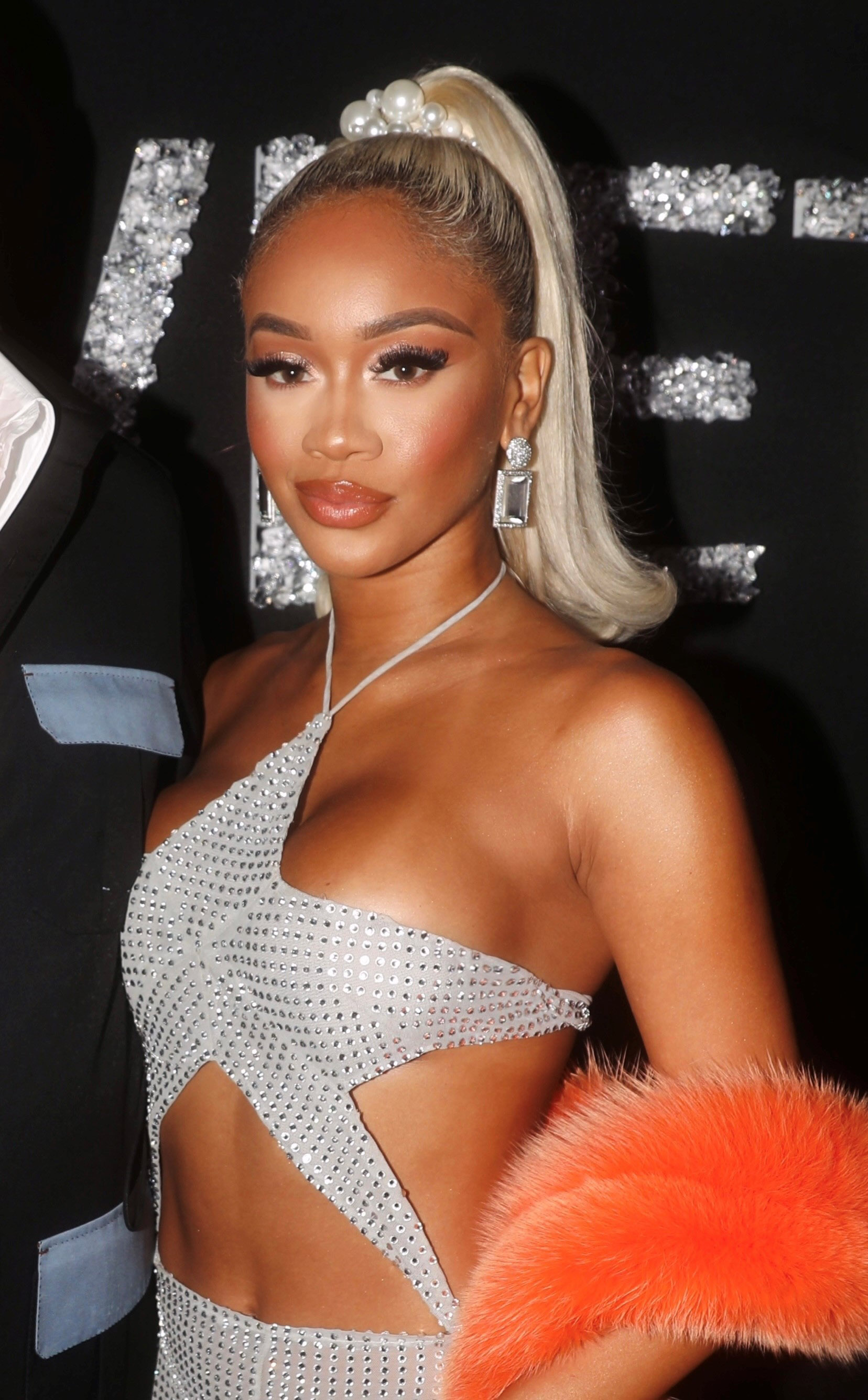
- Saweetie in 2021
- Born: Diamonté Quiava Valentin Harper; July 2, 1993 (age 33); Santa Clara, California, U.S.
- Education: University of Southern California (BA)
- Occupations: Rapper; songwriter; actress
- Years active: 2016–present
- Works: Discography
- Relatives: Willie Harper (grandfather); Josh Harper (uncle); MC Hammer (uncle); Gabrielle Union (cousin); Zaytoven (cousin)
- Musical career
- Genre: West Coast hip-hop
- Labels: Warner; Artistry; Icy
- Website: saweetie.com
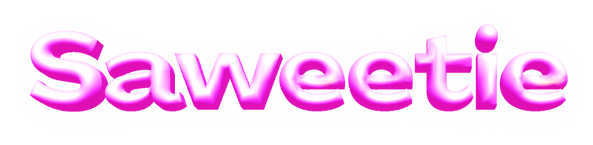

Diamonté Quiava Valentin Harper (born July 2, 1993), known professionally as Saweetie (/səˈwiːti/ sə-WEE-tee; also pronounced as simply "sweetie"), is an American rapper. Her 2017 debut single, "Icy Grl", received double platinum certification by the Recording Industry Association of America (RIAA) and led her to sign with Warner Records.

Her debut extended play (EP), High Maintenance (2018) was met with lukewarm reception and failed to chart. Her second, Icy (2019) moderately entered the Billboard 200 and spawned the single "My Type", which marked her first entry—at number 21—on the Billboard Hot 100 and received quadruple platinum certification by the RIAA. Her 2020 single, "Tap In" and her 2021 single, "Best Friend" (featuring Doja Cat), both peaked within the chart's top 20. At the 64th Annual Grammy Awards, the latter song earned a nomination for Best Rap/Sung Performance, while Harper herself was nominated for Best New Artist.

== Early life and education ==
Diamonté Quiava Valentin Harper was born on July 2, 1993, in Santa Clara, California, to Trinidad Valentin, a Chinese and Filipina former video vixen, and Johnny Harper, who is African American. She grew up in Hayward and later in Sacramento, attending Merrill F. West High School in Tracy and graduating from Monterey Trail High School in Elk Grove. She began writing music at age 13. After high school, she attended San Diego State University, where she studied communication and business before transferring to the University of Southern California, where she completed her degree and received a Bachelor of Arts (BA) in Communication. After graduating in 2016, she began to focus on her rap career.

== Career ==
=== 2016–2018: High Maintenance ===
Saweetie began posting clips of her freestyles to her Instagram account in 2016. One video featured her rapping over the beat from fellow female rapper Khia's "My Neck, My Back (Lick It)", which eventually became "Icy Grl". The song was released on her SoundCloud in the summer of 2017 and brought her to the attention of Max Gousse, a well-known producer and A&R executive, who became her manager. The video went viral online, accruing 100 million views on YouTube as of June 2020.

That same month, Saweetie released a freestyle rap, "High Maintenance", accompanied by a short clip of herself rapping a verse to the song, which also went viral on Instagram and Twitter. In October 2017, she released a video for her song "Focus", which samples DRAM's "Gilligan".

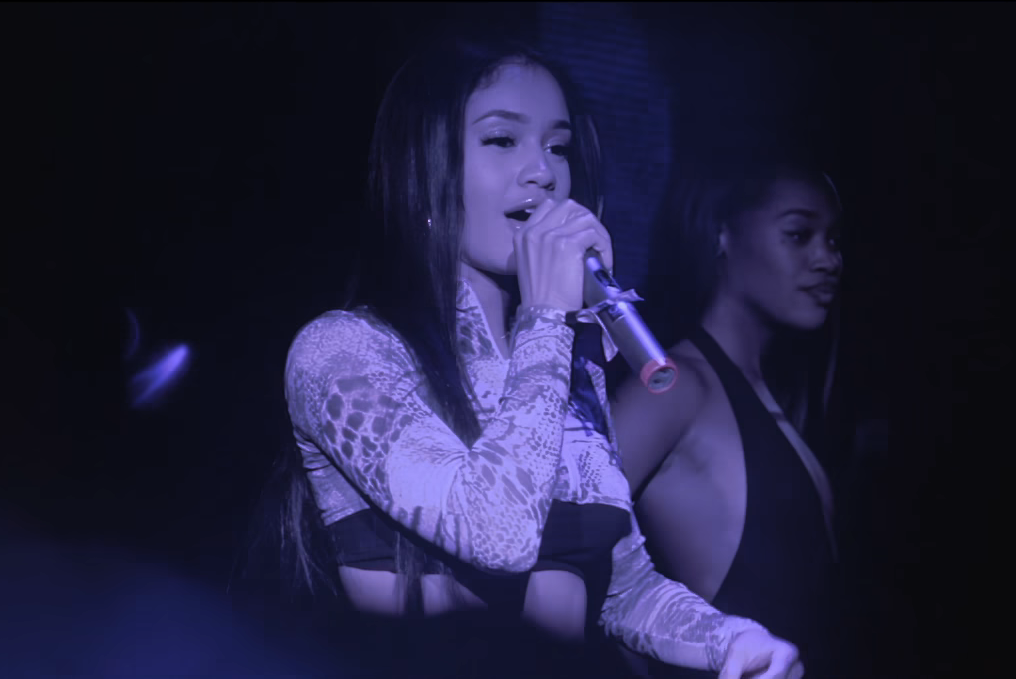
Saweetie performing in 2018

In January 2018, Saweetie was named Tidal's Artist of the Week and one of Pigeons & Planes's Best New Artists of the Month. During Super Bowl LII in February 2018, she was featured in an ad for Rihanna's cosmetic company, Fenty Beauty. That month, she signed to Warner Bros. Records (since May 2019 Warner Records) and Gousse's record label, Artistry Worldwide.

I do a lot of covers but this is the first time I'm actually doing original content. I leave the studio and I come home wanting to listen to really myself.

— Saweetie for XXL in October 2017.

In February 2018, Saweetie launched her own record label, Icy Records.

Saweetie released her major label debut EP, High Maintenance, on March 16, 2018. It has nine tracks and was produced by CashMoneyAP, Nyrell and Saweetie's cousin, Zaytoven. The single "Icy Girl" was certified Gold in June 2018, for sales of 500,000 in the U.S. In September 2019, the single was certified RIAA multi-platinum and reached No. 1 on Billboard's rhythmic songs airplay chart.

=== 2019–2020: Icy and other ventures ===
Saweetie released her second major label EP album, Icy, on March 29, 2019. Its first single, "My Type", written by Saweetie and produced by London on da Track, samples the 2004 song "Freek-a-Leek" by Petey Pablo. Debuting on the Billboard Hot 100 at number 81 on the charts, It was Saweetie's first song to enter the Billboard Hot 100. "My Type" peaked at number 21, becoming Saweetie's first top-40 hit on the Billboard Hot 100. A remix of the song featuring Jhené Aiko and City Girls was released on August 23, 2019. "My Type" hit number 1 on the Rhythmic Radio charts in September 2019 and was later certified double platinum in the U.S.

In September 2019, Saweetie collaborated with PrettyLittleThing to launch a 59-piece clothing collection, PrettyLittleThing x Saweetie. She said the theme of the capsule was "a boujie rich girl enjoying the finer things in life. I want to show the boys and girls that if you hustle hard your work will pay off." It debuted during New York Fashion Week. Saweetie appeared on VH1's Nick Cannon Presents: Wild 'N Out on January 28, 2020, as a guest performer, performing "My Type".

=== 2020–present: Pretty Bitch Music ===
Saweetie released the lead single, "Tap In", from her upcoming debut album, Pretty Bitch Music, on June 20, 2020. The single peaked at number 20 on the Billboard Hot 100, becoming her first top-20 single and her first song to enter the UK Singles Chart, peaking at number 38. In September 2020, the single reached number one on Mediabase's Urban Radio Chart as well as the Billboard x Triller US and Global charts. The track was Saweetie's second single to reach Billboard's Hot 100. In August 2020, Saweetie released a remix of the single, "Tap in Remix", that featured rappers Post Malone, DaBaby and Jack Harlow. This was followed by the promotional single "Pretty Bitch Freestyle" on July 2, 2020.

On July 31, 2020, Saweetie appeared alongside American rapper Tay Money on the song "Bussin 2.0", with a music video premiering the same day. On August 6, 2020, she was featured on Ava Max's song, "Kings & Queens, Pt. 2", alongside Lauv. On October 23, 2020, she released "Back to the Streets" (featuring Jhené Aiko), which serves as the second single from Pretty Bitch Music. The album's third single, "Best Friend" (featuring Doja Cat), was released on January 7, 2021.

In 2020, Saweetie was added to Forbes' 30 Under 30 Music list and Variety's Hitmakers Impact list. In March 2020, she embarked on her first beauty collaboration by becoming the face of the KISS Colors edge fixer glue in the Edge Fixer Glued x Saweetie collection. In October 2020, she launched her own virtual educational content series, Icy University.

As of March 2021, Saweetie has also launched a jewelry line, a capsule clothing collection (partnering with retailer PrettyLittleThing), and a co-branded makeup collection with cosmetics retailer Morphe. Her other brand partnerships include her February 2021 Essenchills collection with Sinful Colors, and the Saweetie Meal at McDonald's in August 2021. Saweetie also expanded her appearances by hosting Culture Con 2021 for creatives of color and making her television acting debut as the character Indigo in 3 episodes of Grown-ish.

In April 2021, Saweetie released the extended play Pretty Summer Playlist: Season 1. It was supported by the singles "Risky" (featuring Drakeo the Ruler) and "Talkin' Bout" by Loui, featuring Saweetie. On April 30, 2021, Saweetie collaborated with British girl group Little Mix to be featured on the remix version of its song "Confetti" with a video released the same day. The song peaked at number nine on the UK Singles Chart . On May 7, 2021, Saweetie released "Fast (Motion)" as the fourth single from Pretty Bitch Music.

In November 2021, Netflix released a sex-positive comedy special titled Sex: Unzipped in which Saweetie was the host. On November 19, she released the single "Icy Chain" which she performed on Saturday Night Live the following day. During her SNL debut, she also performed "Tap In" and "Best Friend". In January 2022, Saweetie appeared as the star of MAC Cosmetics' "Challenge Accepted" campaign alongside Cher.

On November 18, 2022, Saweetie released her fourth EP, The Single Life, which sold 2,000 units within its first week. The EP was preceded by the single "Don't Say Nothin'", which was posted just hours ahead of the project's release.

In July 2023, it was announced that Saweetie would co-headline a tour with YG and Tyga for the west coast and Canada. It was announced on September 12, 2023 that the tour was canceled.

On May 30, 2024, Saweetie made a surprise appearance for Japanese female professional wrestling league Sukeban during their Los Angeles stop. Saweetie waved to the crowd and valeted the Harajuku Stars coming out to her song "Nani."

On August 1, 2024, Saweetie's music video for her single "My Best" was uploaded onto YouTube, which was shot in her old high school and directed by herself.

== Personal life ==
Saweetie is the first cousin once-removed of actress Gabrielle Union. Her grandfather Willie Harper played football for the San Francisco 49ers, and her uncle Josh Harper played football most notably for the Fresno State Bulldogs.

Saweetie began dating fellow rapper Quavo of the group Migos in September 2018. They were first seen together during the New York Fashion Week. On March 19, 2021, Saweetie confirmed via social media that she and Quavo were no longer together. She also mentioned on social media that Quavo had been unfaithful, writing "Presents don't band aid scars and the love isn't real when the intimacy is given to other women." In late March 2021, video footage surfaced showing the pair in a physical altercation that allegedly happened in 2020.

Since 2025, Saweetie has been in a relationship with English footballer Jadon Sancho.

== Discography ==
- Pretty Bitch Music (TBA)

== Filmography ==
Year	Title	Role	Notes
2020	The Eric Andre Show	Herself	Season 5, Episode 2
2020	Wild 'n Out	Herself	Season 14, Episode 9 Guest Performer
2021	Grown-ish	Indigo	3 episodes Credited as Diamonté Harper
2021	Cooking with Paris	Herself	Season 1, Episode 2 Guest
2021	Nickelodeon's Unfiltered	Herself	Episode: "Poppin' Starfish & Rockin' Roaches!"
2021	Saturday Night Live	Herself	Musical guest; Episode: "Simu Liu/Saweetie"
2021	Sex: Unzipped	Herself	Host
2021	Respectfully Justin	Herself	Guest
2023	Bel-Air	Herself	Season 2, Episode 1
2023	Selling Sunset	Herself	Season 6, Episode 9
2023	Ladies First: A Story of Women in Hip-Hop	Herself	4 episodes
2023	That's My Jam	Herself/Guest	Along with Keke Palmer, Joel McHale, will.i.am
2024	The Voice	Herself/Guest mentor	Guest mentor to Team Dan + Shay on season 25
2024	The Jennifer Hudson Show	Herself	Episode: “Saweetie”
2024	Velma	Herself (voice)	Episode: “This Halloween Need to Be More Special!”
2024	Dinner Time Live with David Chang	Herself/Guest	Episode: "The Epic Combos Menu"
2024	A Great Day with J Balvin	Herself	Episode: “Net Gains with Saweetie”
2024	K-Pops!	Herself	Cameo appearance
2025	Idiotka	Candy	

== Awards and nominations ==
Year	Organization	Work	Award	Results	Ref.
2020	MTV Video Music Awards	"Tap In"	Song of Summer	Nominated	
2020	People's Choice Awards	Herself	The New Artist of 2020	Nominated	
2020	BET Awards	Herself	Best Female Hip Hop Artist	Nominated	
2021	BET Awards	Herself	Best Female Hip Hop Artist	Nominated	
2021	Billboard Music Awards	Herself	Top Rap Female Artist	Nominated	
2021	MTV Video Music Awards	Herself	Best New Artist	Nominated	
2021	MTV Video Music Awards	"Best Friend" (featuring Doja Cat)	Best Art Direction	Won	
2021	UK Music Video Awards	"Fast (Motion)"	Best Pop Video – International	Nominated	
2021	BET Hip Hop Awards	Herself	Hustler of the Year	Won	
2021	BET Hip Hop Awards	"Best Friend" (featuring Doja Cat)	Best Hip-Hop Video	Nominated	
2021	MTV Europe Music Awards	Herself	Best New	Won	
2021	American Music Awards	Herself	Favourite Female Hip-Hop Artist	Nominated	
2021	People's Choice Awards	Herself	Female Artist of the Year	Nominated	
2021	People's Choice Awards	"Best Friend" (featuring Doja Cat)	Collaboration Song of the Year	Nominated	
2022	Grammy Awards	"Best Friend" (featuring Doja Cat)	Best Rap Song	Nominated	
2022	Grammy Awards	Herself	Best New Artist	Nominated	
2022	Kids' Choice Awards	Herself	Favorite Breakthrough Artist	Nominated	
2022	NAACP Image Awards	Herself	Outstanding New Artist	Won	
2022	NAACP Image Awards	"Best Friend"	Outstanding Music Video/Visual Album	Nominated	
2022	NAACP Image Awards	"Best Friend"	Outstanding Hiphop/Rap Song	Nominated	
