= Variety Hitmakers Awards =

Award given to popular songs

Variety's Hitmakers Awards
- Most recent: 9th Variety Hitmakers Awards
- RAYE, Variety's Hitmaker of 2026
- Awarded for: the year's most consumed songs
- Country: United States
- Presented by: Variety
- First award: 2017
- Website: variety.com

The Variety Hitmakers Awards is an annual event held by Variety. It is the publication's first music franchise, according to the magazine, it was established to recognize "the artists, labels, executives, producers, publishers, sound mixers, engineers, managers and marketing mavens behind the year’s most consumed songs."

According the magazine: "The music editors at Variety analyze each song’s merits — including structure, melody/hook, lyrics, cultural relevance and commercial performance — and dissect who played a role in bringing the song to life, from idea to writing to production to execution and out to the marketplace." It was also confirmed by the magazine that all data used to decide the Hitmakers, comes from Luminate. The first award was presented in 2017, and the most recent event took place on December 6, 2025.

The next event will take place on December 5, 2026.

Annual honorees includes:

== Variety's Hitmaker of the Year Award ==
Sabrina Carpenter was named Variety's Hitmaker of 2025

The Variety's Hitmaker of the Year Award goes to an artist that had significant recognition through the year thanks to their role as a producer, writer, or performance on "highly successful songs and albums that chart well and gain widespread recognition."

The award was first given to Kendrick Lamar in 2017. In 2021, the award was presented as the hitmaker of tomorrow, and went to Jack Harlow. In 2022, the award was presented to more than one artist with Elton John and Dua Lipa both getting recognition for their collaborative hit single "Cold Heart". In 2024, Charli XCX was awarded for being "indisputably one of the greatest pop innovators of the 21st century". In 2025, the award was given to Sabrina Carpenter in recognition to the commercial success of her seventh studio album, Man's Best Friend, and its lead single "Manchild".

The most recent winner is RAYE who was named Variety's Hitmaker of 2026, following the critical acclaim and success of her sophomore studio album This Music May Contain Hope, and her consistent advocacy for songwriters and independent artists. She also makes history as the first independent artist to receive the accolade.

- 2017: Kendrick Lamar
- 2018: Adam Levine
- 2019: Billie Eilish
- 2020: Harry Styles
- 2021: Jack Harlow (presented as Hitmaker of Tomorrow)
- 2022: Elton John and Dua Lipa
- 2023: SZA
- 2024: Charli XCX
- 2025: Sabrina Carpenter
- 2026: RAYE

== Variety's Decade Award ==
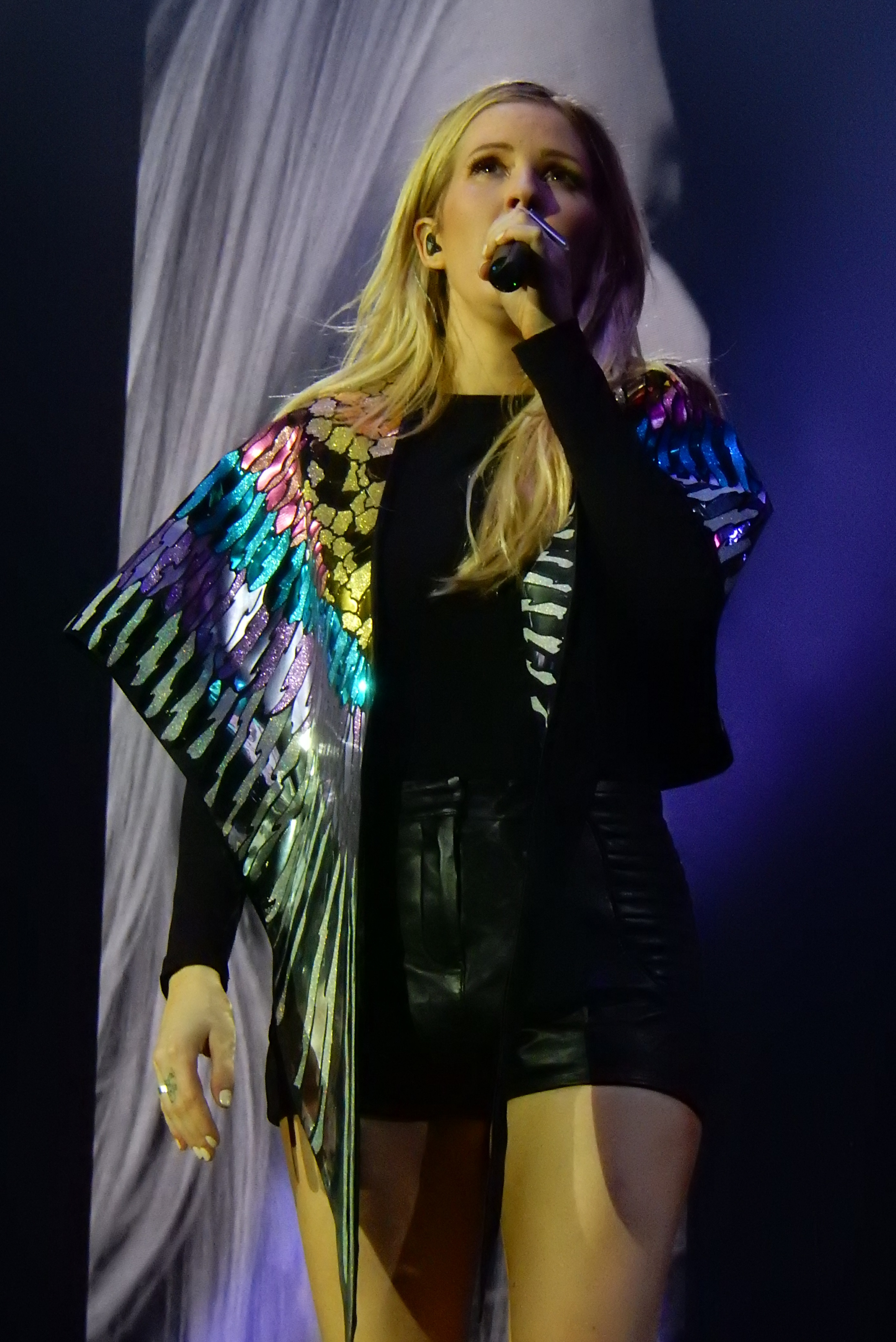
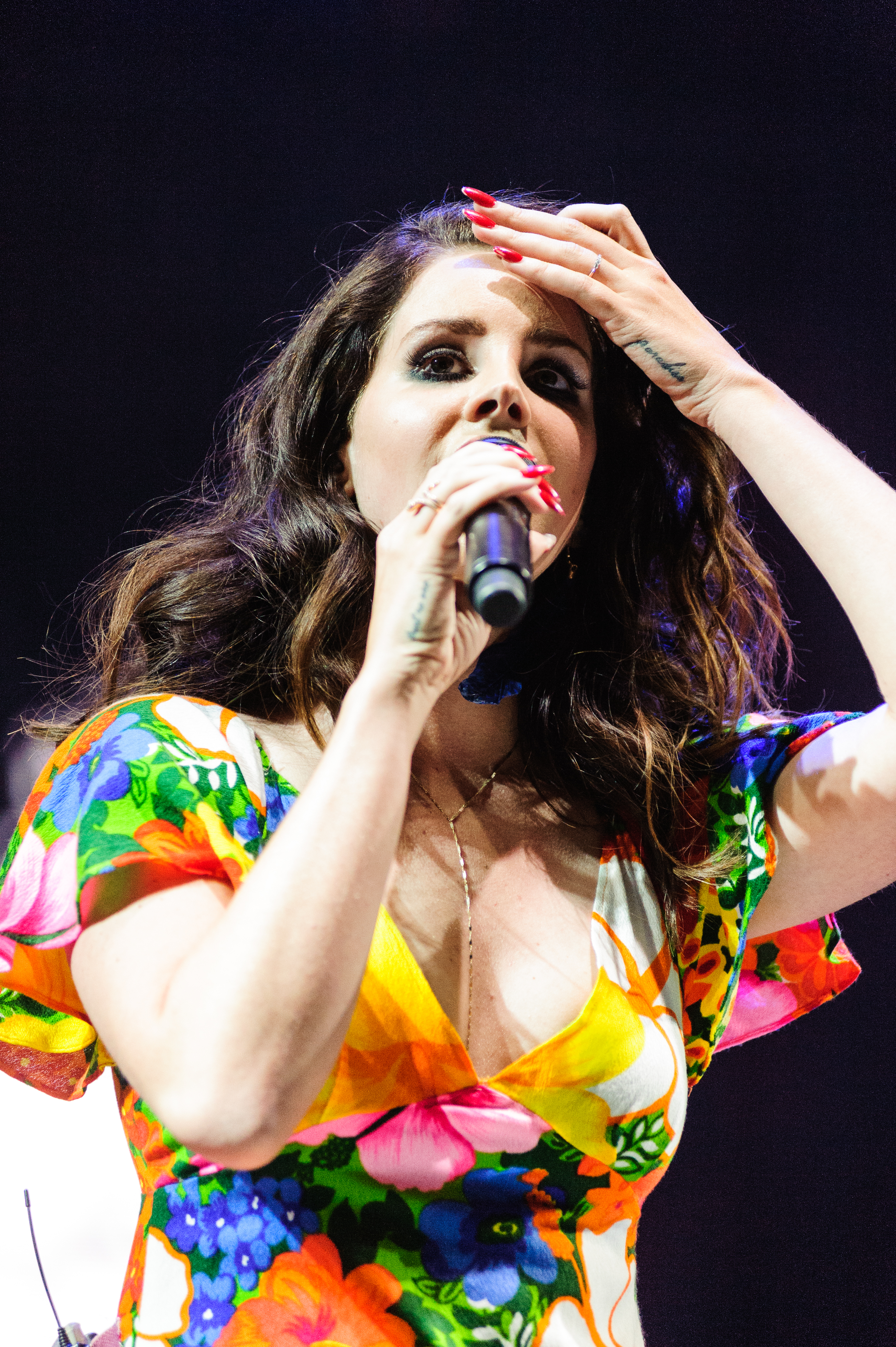
Ellie Goulding and Lana Del Rey have been honored with Variety's Decade Award in 2019 and 2021, respectively.

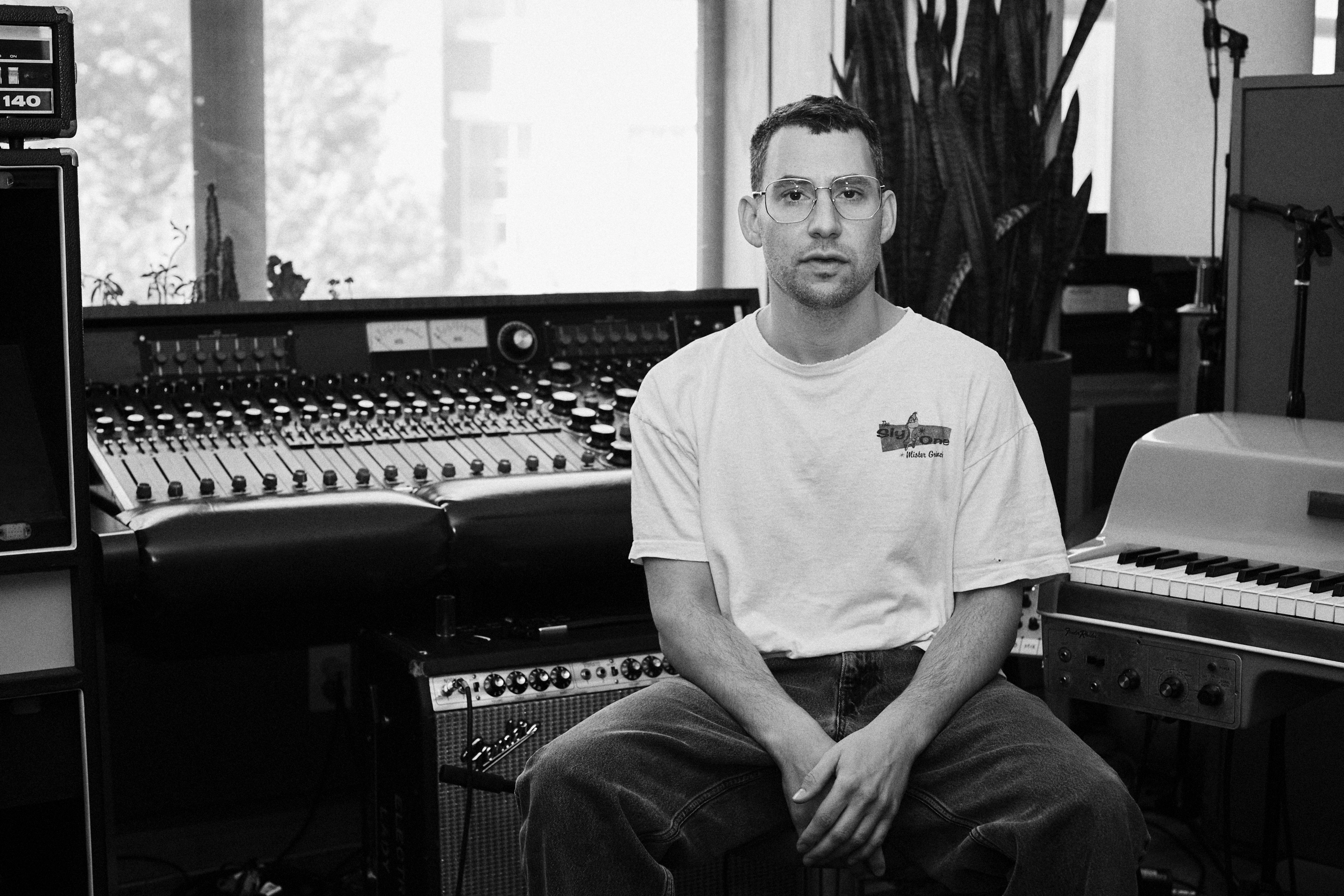
Jack Antonoff is the only producer to be awarded with Variety's Decade Award in 2024.

Variety's Decade Award recognizes ten years of work of an individual in the music industry. The award was first given to Ellie Goulding who was awarded in 2019 for ten years of "undeniable hits". In 2021, Lana Del Rey became the second artist to be honored with the decade award in recognition to her artistry and influence. In 2024, Jack Antonoff was presented with Variety's Producer of the Decade Award in recognition of his ten years of work as a producer. In 2025, American record label, Big Loud was presented with Variety's Platinum Decade Award.

Artists

- 2019: Ellie Goulding — in recognition of a staying power decade of undeniable hits.
- 2021: Lana Del Rey — in recognition as one of the most influential singer-songwriters of the 21st century.

Producers

- 2024: Jack Antonoff — in recognition of a decade of "extensively" work as a producer of many artists.

Labels

- 2025: Big Loud (Seth England, Joey Moi, Craig Wiseman) — in recognition of a decade of "blockbuster success" with their roster of country artists.

== Variety's Producer of the Year Award ==
Variety's Producer of the Year Award was first given to Noah "40" Shebib for his work with Canadian rapper Drake in 2018. The most recent winners are Sounwave, Mustard, and Jack Antonoff for their works with American rapper Kendrick Lamar over the last year.

- 2018: Noah “40” Shebib
- 2019: Louis Bell
- 2020: Mustard
- 2021: Mike Dean
- 2022: Ricky Reed
- 2023: Metro Boomin
- 2024: Daniel Nigro — for being "the key collaborator in the albums by two of the year's most culture-shifting artists" Guts by Olivia Rodrigo, and The Rise and Fall of a Midwest Princess by Chappell Roan.
- 2025: Sounwave, Mustard and Jack Antonoff — for their key roles in Kendrick Lamar's "vital and culture-shifting" blockbuster album GNX and his hit single "Not Like Us".

== Variety's Songwriter of the Year Award ==
Variety's Songwriter of the Year Award was first given to Bebe Rexha in 2018. The most recent winner is Olivia Rodrigo, who also makes history as the first artist to be honored with the award more than once in 2026.

- 2018: Bebe Rexha — for her contributions to the music industry as a songwriter, which includes her smash hit "Meant to Be".
- 2019: Ryan Tedder — for his work as a producer-writer in the number-one single "Sucker", and for helping develop NBC’s songwriting competition series Songland.
- 2020: Lewis Capaldi — for crafting relatable and vulnerable songs that connected with many listeners with the hits "Someone You Loved" and "Before You Go".
- 2021: Olivia Rodrigo — for the success of her chart-topping debut single "Drivers License".
- 2022: Kid Harpoon and Tyler Johnson — for their joint work as songwriters on Harry Styles' blockbuster album Harry’s House, and its lead single "As It Was".
- 2023: Ashley Gorley — for dominanting country radio charts with his contributions on five number-one hits for Morgan Wallen, including "Last Night".
- 2024: Amy Allen — for co-writing every song on Sabrina Carpenter’s blockbuster album Short n’ Sweet, as well on hits by Tate McRae, Rosé and Bruno Mars, among others.
- 2025: Bruno Mars — for co-writing the global hit singles "APT." and "Die with a Smile".
- 2026: Olivia Rodrigo — for turning "heartbreak and growing pains into generational anthems" with her third studio album You Seem Pretty Sad for a Girl So in Love.

== Variety's Group of the Year Award ==
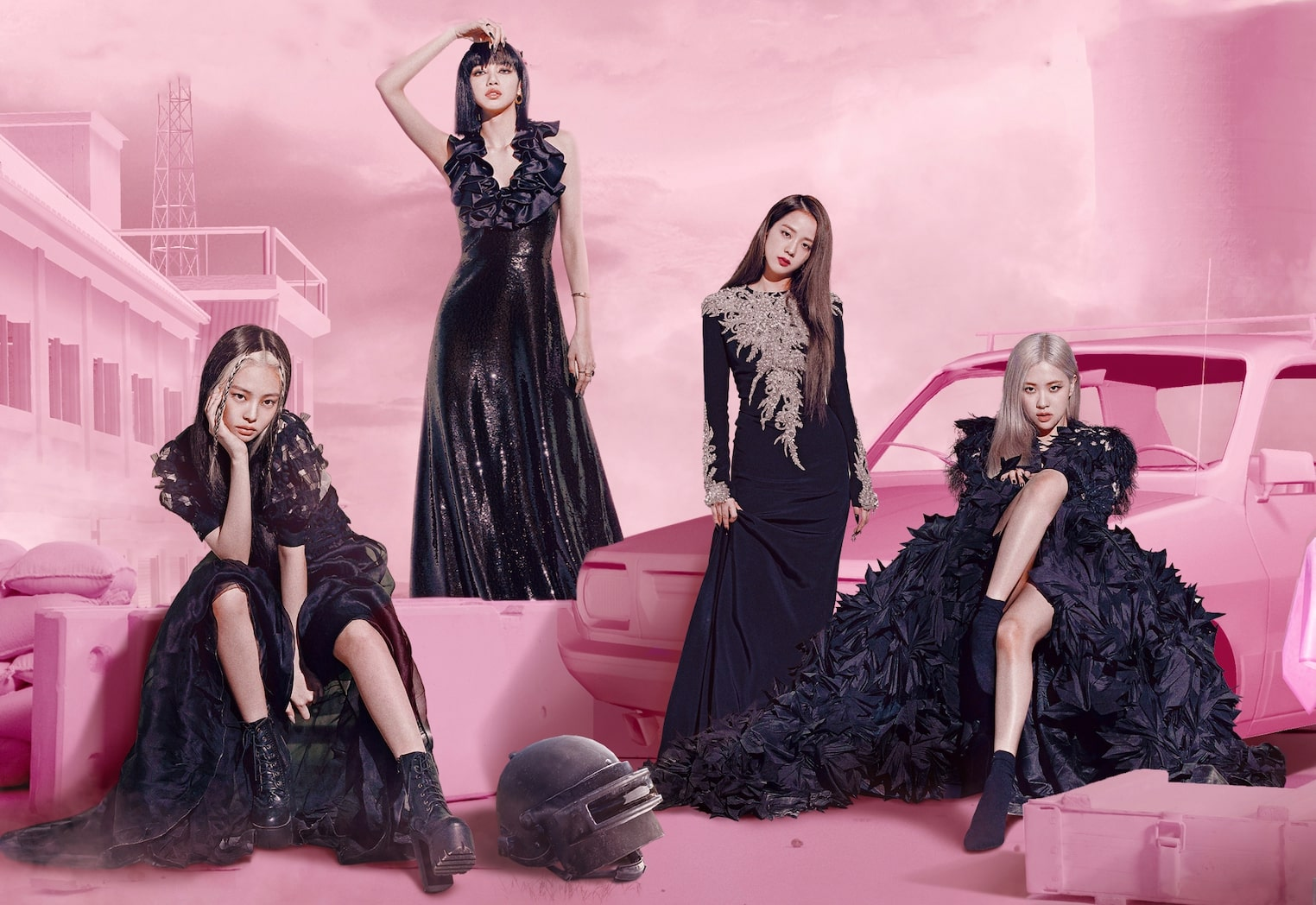
Blackpink, the first girl group to win Variety's Group of the Year Award in 2020

- 2018: Migos
- 2019: BTS
- 2020: Blackpink
- 2021: Glass Animals
- 2022: Imagine Dragons
- 2023: Boygenius
- 2026: Katseye

== Variety's Crossover Artist Award ==
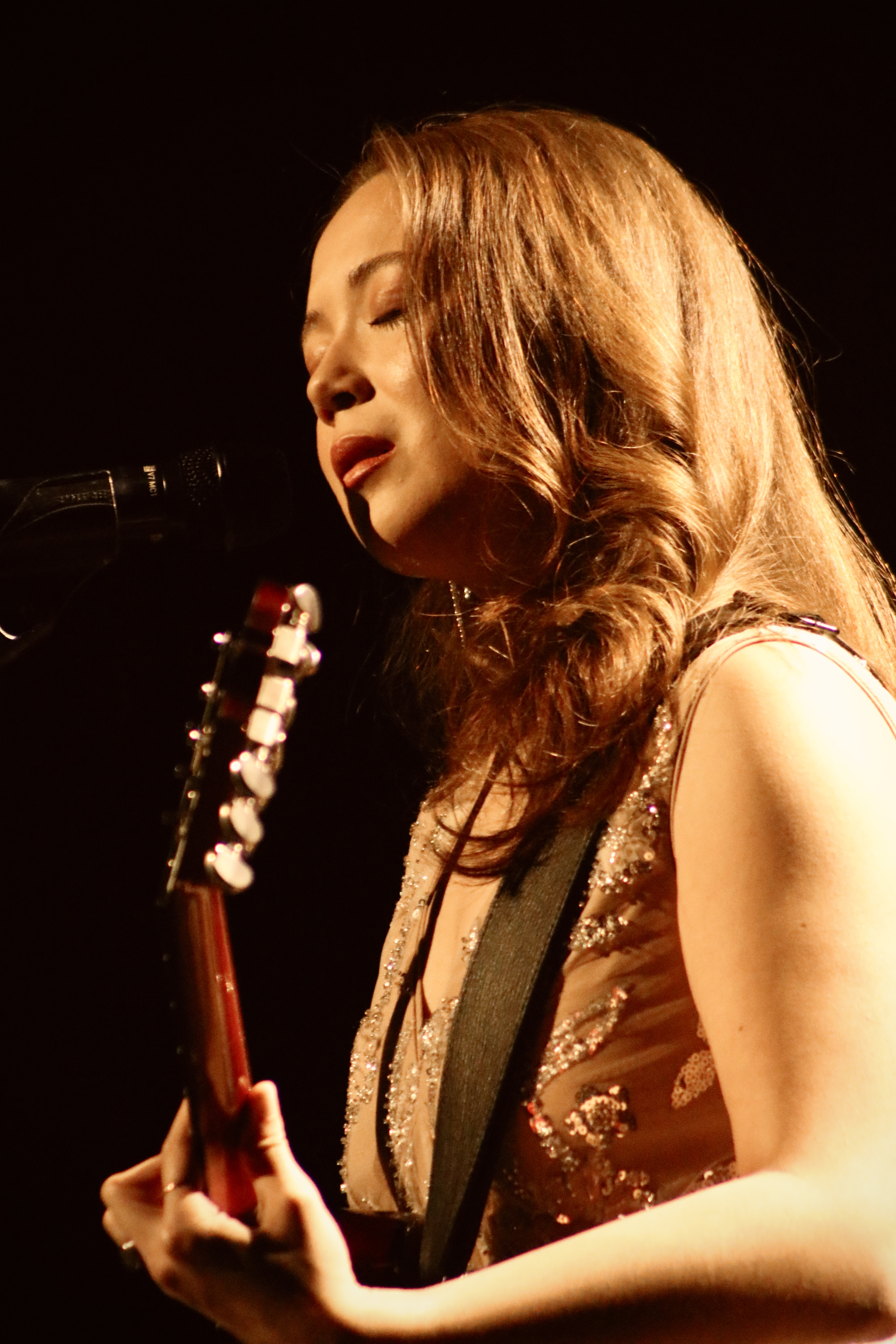
Variety's Crossover Artist of 2024, Laufey

- 2017: Hailee Steinfeld — for her crossover as an Oscar-nominated actress to a multi-platinum selling singer with the hit singles "Most Girls" and "Starving".
- 2019: Swae Lee — for his featuring work on the hit singles "Sunflower" with Post Malone, "Crave" with Madonna, and "Close to Me" with Ellie Goulding and Diplo.
- 2020: Maren Morris — for finding success between country and pop music with her hit single "The Bones".
- 2021: Kali Uchis — for connecting with Spanish and English-speaking fans globally with her hit "Telepatía".
- 2024: Laufey — for "bridging" the gap between traditional jazz and contemporary pop music.

== Variety's Record of the Year ==
- 2020: The Weeknd — "Blinding Lights"
- 2021: BTS — "Butter"
- 2022: Lizzo — "About Damn Time"

== Variety's Label of the Year Award ==
- 2017: Republic Records
- 2019: Republic Records
- 2021: Columbia Records
- 2022: Atlantic Records
- 2023: Republic Records
- 2024: REPUBLIC Corps Collective
- 2025: Republic Records

== Variety's Breakthrough Artist of the Year Award ==
Slayyyter, Variety's Breakthrough Artist of 2026

- 2018: Dua Lipa
- 2019: Megan Thee Stallion
- 2020: Roddy Ricch
- 2021: Polo G (presented as Rising Star Award)
- 2022: Latto
- 2023: Sabrina Carpenter (presented as Rising Star Award)
- 2024: Shaboozey and Benson Boone (presented as Newcomers Award)
- 2025: Alex Warren
- 2026: Slayyyter

== Variety's Innovators of the Year Award ==
- 2018: Kevin "Coach K" Lee and Pierre "Pee" Thomas of Quality Control.
- 2021: Lil Nas X
- 2022: Kim Petras and Sam Smith

== Variety's Changemaker of the Year Award ==
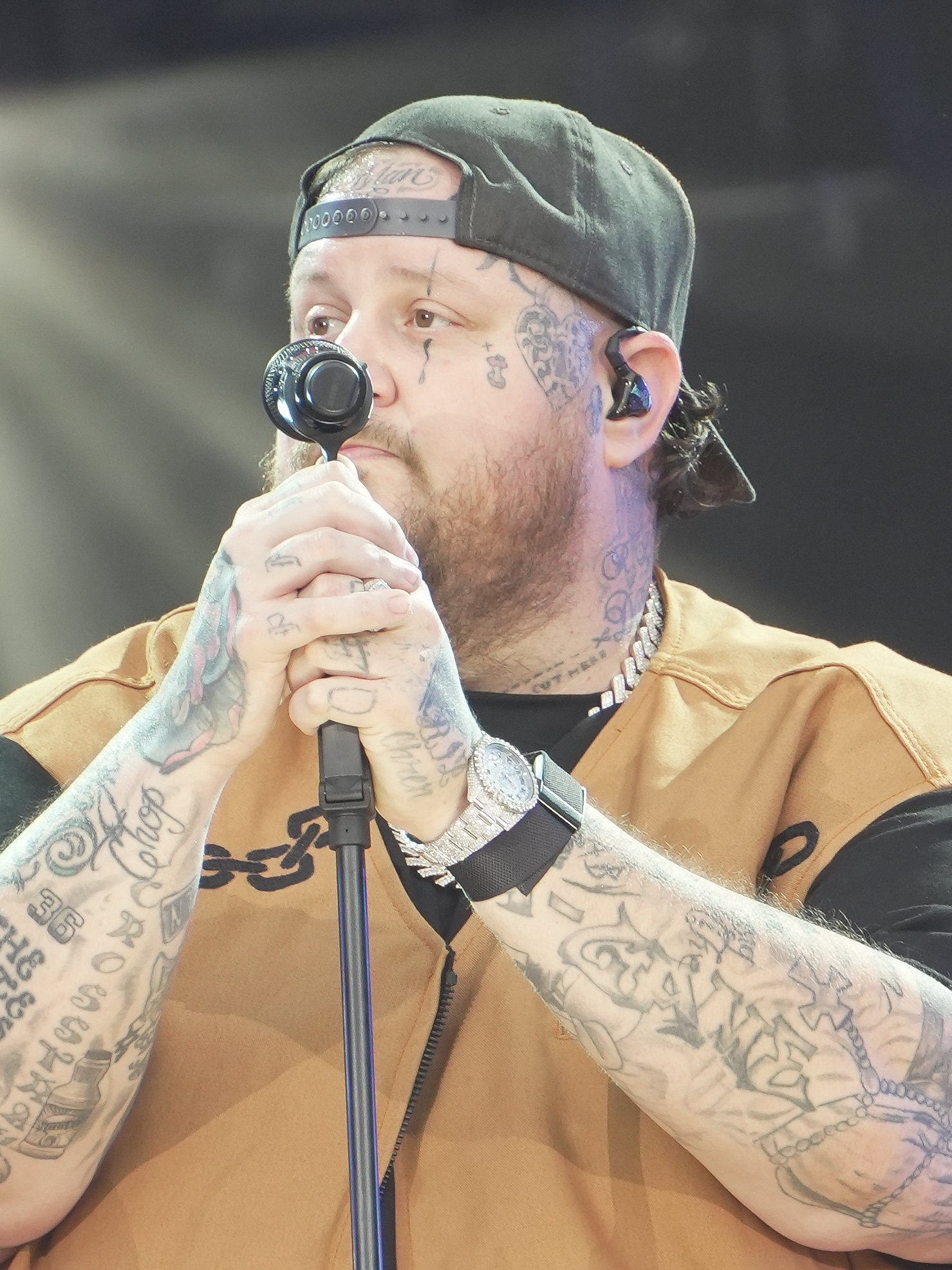
Variety's Changemaker of 2024, Jelly Roll

- 2023: Maren Morris — for her efforts against transphobia, homophobia and other forms of discrimination in the country music industry.
- 2024: Jelly Roll — for his work with the incarcerated and addiction recovery.

== Variety's Collaborator of the Year Award ==
- 2021: Normani
- 2022: Future
- 2023: Eslabon Armado & Peso Pluma

== Variety's Storyteller of the Year Award ==
- 2023: Olivia Rodrigo — for her approach to storytelling on her sophomore studio album, Guts.
- 2024: Lainey Wilson — for her personal and singular storytelling on her third major-label album, Whirlwind.
- 2025: Megan Moroney — for her storytelling on her "stellar" album Am I Okay?

== Variety's Hook of the Year Award ==
- 2019: YG — "Go Loko" (feat. Tyga and Jon Z)
- 2020: The Weeknd — "Blinding Lights"

== Variety's Film Song of the Year ==
- 2021: Billie Eilish and Finneas — "No Time to Die"
- 2022: Selena Gomez — "My Mind & Me"
- 2023: Billie Eilish and Finneas — "What Was I Made For?"

== Variety's Soundtrack of the Year Award ==
- 2023: Mark Ronson — for his work on the 2023 film Barbie.
- 2025: Buddy Guy (presented as Iconic Collaboration in Film Award) — for his work on the 2025 film Sinners.

== Variety's Sync of the Year Award ==
- 2019: Shaed — "Trampoline"
- 2021: Walker Hayes — "Fancy Like"
- 2022: Kate Bush — "Running Up That Hill"

== Variety's Triple Threat Award ==
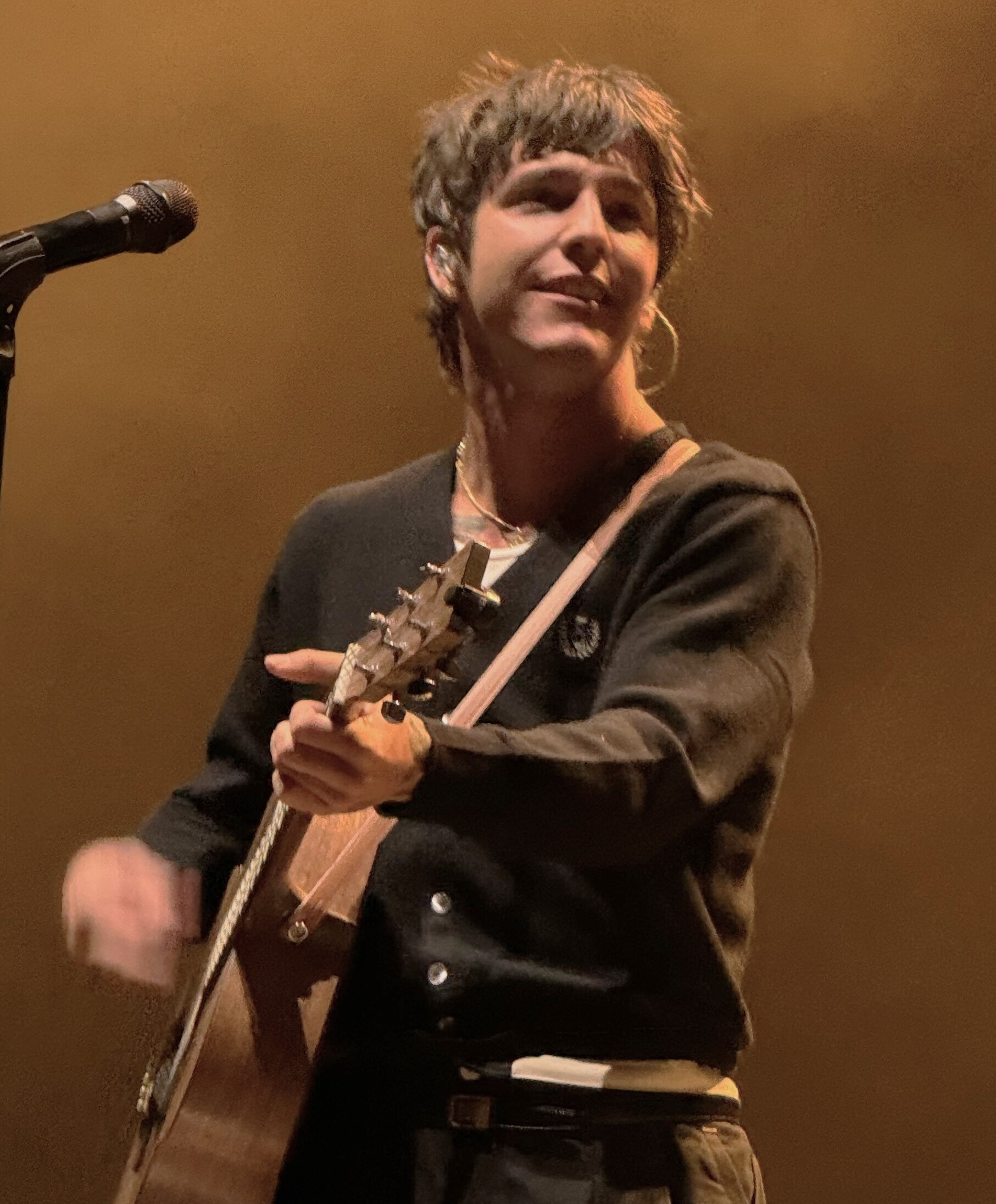
Variety's Triple Threat of 2025, Role Model

- 2023: Victoria Monét — for her role as a singer, songwriter and performer.
- 2024: Raye — for her work as an artist and songwriter, and her outspoken efforts in support of the songwriting community.
- 2025: Role Model — for his achievements in music and film.

== Variety's Manager of the Year Award ==
- 2018: Dre London
- 2019: Jason Owen
- 2020: Wassim “Sal” Slaiby
- 2021: Austin Rosen
- 2022: Ebonie Ward

== Variety's Executive of the Year Award ==
- 2018: John Janick, Chief of Interscope Records
- 2019: Jody Gerson, CEO/Global Chairman of Universal Music Publishing Group
- 2020: Ron Perry, CEO/Chairman for Columbia Records
- 2021: Max Lousada, CEO for Warner Recorded Music
- 2022: Jesse Collins, CEO, Jesse Collins Entertainment
- 2024: Aaron Bay-Schuck and Tom Corson, CEOs of Warner Records
- 2025: Elliot Grainge, CEO of Atlantic Music Group

== Variety's A&R of the Year Award ==
- 2021: Wendy Goldstein
- 2022: Kara DioGuardi

== Variety's The Future Is Female Award ==
- 2021: City Girls — for leading a major culture shift in hip-hop where "women not only have a seat at the table but are actually running things".
- 2025: Addison Rae, Elvira Anderfjärd, and Luka Kloser — for "breaking the glass ceiling" by making, Rae's critical acclaimed debut album Addison, entirely themselves.

== Variety's Icon Award ==
- 2022: Omar Apollo (presented as TikTok's Future Icon Award) — for his "trend-inspiring" power ballad "Evergreen (You Didn’t Deserve Me at All)".
- 2026: Hilary Duff (presented as Generational Icon Award) — for her "triumphant" return to music with her album Luck... or Something, and her sold-out Lucky Me Tour.

== Variety's Hip-Hop Disruptor Award ==
- 2024: Doechii — for emerging as one of the most "electrifying" new talents in the hip-hop/R&B scene in years.
- 2025: BigXthaPlug — for his "groundbreaking" fusion of music genres.

== Variety's Humanitarian of the Year Award ==
- 2024: Quavo — for his work in gun control.
- 2025: Fuerza Regida — for their humanitarian efforts, among the Latino community, as well helping on the wildfire relief in L.A.

== Other honorees ==
Awards that have been presented only once so far:

Variety's Mediabase PowerPlaylist Award

- 2017: DJ Khaled

Variety's Hitbreaker of the Year Award

- 2021: Steven Victor

Variety's Composer of the Year Award

- 2021: Hans Zimmer

Variety's Interactive Music in Media Award

- 2025: Riot Games

Variety's Music Education and Advocacy Leadership Award

- 2023: Grammy Museum President and CEO Michael Sticka

Variety's Trailblazer Award

- 2024: Young Miko

Variety's Next Gen Award

- 2024: Grace Bowers

Variety's International Achievement in Music Award

- 2024: Yoshiki

Variety's Powerhouse of the Year Award

- 2025: Tate McRae

Variety's Anti-Hit Hitmakers of the Year Award

- 2025: The Marías

Variety's Living Legend Award

- 2025: Buddy Guy

Variety's KPop Demon Hitmakers of the Year Award

- 2025: Ejae, Audrey Nuna and Rei Ami, the singing voices of Huntrix

Variety's Global Hitmaker of the Year Award

- 2025: Rosé — for her "smash" debut album Rosie, and her single, "Apt.", both released in 2024.

Variety's Visionary Voice Award

- 2026: Sienna Spiro

Variety's Hitmakers Masterpiece of the Decade Award

- 2026: Rosalía — for her "groundbreaking" fourth studio album Lux.

== The Hitmakers ==
To make their annual Hitmakers list, the Variety's editors, use BuzzAngle data for the most-consumed songs of year, based on audio sales and streams, video plays, radio spins and Shazam tags. The editors then conferred with top executives and creatives from across the music business to find the players whose input was most vital to those songs. They included songwriters, producers, publishers, A&R and promotion executives, along with managers and key influencers — the people behind the scenes who make and break the hits.

Variety's 2017 Hitmakers	Variety's 2018 Hitmakers	Variety's 2019 Hitmakers
Alex Da Kid; Jack Antonoff; Noonie Bao and Linus Wiklund; Steve Mac and Johnny McDaid; Louis Bell; Benny Blanco; Cirkut; Frank Dukes; Erika Ender; Philip Lawrence and Brody Brown; Metro Boomin; Jason “Poo Bear” Boyd; Mike Will Made It; Nana Rogues; Starrah; The Stereotypes; Ali Tamposi, Andrew Watt, and Brian Lee; Julia Michaels and Justin Tranter; Andres Torres and Mauricio Rengifo; Adam Alpert; Tunji Balogun; Geo Bivins; Ben Cook and Ed Howard; Ian Cripps; Andrea Ganis and Juliette Jones; Wendy Goldstein, Rob Stevenson, and Tyler Arnold; Joel Klaiman; Michael Kyser; Lee Leipsner; Nick Petropoulos; Benny Pough, Sujit Kundu, Traci Adams, and Sandra Afloarei; Noah Preston; Brenda Romano; Rodney Shealey; Sickamore and David Stromberg; Manny Smith; Gary Spangler, Mike Horton, and Jim Roppo; Charlie Walk; Ron Perry; Katie Vinten; Jay Brown and Lenny Santiago; Future the Prince; Kevin “Coach K” Lee; Wassim “Sal” Slaiby; Tuma Basa (Spotify's Head of Hip-Hop); Brad Belanger, Zach Crowell, Shane McAnally, Josh Osborne and Greg Marella; Steve Blatter, SiriusXM Senior VP/GM of Music Programming; Zane Lowe, Apple Music’s Beats 1 Radio; Paul Tollett, Goldenvoice CEO; Tom Poleman, iHeartmedia Chief Programming Officer; Steve Boom, VP Amazon Music	Sarah Aarons; Alex Da Kid; Benny Blanco; BlaqNmilD; Louis Bell; Boi-1da; Blake Anthony “Shy” Carter; John Cunningham; Frank Dukes; Pardison Fontaine; David Garcia; J Kash; Tay Keith; Matt McGinn; The Monsters & Strangerz; Murda Beatz; OG Parker and Deko; Rice N’ Peas; Noah “40” Shebib; Starrah; J White; Pharrell Williams; Joey Arbagey, Epic Records; Tyler Arnold, Republic Records; Tunji Balogun, RCA Records; Brooklyn Johnny & Darrale Jones; Jim Catino, Sony Music Nashville; Tizita Makuria, Artist Partner Group; Jean Nelson, Blueprint Group Records; Sickamore, Interscope Records; Manny Smith, Interscope Geffen A&M; Mr. Morgan; Rob Stevenson, Republic Records; Mike Caren; Ethiopia Habtemariam; Jimmy Harnen; Craig Kallman; Michael Kyser; Brad O’Donnell; Dennis Reese; Joe Riccitelli; Jim Roppo; Jacqueline Saturn; Seth England, Big Loud Management; Roger Gold, Gold Music Management; Adam Harrison, Career Artist Management; Kevin “Coach K” Lee and Pierre “Pee” Thomas; Lil Bibby, Grade A Productions; Adam Mersel, First Access Entertainment; Dre London, London Ent; Dave Rene; Solomon Sobande; Courtney Stewart; David Stromberg; Andrea Ganis & Deborah Urbont, Atlantic Records; Marni Halpern; Juliette Jones; Larry Khan; Lee L’Heureux; Greg Marella, Bill Evans & Dixie Tipton; John McMann; Brenda Romano; Rick Sackheim, Sandra Afloarei & Charlie Foster; Rick Sackheim, Traci Adams & Dontay Thompson, Epic Records; Sam Selolwane; Gary Spangler, David ‘Davey Dee’ Ingenloff & Mike Horton; Shani Gonzales; Amanda Hill; Shawn Holiday; Sam Taylor; Katy Wolaver; Manny Marroquin; Tony Maserati	Amy Allen; Benny Blanco; Tommy Brown; Cashmere Cat; Cirkut; Cook Classics; Mike Dean; Disclosure; Frank Dukes; Finneas; Charlie Handsome; Sam Hollander; Jonas Jeberg; Ilya; Jozzy; Ilsey Juber; Savan Kotecha; Madison Love; Victoria Monet; Jimmy Napes; Tayla Parx; Ricky Reed; Anthony Rossomando; Jake Sinclair; Stargate; Ali Tamposi; T-Minus; Taz Taylor & Nick Mira; Billy Walsh; Andrew Watt; Wheezy; Joey Arbagey, Epic Records; Tyler Arnold, Republic Records; Tunji Balogun, RCA Records; Ziggy Chareton, Island Records; Brandon Davis, Atlantic Records; Caroline “Baroline” Diaz; Edgar “Edd Grand” Machuca, Artist Partner Group; Dallas Martin, Atlantic Records; Rob Stevenson, Republic Records; Julian Swirsky, Republic Records; Evan Taubenfeld, Crush; Jeremy Vuernick, Capitol Music Group; Wendy Goldstein, Republic Records; Toby Andrews, Astralwerks; Mike Caren, Artist Partner Group; Ethiopia Habtemariam, Motown; Justin Lubliner, The Darkroom; Angie Pagano, Artist Partner Group; Jim Roppo, Republic Records; Ron Perry, Columbia Records; Dana Sano, Republic Records; Astrid Taylor, Mad Love Records and Friends Keep Secrets; Jason Aron and Anthony Li, Anti-Pop; Scooter Braun & Allison Kaye, SB Projects; Andrew Gertler, AG Artists; Roger Gold, Gold Music Management; Dre London, London Ent.; Kevin Beisler & Brandon Creed, Full Stop Management; Scott Nagelberg, Crush; Adam Leber & Gee Roberson, Maverick; Danny Rukasin & Brandon Goodman; Phil McIntyre, Philymack; Moe Shalizi, The Shalizi Group; Courtney Stewart, Right Hand Music Group; Juliette Jones, Atlantic Records; Larry Khan & Nino Cuccinello, Interscope; Geo Bivins, RCA Records; Bill Evans, Capitol Music Group; Andrea Ganis, Atlantic Records; Lori Giamela & Kevin Valentini; David ‘Davey Dee’ Ingenloff, Republic Records; Greg Marella, Capitol Music Group; Brenda Romano, Interscope; Ayelet Schiffman, Island; Gary Spangler, Republic Records; Dixie Tipton, Capitol Records; Shawn Holiday, Sony/ATV; Lillia Parsa, UMPG; Ryan Press, Warner Chappell; Casey Robison, Big Deal Music Group; Darryl Watts, Universal Music Publishing Group; Michael Alexander, Republic, Def Jam and Island; Matt Bernal, Republic Records; Jordan Blaugrund, RCA Records; Marleny Dominguez-Reyes & Donna Grynn, Republic Records; Mike Horton, Republic Records; Tim Hrycyshyn, Republic Records; Kevin Lipson, Republic Records; Kerri Mackar, Republic Records; Brooks Roach, Atlantic Records; Grace James, Atlantic Records; Joseph Carozza, Marisa Bianco, Beau Benton, Republic Records
Variety's Hitmakers 2020	Variety's Hitmakers 2021	Variety's Hitmakers 2022
[icon]	[icon]	[icon]
Variety's Hitmakers 2023	Variety's Hitmakers 2024	Variety's Hitmakers 2025
[icon]	[icon]	[icon]

== See also ==
- Variety (magazine)
- List of music awards
