= Billboard Women in Music =

American music award

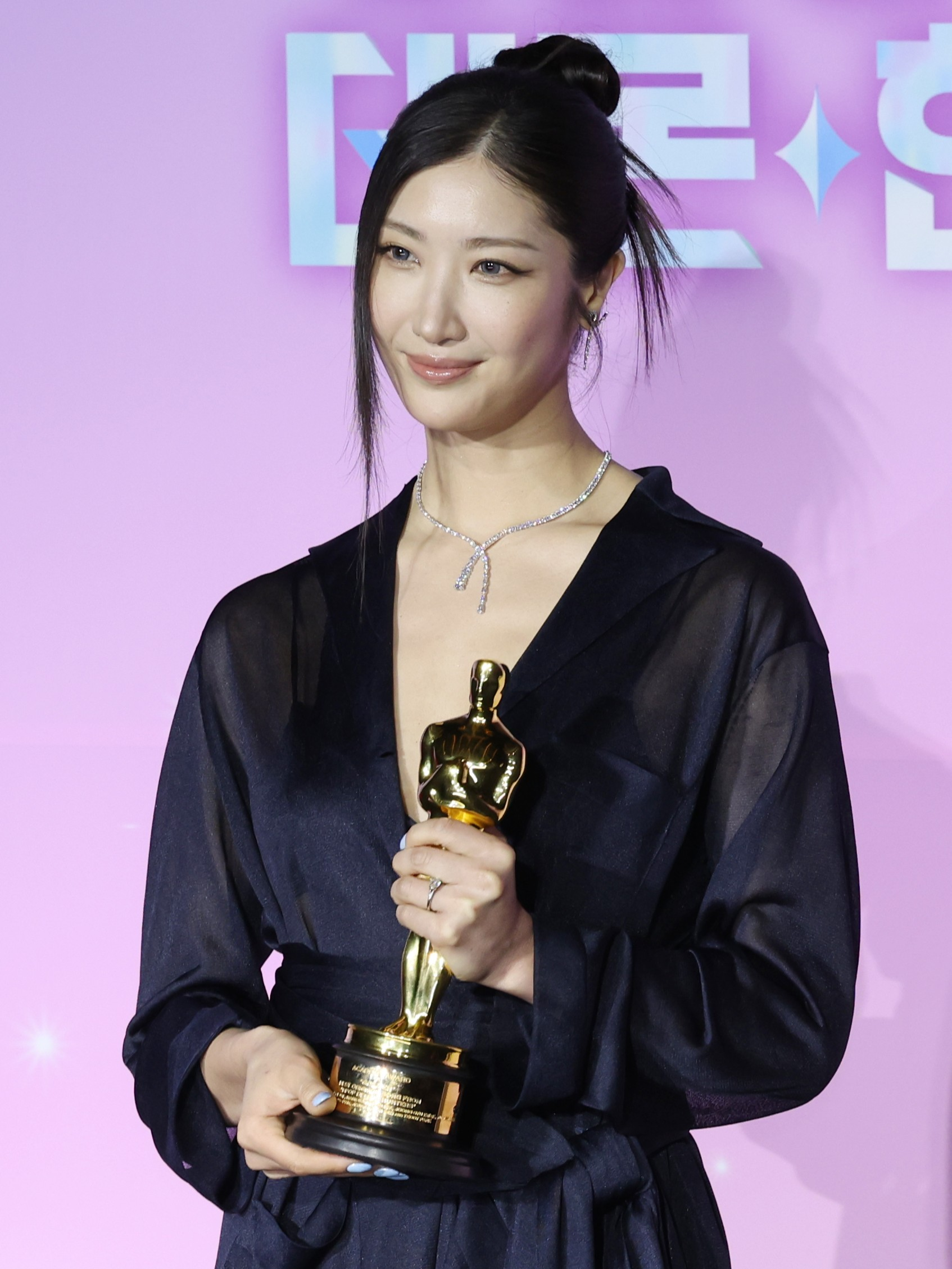
- Ejae, one of the Huntrix singing voices who are the most recent Woman of the Year honorees
- Awarded for: Contributions to the music industry by women
- Country: United States
- Presented by: Billboard
- First award: 2007
- Currently held by: Huntrix (2026 Woman of the Year)

Highlights
- Most wins: Taylor Swift (3)
- Website: billboardwomeninmusic.com

Billboard Women in Music is an annual event held by Billboard. Its main award is titled Woman of the Year, established to recognize women in the music industry who have made significant contributions to the business and who, through their work and continued success, inspire generations of women to take on increasing responsibilities within the field, according to the magazine.

Women in music include, women as composers, songwriters, instrumental performers, singers, conductors, music scholars, music educators, music critics/music journalists, and in other musical professions. A songwriter is an individual who writes the lyrics, melodies and chord progressions for songs, typically for a popular music genre such as pop, rock, or country music. A songwriter can also be called a composer, although the latter term tends to be mainly used for individuals from the classical music genre.

Since 2023, Billboard established the first Billboard Latin Women in Music, focusing exclusively on female artists of Latin music. Since 2024, it has expanded the award ceremony to the individual international territories in which the magazine is published.

== Woman of the Year Award ==
In 2007, Reba McEntire was honored with the Billboard's first Woman of the Year Award because of her success as a recording artist, contributions to the business, and leadership in embracing the changing music business. Every year since then, Billboard has honored a female artist with the award. Taylor Swift is the first and only woman to be honored more than once. Cardi B became the first rapper to receive the accolade. The most recent winners are Ejae, Audrey Nuna, and Rei Ami as the singing voices of Huntrix; this marked the first time a group had been collectively honored.

- 2007: Reba McEntire
- 2008: Ciara
- 2009: Beyoncé
- 2010: Fergie
- 2011: Taylor Swift
- 2012: Katy Perry
- 2013: Pink
- 2014: Taylor Swift
- 2015: Lady Gaga
- 2016: Madonna
- 2017: Selena Gomez
- 2018: Ariana Grande
- 2019: Billie Eilish
- 2020: Cardi B
- 2022: Olivia Rodrigo
- 2023: SZA
- 2024: Karol G
- 2025: Doechii
- 2026: Huntrix: Ejae, Audrey Nuna, Rei Ami

== Woman of the Decade Award ==
Although the awards began in 2007, in 2009 Billboard announced the Artists of Decade, ranking Beyoncé as Billboard’s Top Female Artist of the 2000s, without giving a formal award to the singer. At the end of the 2010s, Billboard honored Taylor Swift with the first-ever Woman of the Decade Award, for being one of the most accomplished musical artists of all time over the course of the 2010s.

- 2010s: Taylor Swift (2019)

== Rising Star Award ==
In 2008, Colbie Caillat was honored with Billboard's first Rising Star award because of "her ascent in the pop charts and the repercussion that her music caused." Every year since then, Billboard has honored a female artist with the award.

- 2008: Colbie Caillat
- 2009: Lady Gaga
- 2010: Jazmine Sullivan
- 2011: Nicki Minaj
- 2012: Carly Rae Jepsen
- 2013: Janelle Monáe
- 2014: Ariana Grande
- 2015: Kelsea Ballerini
- 2016: Halsey
- 2017: Grace VanderWaal
- 2018: Hayley Kiyoko
- 2019: Rosalía
- 2020: Chloe x Halle
- 2023: Doechii
- 2024: Victoria Monét
- 2025: Muni Long
- 2026: Mariah the Scientist

== Triple Threat Award ==
In 2010, Lea Michele was honored with Billboard's First-Ever Triple Threat Award because of her "excellence in performance across acting, singing and dancing."

- 2010: Lea Michele

== Rulebreaker Award ==
The Rulebreaker Award recognizes female artists who use their music and platform to defy traditional industry expectations and advance a powerful message for young people. Demi Lovato was the first to be honored with the award in 2015. (Note: This artist was given the award before they were publicly known as non-binary.)

- 2015: Demi Lovato
- 2016: Alessia Cara
- 2017: Kehlani
- 2018: SZA
- 2022: Karol G
- 2023: Lainey Wilson
- 2025: Megan Moroney

== Trailblazer Award ==
The Trailblazer award is awarded to a female artist, who acts as a music industry pioneer by using her platform to spotlight unheard voices and break ground for future generations of performers. Hayley Williams was the first to be honored for the award in 2014.

- 2014: Hayley Williams
- 2015: Lana Del Rey
- 2016: Kesha
- 2018: Janelle Monáe
- 2019: Brandi Carlile
- 2022: Phoebe Bridgers

== Group of the Year ==
- 2015: Fifth Harmony
- 2024: NewJeans
- 2025: aespa

== Chart-Topper Award ==
- 2014: Iggy Azalea
- 2015: Selena Gomez
- 2016: Meghan Trainor
- 2022: Summer Walker

== Icon Award ==
The Icon Award is given to a female artist of extraordinary accomplishment, who has made historic contributions to the industry and artistry.

- 2008: Debbie Harry
- 2014: Aretha Franklin
- 2016: Shania Twain
- 2017: Mary J. Blige
- 2018: Cyndi Lauper
- 2019: Alanis Morissette
- 2020: Jennifer Lopez
- 2022: Bonnie Raitt
- 2023: Ivy Queen
- 2024: Kylie Minogue
- 2025: Erykah Badu
- 2026: Thalía

== Impact Award ==
The Impact Award was given for the first time to Solange Knowles because she "uses her voice to empower and develop new leaders of tomorrow through their on-air persona, platform, and philanthropic efforts to inspire social change across the masses".

- 2017: Solange Knowles
- 2019: Alicia Keys
- 2020: Jessie Reyez
- 2021: H.E.R.
- 2023: Becky G
- 2024: Young Miko
- 2025: Tyla
- 2026: Kehlani

== Legend Award ==
The Legend Award was given for the first time to Loretta Lynn for her "historic contributions to the industry and artistry of American music, which has established her among the highest class of performers".

- 2015: Loretta Lynn

== Breakthrough Artist ==
- 2014: Idina Menzel
- 2015: Tori Kelly
- 2016: Maren Morris
- 2017: Camila Cabello
- 2023: Twice
- 2024: Tems
- 2025: Ángela Aguilar
- 2026: Zara Larsson

== Hitmaker Award ==
The Hitmaker Award is given to the songwriter whose compositions have significantly impacted culture.

- 2014: Charli XCX
- 2020: Dolly Parton
- 2024: Ice Spice
- 2025: Meghan Trainor
- 2026: Tate McRae

== Songwriter of the Year ==
- 2025: Gracie Abrams

== Innovator Award ==
The Innovator Award recognizes female artists who challenge musical convention, create positive change and contribute new ideas both in and outside of their creative work.

- 2015: Missy Elliott
- 2018: Kacey Musgraves
- 2026: Laufey

== Powerhouse Award ==
The Powerhouse Award is given to the act whose music dominated in their respected year through streaming, sales, and radio.

- 2014: Jessie J
- 2015: Brittany Howard
- 2016: Andra Day
- 2017: Kelly Clarkson
- 2019: Megan Thee Stallion
- 2020: Dua Lipa
- 2022: Doja Cat
- 2023: Latto
- 2024: Charli XCX
- 2025: GloRilla
- 2026: Ella Langley

== Game Changer Award ==
The Game Changer Award was given for the first time to Nicki Minaj, after becoming the first woman to notch 100 appearances on the Billboard Hot 100 chart.

- 2019: Nicki Minaj
- 2022: Saweetie

== Visionary Award ==
Lana Del Rey was awarded with the first visionary award in Billboard's history.

- 2023: Lana Del Rey
- 2024: Maren Morris
- 2026: Teyana Taylor

== Global Force Award ==
The Global Force Award was given to "singers, songwriters, instrumentalists and producers making groundbreaking contributions to the music industry" selected by Billboard publication around the world.

- 2024: Annalisa (Billboard Italy), María Becerra (Billboard Argentina), Sarah Geronimo (Billboard Philippines), Nini Nutsubidze (Billboard Georgia), Sherine (Billboard Arabia), Luísa Sonza (Billboard Brazil), Tia Ray (Billboard China)
- 2025: Jennie
- 2026: Bini (Billboard Philippines)

== Female executives and executives of the year ==
- 2015: Emma Banks, Carol Kinzel, Marlene Tsuchii, Sara Newkirk Simon, Samantha Kirby Yoh, Natalia Nastaskin, Marsha Vlasic, Caroline Yim, Marcie Allen, Jennifer Breithaupt, Debra Curtis, Sara Clemens, Tamara Hrivnak, Vivien Lewis, Heather Moosnick, Katie Schlosser, Monica Escobedo, Julie Gurovitsch, Lindsay Shookus, Debra Lee, Sarah Moll, Brittany Schreiber, Dawn Soler, Lia Vollack, Lori Badgett, Martha Henderson, Julie Boos, Mary Ann McCready, Michele Anthony, Candace Berry, Maria Fernandez, Wendy Goldstein, Julie Greenwald, Ethiopia Habtemariam, Allison Jones, Michelle Jubelirer, Cindy Mabe, Sylvia Rhone, Brenda Romano, Jacqueline Saturn, Julie Swidler, Dana DuFine, Maureen Ford, Amy Howe, Ali Harnell, Debra Rathwell, Kathy Willard, Lee Ann Callahan-Longo, Allison Kaye, Sarah Stennett, Ty Stiklorius, Elizabeth Matthews, Ann Sweeney, Kelli Turner, Jody Gerson, Jennifer Knoepfle, Carianne Marshall, Sas Metcalfe, Katie Vinten, Jess Besack, Sharon Dastur, Anya Grundmann
- 2016: Bozoma Saint John, Julie Greenwald, Camille Hackney
- 2017: Julie Greenwald
- 2018: Danielle Aguirre, Jacqueline Charlesworth, Susan Genco, and Dina LaPolt
- 2019: Desiree Perez
- 2020: Brianna Agyemang & Jamila Thomas
- 2021: Golnar Khosrowshahi

== Women of the Year in Music ==
- 2018 Women of the Year in Music

Latrice Burnett, Jennifer Hirsch-Davis - Island Records, Nicki Farag - Def Jam Records, Lori Feldman, Hildi Snodgrass - Warner Bros. Records, Maria Fernandez - Sony Music Latin, Andrea Ganis, Camille Hackney, Julliette Jones - Atlantic Records, Wendy Goldstein, Sharon Dastur, Katina Bynum, Kerri Mackar - Republic Records, Ethiopia Habtemariam - Motown Records, Allison Jones - Big Machine Label Group, Celine Joshua, Jennifer Baltimore, Elsa Yep - Universal Music Group, Michelle Jubelirer - Capitol Music Group, Sasha Junk - Kidz Bop, Cris Lacy, Taylor Lindsey - Warner Music Nashville, Cindy Mabe - Universal Music Nashville, Jennifer Mallory - Columbia Records, Sylvia Rhone, Traci Adams - Epic Records, Brenda Romano, Annie Lee, Nicole Wyskoarko, Erika Savage - Interscope Geffen A&M, Julie Swidler, Deirdre McDonald, Jennifer Fowler - Sony Music Entertainment, Carolyn Williams, Camille Yorrick - RCA Records, Desiree Perez - Roc Nation, Dia Simms - Combs Enterprises, Sarah Stennett - First Access Entertainment, Ama Walton - BMG, Dana DuFine, Debra Rathwell, Brooke Michael Kain - AEG, Amy Howe - Ticketmaster North America, Kate McMahon, Sara Winter-Banks - Messina Touring Group, Kathy Willard, Heather Parry, Maureen Ford, Tara Traub - Live Nation Entertainment, Emma Banks, Marlene Tsuchii, Carole Kinzel, Caroline Yim - Creative Artists Agency, Natalia Nastaskin, Cheryl Paglierani - United Talent Agency, Yves C. Pierre, Jacqueline Reynolds-Drumm - ICM Partners

== Producer of the Year ==
Rosalía was honored with the first ever Producer of the Year award in 2023.

- 2023: Rosalía
- 2024: PinkPantheress

== Mother of the Year Award ==
- 2025: Tina Knowles

== See also ==
- Billboard Canada Women in Music
- Billboard Italia Women in Music
- Billboard Latin Women in Music
- Billboard Philippines Women in Music
- WME Awards by Billboard Brasil
