= Future Starts Now =

2021 single by Kim Petras

Single by Kim Petras
- B-side: "Coconuts"
- Released: 27 August 2021
- Recorded: 2020
- Genre: Dance-pop
- Length: 4:39
- Label: Amigo; Republic
- Songwriters: Aaron Aguilar; Aaron Jennings; Alex Chapman; Kim Petras; Lukasz Gottwald; Vaughn Oliver
- Producers: Aaron Joseph; Dr. Luke; Vaughn Oliver

Kim Petras singles chronology
"Malibu" (2020)	"Future Starts Now" (2021)	"Coconuts" (2021)

Music video
- "Future Starts Now" on YouTube

"Future Starts Now" is a song by German singer Kim Petras. It was released on 27 August 2021 through Amigo and Republic Records, making it her debut single under a major label. It reached number 2 on US dance radio.

== Background ==
The song was first teased on Twitter by Petras, who said her album is "fully done" and the single would be released in the coming weeks. A performance of the upcoming single was played during her set at the 2021 Lollapalooza on 29 July 2021. After the performance, a small preview was released on Petras' own website with a link to pre-save the song on Spotify. On 16 August, an official announcement of the release date was posted on her social media, showing Petras surrounded by baguettes with a short clip of the song playing in the background.

The song was originally intended to be the lead single to Petras’ initial debut major-label studio album, Problématique, in 2022, but plans changed after the album got shelved in favour of Feed the Beast (2023). A revised version of the album was eventually released in spite of this on 18 September 2023. While "Coconuts" appeared on Feed The Beast alongside three other tracks intended for Problématique, "Future Starts Now" was excluded from both albums' track listings. In 2022, a vinyl single featuring "Future Starts Now" and its follow-up single, "Coconuts" was released to Urban Outfitters.

== Music video ==
The music video for "Future Starts Now" was released on 5 October 2021. The video features a shortened edit of the song.

== Charts ==
Chart performance for "Future Starts Now"
Chart (2021)	Peak position
Japan Hot Overseas (Billboard)	17
US Dance Airplay (Billboard)	2
