= East West Records =

American record label

- Parent company: Warner Music Group
- Founded: 1955; 71 years ago
- Genre: Various
- Location: New York, NY

East West Records is a record label formed in 1955, distributed and owned by Warner Music Group, headquartered in New York City.

== History ==
After its creation in 1955 by Atlantic Records, the label had its first hit with the Kingsmen's "Week End".

In 1990, Atlantic revamped the imprint as EastWest Records America, appointing Sylvia Rhone as President & CEO. Under Rhone's leadership, EastWest Records America shot to mega success with several multi-platinum artists such as En Vogue, Pantera, Adina Howard, Gerald Levert, AC/DC, The Rembrandts, Dream Theater, Missy Elliott and MC Lyte. UK artists on the EastWest label included The Beloved, Tanita Tikaram, Chris Rea, Billy Mackenzie (as Associates) and Simply Red. EastWest also distributed imprints, such as Interscope Records, Motor Jams Records, Mecca Don Records, and The Gold Mind Inc.

In 2005, WMG reactivated the East West label, which marketed and distributed rock music. East West operated under Warner's Alternative Distribution Alliance, the successor to Independent Label Group.

East West Records was revived in the UK in 2014 under the direction of Max Lousada, then Chairman & CEO, Warner Music UK.

=== 2024 – present ===
In 2024, Eric Wong was named President, East West Records & Head of Global A&R, Warner Recorded Music, reporting directly to WMG's CEO, Robert Kyncl.

Wong leads East West Records, a storied name in WMG history, which now serves as a connector across the company's global ecosystem – identifying local talents with global potential and accelerating their pathway to global success. Wong will also help sign and develop artists, while working across the company's roster of stars to foster collaborations and creative opportunities that build careers.

East West Records artists span WMG's global repertoire network, including WM Canada's Jade LeMac and Karan Aujla, WM China's Lay Zhang, WM France's Aya Nakamura and Charlotte Cardin, WM Germany's Robin Schulz, WM Denmark's Christopher, WM Italy's Ghali and Tony Boy, WM Taiwan's JOLIN and many more.

== The Bevonshire Label ==
The Bevonshire Label
- Parent company: East West Records
- Founder: Nightmare of You
- Genre: Rock
- Country of origin: US

The Bevonshire Label is a part of the East West Records family of labels.
