= Feed the Beast (Kim Petras album) =

Studio album by Kim Petras
- Released: 23 June 2023
- Recorded: 2020–2023
- Genres: Pop; dance
- Length: 40:36
- Labels: Amigo; Republic
- Producers: Aaron Joseph; Billboard; Blake Slatkin; Cirkut; Dr. Luke; Fat Max Gsus; Heavy Mellow; Housefly; Ian Kirkpatrick; Ilya; Isaiah Tejada; Jasper Harris; Jimmy Napes; The Monsters & Strangerz; Max Martin; Ojivolta; Omer Fedi; Rami Yacoub; RedOne; Rocco Did It Again!; Ryan OG; Sam Smith; Vaughn Oliver

Kim Petras chronology
The Summer I Couldn't Do Better (2022)	Feed the Beast (2023)	Problématique (2023)

Singles from Feed the Beast
- 1. "Alone" Released: 21 April 2023

Feed the Beast is the debut studio album by German singer Kim Petras. It was released on 23 June 2023 through Amigo and Republic Records. A pop and dance album, Feed the Beast explores themes of love, heartbreak and hedonism, filled with sex-positive lyrics on many of its songs. It was preceded by the lead single "Alone" with Nicki Minaj and features a collaboration with Banks. The album also includes the singles "Coconuts" and her Grammy Award-winning collaboration, "Unholy" with Sam Smith.

The record was met with mixed-to-positive reviews; some critics found the album entertaining and praised Petras's songwriting and vocal performances, while others found it to be safe and inferior to her previous releases.

To promote the album, Petras embarked on the Feed the Beast World Tour. Commercially, the album debuted and peaked at number 24 in her native Germany, while it became her first charting album in the United States and the United Kingdom.

== Background ==
On 3 August 2022, after having alluded to the release of her forthcoming originally planned debut studio album, Problématique for a year at that time, Petras confirmed that the album release was halted, ultimately putting her in "limbo". However, she approved fans to listen to leaks. On 22 September 2022, Petras released the highly anticipated "Unholy" with English singer Sam Smith. The song went on to reach number one in various countries, including on the United Kingdom Singles Chart and the United States Billboard Hot 100, and eventually earned both artists a Grammy Award for Best Pop Duo/Group Performance at the 65th Annual Grammy Awards.

Petras then released the singles "If Jesus Was a Rockstar" in November 2022 and "Brrr" in January 2023. On 21 April 2023, the singer released "Alone" with rapper Nicki Minaj. The song proved more successful than its two previous singles, having charted in five countries. While all singles were expected to appear on the album, "Alone" was officially announced as the lead single.

On 17 February 2023, the singer stated that an album that she had been working on "for three years" was ready to be released the next summer, sharing her excitement for people to hear the songs. On 26 February, the album was nearly finished. On 15 May 2023, Petras announced the album on her social media. A corresponding album poster depicts a noir photo of a "medieval-looking sword propped up against a large stone". Petras also shared posts of medieval imagery. In anticipation of the album, the news was celebrated as part of a live performance on NBC's Citi Concert series.

== Title and concept ==
"After that happened [the leak], my A&R [representative] Wendy Goldstein and I had a little meeting and she was like, 'Well, this stuff happens. It's life. Go and write more. Challenge yourself to the limit and go feed the beast.' And that's what I did, and so that's how the title came along."

— Petras on her album title for WWD Magazine

The album's title came after Petras had a meeting with her A&R Wendy Goldstein, following the leak of her then-planned debut album Problématique. She encouraged the singer to "write more and feed the beast", which inspired her to name the album with that title after their conversation. Petras also described the album as her most personal, with "vulnerable, real moments [for her]", being a departure from some of her previously released projects such as Turn Off the Light (2019) and Slut Pop (2022), where she played characters to fit their musical narrative.

According to Amazon Music, the album's concept was based on a "modern-day spin on the classic Greek tale Andromeda" with lyrics about "sacrificing every part of yourself to your biggest passion in life". The overall aesthetic features a medieval setting surrounded by rocks, a sword and chains, while the cover was shot by American photographer Luke Gilford.

== Composition ==
Feed the Beast is a pop and dance album, incorporating multiple sub-genres on its songs, such as Europop, house, hyperpop and disco. Many of the tracks were inspired by the music Petras listened to while growing up in Europe. Lyrically it was described by the singer as a personal album and explores themes of love, heartbreak and hedonism, with many sexual innuendos on its composition. Stephen Daw from Billboard compared music from Feed the Beast to Cascada and Basshunter music. Megan Graye and Ellie Muir from The Independent also compared it to Basshunter.

== Promotion ==
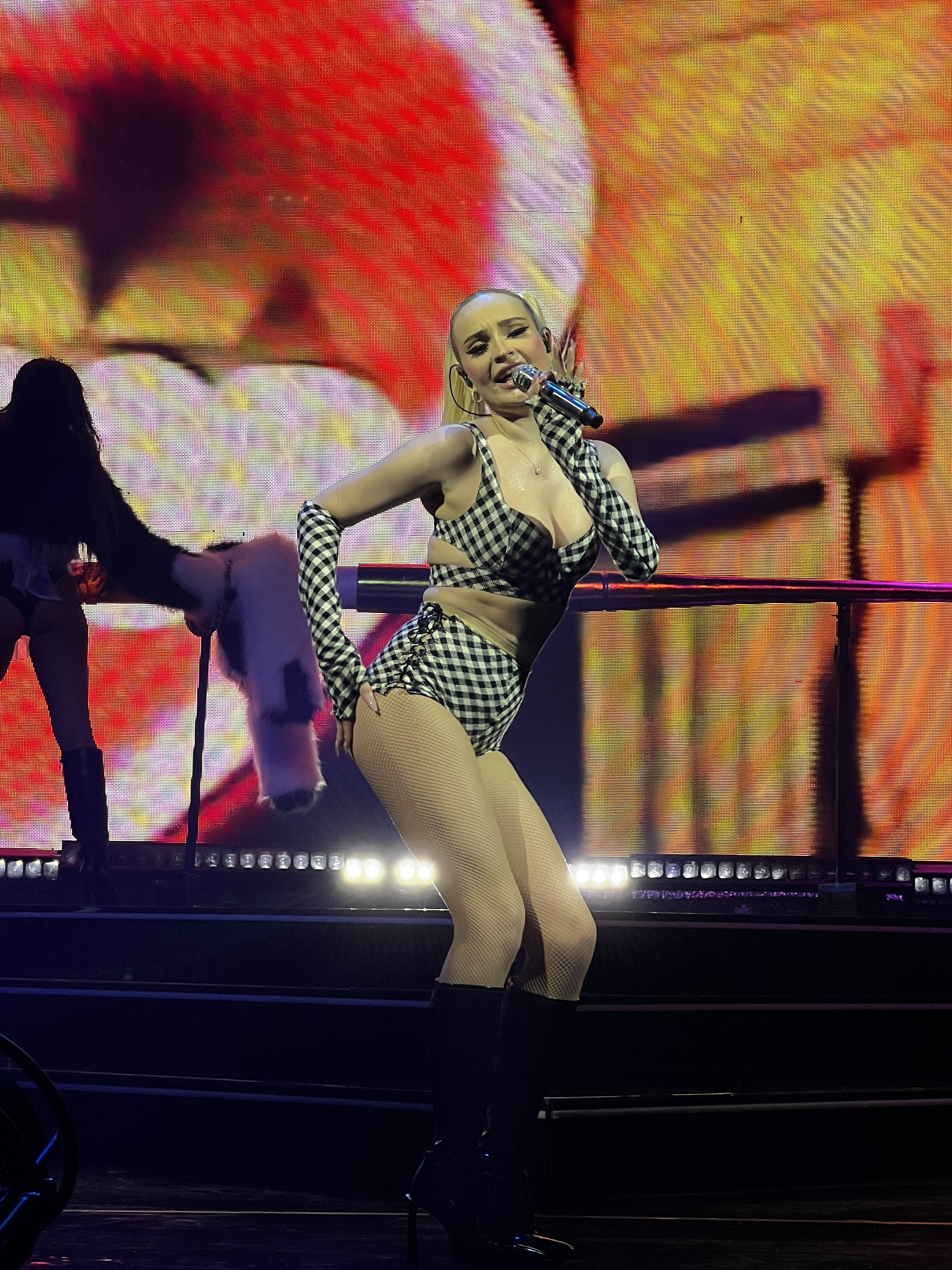
Petras performing on the Feed the Beast World Tour in 2024

=== Singles ===
The album's lead single "Alone" was released on 21 April 2023. It features guest vocals by rapper Nicki Minaj and peaked at number 55 on the US Billboard Hot 100, becoming Petras' second entry on the chart.

=== Other songs ===
Previously released single "Coconuts" and promotional single "Brrr" were ultimately included on the album's tracklist, while "Unholy", Petras's collaboration with Sam Smith, appears as a bonus track.

Following the release of the album, "King of Hearts" was planned to be pushed as the second single, according to Universal Music international press releases and Petras herself. Whilst a music video for the song was shot, it was not released, nor was the song sent to radio stations. However, it was promoted on Spotify playlists and performed at a number of occasions, such as the Today show and Germany's Next Topmodel.

== Critical reception ==
Professional ratings
Aggregate scores
Source	Rating
Metacritic	63/100
Review scores
Source	Rating
AllMusic	4/5 stars
The Guardian	2/5 stars
The Independent	4/5 stars
The Line of Best Fit	7/10
NME	4/5 stars
Pitchfork	4.3/10
Rolling Stone	3/5 stars
Slant Magazine	3/5 stars

At Metacritic, which assigns a normalized rating out of 100 to reviews from professional publications, Feed the Beast received an average score of 63 based on nine reviews, indicating "generally favorable reviews".

On a positive review, Nick Levine from NME called the album "a tremendously entertaining showcase for a pop star", praising Petras' ability to "go deep" when she wants to, while understanding the "visceral thrill of dumb escapism". Kayleigh Watson from The Line of Best Fit also gave the album a positive score, calling it a "sonic tour-de-force of euphoric dance anthems". Petras's power as a songwriter and performer was also praised. Many critics thought the album didn't live up to Petras's usual level of artistry and were mixed on their reviews. Writing for Pitchfork, Shaad D'Souza called the record "too safe" and was left disappointed, stating that Petras "let all [her] edge get sanded away." For The Guardian, Alexis Petridis thought the album was a "missed opportunity for a groundbreaking figure" and was more critical of some songs, such as "Coconuts". Alexa Camp for Slant Magazine praised some songs such as "Thousand Pieces" and "Minute", but called it "safe" after her Slut Pop EP.

== Track listing ==
Feed the Beast track listing
No.	Title	Lyrics	Music	Producer(s)	Length
1.	"Feed the Beast"	Kim Petras; Trey Campbell	Mathieu Jomphe Lépine; Lukasz Gottwald	Ryan OG; Billboard	2:30
2.	"Alone" (with Nicki Minaj)	Petras; Onika Maraj; Ryan Ogren	Gottwald; Sebastiaan Molijn; Eelke Kalberg; Rocco Valdes	Dr. Luke; Rocco Did It Again!	3:05
3.	"King of Hearts"	Petras; Madison Love	Henry Walter; Everett Romano; John Mitchell	Cirkut; Heavy Mellow	2:51
4.	"Thousand Pieces"	Petras; Anne Linnet; Max Martin	Martin; Gottwald; Max Grahn	Dr. Luke; Fat Max Gsus	2:23
5.	"Uhoh"	Petras; Love	Ian Kirkpatrick	Kirkpatrick	2:50
6.	"Revelations"	Petras	Gottwald; Aaron Joseph; Vaughn Oliver	Dr. Luke; Joseph; Oliver	2:50
7.	"Bait" (featuring Banks)	Petras; Jillian Rose Banks	Mark Williams; Raul Cubina; Jasper Harris	Harris; Ojivolta; Jarrod Morgan^{[c]}	2:35
8.	"Sex Talk"	Petras; Ogren	Gottwald; Joseph; Oliver; Ogren; Valdes	Dr. Luke; Joseph; Oliver; Valdes	2:35
9.	"Hit It from the Back"	Petras; Ester Dean	Gottwald; Aaron Aguilar; Oliver	Dr. Luke; Joseph; Oliver	2:28
10.	"Claws"	Petras; Ali Tamposi	Walter; Romano	Cirkut; Heavy Mellow	3:13
11.	"Minute"	Petras; Tamposi; Sarah Faith Griffiths	Stefan Johnson; Jordan K. Johnson; Isaiah Tejada; Michael Pollack; Jacob Kasher Hindlin	The Monsters & Strangerz; Tejada; Gian Stone^{[v]}; S. Johnson^{[v]}	3:05
12.	"Coconuts"	Petras; Aaron Jennings	Gottwald; Aaron Joseph; Ogren; Oliver; Cedric de Saint-Rome; Valdes	Dr. Luke; Joseph; Housefly; Rocco Did It Again!; Ryan OG; Oliver	2:49
13.	"Castle in the Sky"	Petras; Sarah Hudson; Clarence Coffee Jr.	Walter; Jimmy Napes	Cirkut	2:25
14.	"Brrr"	Petras; Max Grahn; Nick Harwood	Ilya Salmanzadeh; Rami Yacoub	Ilya^{[p]}; Yacoub^{[a]}	2:32
15.	"Unholy" (with Sam Smith) (bonus track)	Sam Smith; Petras	Smith; Napes; Salmanzadeh; Walter; Blake Slatkin; Omer Fedi	Ilya; Cirkut; Slatkin; Fedi; Napes; Smith	2:36
Total length:					40:36

=== Notes ===
- ^{^[p]} signifies a primary and vocal producer.
- ^{^[c]} signifies a co-producer.
- ^{^[a]} signifies an additional producer.
- ^{^[v]} signifies a vocal producer.
- "Alone" samples "Better Off Alone", written by Sebastiaan Molijn and Eelke Kalberg and performed by Alice Deejay.
- "King of Hearts" interpolates "Two of Hearts", written by John Mitchell and performed by Stacey Q.
- "Thousand Pieces" interpolates "Tusind Stykker", written and performed by Anne Linnet.
- "Uhoh" and "Brrr" are stylized in all lowercase, while "Bait" is stylized in all uppercase.
- The physical releases of Feed the Beast list "Alone" and "Bait" as featuring Nicki Minaj and Banks respectively, instead of the tracks being listed as duets. "Unholy" is also listed as Sam Smith featuring Kim Petras.

== Personnel ==
Musicians

- Kim Petras – vocals
- Dr. Luke – programming (tracks 1, 6, 8, 9, 12)
- Rocco Did It Again! – programming (1)
- Housefly – programming, keyboards, bass (12)
- Nicki Minaj – vocals (2)
- Cirkut – programming (3, 13), background vocals (15)
- Fat Max Gsus – background vocals, bass guitar, drums, French horn, guitar, keyboards, programming (4)
- Ian Kirkpatrick – programming (5)
- Aaron Joseph – programming (6, 8, 9, 12)
- Vaughn Oliver – programming (6, 8, 9, 12)
- Michael Pollack – background vocals (11)
- Sarah Faith-Griffiths – background vocals (11)
- Pierre-Luc Rioux – guitar (11)
- Isaiah Tejada – keyboards, programming (11)
- Jordan K. Johnson – piano, programming (11)
- Stefan Johnson – piano, programming (11)
- Ilya – background vocals, bass guitar, drums, keyboards, programming (14)
- Rami Yacoub – background vocals (14)
- Sam Smith – vocals, background vocals (15)
- Jimmy Napes – background vocals (15)
- Chris Worsey – cello (15)
- Ian Burdge – cello (15)
- Tony Woollard – cello (15)
- Vicky Matthews – cello (15)
- Chris Laurence – double bass (15)
- Stacey Watton – double bass (15)
- Simon Hale – string arrangement (15)
- Adrian Smith – viola (15)
- Andy Parker – viola (15)
- Jenny Lewisohn – viola (15)
- John Metcalfe – viola (15)
- Reiad Chibah – viola (15)
- Alison Dods – violin (15)
- Charis Jenson – violin (15)
- Charlie Brown – violin (15)
- Everton Nelson – violin (15)
- Ian Humphries – violin (15)
- Louisa Fuller – violin (15)
- Lucy Wilkins – violin (15)
- Marianne Haynes – violin (15)
- Natalia Bonner – violin (15)
- Patrick Kiernan – violin (15)
- Perry Montague-Mason – violin (15)
- Richard George – violin (15)
- Steve Morris – violin (15)
- Warren Zielinski – violin (15)

Technical

- Dale Becker – mastering (1, 3–13)
- Randy Merrill – mastering (2, 14, 15)
- Clint Gibbs – mixing (1, 3–5, 7, 10, 11, 13), engineering (2, 6, 8, 9, 12)
- Serban Ghenea – mixing (2, 4, 6, 8, 9, 12, 14, 15)
- Sean Phelan – engineering (1)
- Aubry Delaine – engineering (2)
- Kalani Thompson – engineering (2, 6, 8, 9, 12)
- Tyler Sheppard – engineering (2, 6, 8, 9, 12)
- John Hanes – engineering (8, 9, 14), immersive mix engineering (12, 14)
- Stefan Johnson – engineering (11)
- Ilya Salmanzadeh – engineering (14)
- Jeremy Lertola – engineering (14)
- Sam Holland – engineering (14)
- Gordon Davidson – engineering (15)
- Gus Pirelli – engineering (15)
- Freddie Light – recording (15)
- George Oulton – recording (15)
- Bryce Bordone – mixing assistance (2, 4, 6, 8, 9, 12, 14, 15)
- Grant Horton – engineering assistance (2, 6, 8, 12)
- Ed Farrell – engineering assistance (15)
- Ira Grylack – engineering assistance (15)
- Miles Wheway – engineering assistance (15)
- Natalia Milanesi – engineering assistance (15)
- Fili Filizzola – mastering assistance (9)
- Hector Vega – mastering assistance (9)

== Charts ==
=== Weekly charts ===
Weekly chart performance for Feed the Beast
Chart (2023)	Peak position
Australian Albums (ARIA)	63
Belgian Albums (Ultratop Flanders)	128
Canadian Albums (Billboard)	49
French Albums (SNEP)	174
German Albums (Offizielle Top 100)	24
Polish Albums (ZPAV)	82
Scottish Albums (Official Charts)	35
Spanish Albums (Promusicae)	71
Swiss Albums (Schweizer Hitparade)	76
UK Albums (Official Charts)	52
US Billboard 200	44
US Top Dance Albums (Billboard)	2

=== Year-end charts ===
2023 year-end chart performance for Feed the Beast
Chart (2023)	Position
US Top Dance/Electronic Albums (Billboard)	20

2024 year-end chart performance for Feed the Beast
Chart (2024)	Position
US Top Dance/Electronic Albums (Billboard)	23
