= Coconuts (song) =

2021 song by Kim Petras

Single by Kim Petras
- A-side: "Future Starts Now"
- Released: 3 December 2021
- Genre: Disco-pop
- Length: 2:48
- Label: Amigo; Republic
- Songwriters: Aaron Joseph; Aaron Jennings; Cedric de Saint-Rome; Kim Petras; Lukasz Gottwald; Rocco Valdes; Ryan Ogren; Vaughn Oliver
- Producers: Dr. Luke; Aaron Joseph; Housefly; Rocco Did It Again!; Ryan OG; Vaughn Oliver

Kim Petras singles chronology
"Future Starts Now" (2021)	"Coconuts" (2021)	"Unholy" (2022)

Music video
- "Coconuts (Dance Performance Video)" on YouTube

"Coconuts" is a song by German singer Kim Petras, included on her debut studio album Feed the Beast (2023). It was initially released on 3 December 2021 as the second single from Petras' intended debut studio album, Problématique. Petras wrote the track with Lil Aaron and its producers Aaron Joseph, Dr. Luke, Housefly, Rocco Did It Again!, Ryan OG, and Vaughn Oliver.

Previously slated for release in January 2022, the song had its date moved forward to December 2021.

== Promotion ==
Petras performed the song at the 2021 MTV Europe Music Awards. Following this, Petras uploaded a short clip of the EMA performance, alongside a studio snippet of the song onto TikTok, which has amassed more than 55 thousand uses.

The song was originally intended to be included on Petras’ originally planned debut studio album, Problématique, with several other songs however, the album was postponed in favour of Feed The Beast (2023), on which the song was later included.

== Music video ==
A dance performance video for the song was released on 10 January 2022.

== Charts ==
Chart performance for "Coconuts"
Chart (2021–2024)	Peak position
New Zealand Hot Singles (RMNZ)	23
UK Singles Downloads (Official Charts)	86

== Usage in media ==
The song was featured in the eighth season episode "The Supermarket Ball" of RuPaul's Drag Race All Stars, being performed by contestant Jessica Wild and guest Ra'Jah O'Hara in a "lipsync for your legacy".
