= Alone (Kim Petras and Nicki Minaj song) =

2023 single by Kim Petras and Nicki Minaj

Single by Kim Petras and Nicki Minaj

from the album Feed the Beast
- Released: 21 April 2023
- Genre: Dance; trap-pop; Hip-hop; Electronic
- Length: 3:05
- Label: Amigo; Republic
- Songwriters: Eelke Kahlberg; Kim Petras; Onika Maraj; Sebastiaan Molijn; Ryan Ogren; Lukasz Gottwald; Rocco Valdes
- Producers: Dr. Luke; Rocco Did It Again!

Kim Petras singles chronology
"If Jesus Was a Rockstar" (2022)	"Alone" (2023)	"Stars Are Blind (Paris' Version)" (2023)

Nicki Minaj singles chronology
"Princess Diana" (2023)	"Alone" (2023)	"Pound Town 2" (2023)

Music video
- "Alone" on YouTube

"Alone" is a song by German singer Kim Petras and American rapper Nicki Minaj. It was released on 21 April 2023 through Amigo Records and Republic Records as the lead and only single from Petras' major-label debut studio album, Feed the Beast (2023). The song was produced by Dr Luke and Rocco Did It Again!. The song became a top 10 hit in Turkey and a top 40 hit in Slovakia, on the United Kingdom Singles Chart and Irish Singles Chart.

== Background ==
Kim Petras' admiration for rapper Nicki Minaj dated back as far as 2011. First speculations about a collaboration arose in early March 2023, after Petras started commenting on Minaj's Instagram. In an interview with Billboard, the singer also mentioned Minaj as part of her dream girl group. On 9 March and 15 March, Petras posted snippets of the song to her TikTok account. The singer announced the collaboration with Minaj on 6 April. She is seen answering a phone and lip-synching over Minaj's part of the song. The song samples "Better Off Alone" (1999) by Alice Deejay. Musically, it has been described as a dance track.

== Music video ==
The music video for the song was directed by Arrad. They stated: "Inspiration was drawn from the quintessential early 2000s Europop music videos by artists such as Fedde Le Grand and Alex Gaudino."

Petras stated: "I wanted a really German techy vibe, and was so happy Nicki was down. The harness was custom made by Zana Bayne."

== Critical reception ==
"Alone" received generally positive reviews from critics. Tyler Damara Kelly of The Line of Best Fit described the song as a "club-ready dance-pop track" that "elevates Petras’ penchant for glossy hooks with Minaj's effortless rap verses." Jeff Nelson from People praised the track for sampling the iconic 1999 hit "Better Off Alone" by Alice Deejay and called it "an infectious bop that blends nostalgic dance with a modern twist." Charlotte Manning of Attitude wrote that Petras and Minaj "absolutely deliver" on the "ultimate dance banger" and highlighted the song's catchy beat and Minaj's "spicy verse." In a review for Euphoria, Nmesoma Okechukwu commended the collaboration for delivering "undeniable chemistry between Petras and Minaj," noting that "Alone" is a "catchy dance-pop anthem" destined for club and radio success.

On the other hand, some critics were more critical of the song. Mosi Reeves of Rolling Stone pointed out that while Minaj's performance was strong, the track's "repetitive hooks" and "overly polished production" lacked the originality found in both artists' previous works. Mano Sundaresan of NPR criticized the track for being "void of personality" and called Minaj's verse "a well-worn rhyme scheme with platitudes about money and private jets." Sundaresan concluded that the collaboration between Petras and Minaj ultimately didn't live up to its promise.

== Track listing ==
Streaming/digital download – single

1. "Alone" – 3:05
2. "Alone" (a cappella) – 3:04
3. "Alone" (extended) – 4:01

Streaming/digital download – sped up and slowed version

1. "Alone" (sped up) – 2:35
2. "Alone" (slowed) – 3:23

Streaming/digital download – remixes

1. "Alone" – 3:05
2. "Alone" (2.0) – 3:05
3. "Alone" (DallasK remix) – 3:41
4. "Alone" (Alex Chapman remix) – 3:22
5. "Alone" (Tommie Sunshine & On Deck remix) – 5:10
6. "Alone" (extended) – 4:01
7. "Alone" (sped up) – 2:35
8. "Alone" (slowed) – 3:23
9. "Alone" (a cappella) – 3:04
10. "Alone" (instrumental) – 3:04

Streaming/digital download – James Hype remix

1. "Alone" (James Hype remix) – 3:00

Streaming/digital download – Major Lazer remix

1. "Alone" (Major Lazer remix) – 2:48

== Charts ==
=== Weekly charts ===
Weekly chart performance for "Alone"
Chart (2023–2024)	Peak position
Canada Hot 100 (Billboard)	72
Canada CHR/Top 40 (Billboard)	8
Canada Hot AC (Billboard)	43
Croatia International Airplay (Top lista)	71
Estonia Airplay (TopHit)	54
Global 200 (Billboard)	79
Greece International (IFPI)	77
Ireland (IRMA)	35
Japan Hot Overseas (Billboard Japan)	9
Lithuania Airplay (TopHit)	57
New Zealand Hot Singles (RMNZ)	4
Poland (Polish Airplay Top 100)	43
Slovakia Airplay (ČNS IFPI)	26
Sweden Heatseeker (Sverigetopplistan)	17
Turkey International Airplay (Radiomonitor Türkiye)	4
UK Singles (Official Charts)	37
US Billboard Hot 100	55
US Hot Dance/Electronic Songs (Billboard)	10
US Pop Airplay (Billboard)	25

=== Monthly charts ===
Monthly chart performance for "Alone"
Chart (2023)	Peak position
Estonia Airplay (TopHit)	86
Lithuania Airplay (TopHit)	91
Slovakia (Rádio – Top 100)	29

=== Year-end charts ===
Year-end chart performance for "Alone"
Chart (2023)	Position
US Hot Dance/Electronic Songs (Billboard)	30

== Certifications ==
Certifications for "Alone"
Region	Certification	Certified units/sales
Brazil (Pro-Música Brasil)	Gold	20,000^{‡}
Canada (Music Canada)	Gold	40,000^{‡}
Poland (ZPAV)	Gold	25,000^{‡}
^{‡} Sales+streaming figures based on certification alone.

== Release history ==
Release dates and formats for "Alone"
Region	Date	Format	Version	Label	Ref.
Various	21 April 2023	Digital download; streaming	Single	Amigo; Republic	
Various	25 April 2023	Digital download; streaming	Single EP	Amigo; Republic	
Various	27 April 2023	Digital download; streaming	Sped Up + Slowed	Amigo; Republic	
Various	24 May 2023	Digital download; streaming	Remix album	Amigo; Republic	
Various	16 June 2023	Digital download; streaming	James Hype remix	Amigo; Republic	
Various	22 June 2023	Digital download; streaming	Major Lazer remix	Amigo; Republic	
