= If Jesus Was a Rockstar =

Single by Kim Petras
- Released: 11 November 2022
- Genre: Pop
- Length: 2:50
- Label: Amigo; Republic
- Songwriters: Kim Petras; Ilya Salmanzadeh; Savan Kotecha; Max Martin; Omer Fedi; Peter Svensson
- Producers: Kim Petras; Ilya; Max Martin; Omer Fedi

Kim Petras singles chronology
"Unholy" (2022)	"If Jesus Was a Rockstar" (2022)	"Alone" (2023)

"If Jesus Was a Rockstar" is a song by German singer Kim Petras, released on 11 November 2022 through Amigo and Republic Records. The song was originally planned to serve as the lead single from Petras' debut studio album Feed the Beast (2023), but it was ultimately dropped from the tracklist. It was written by Petras, Ilya Salmanzadeh, Savan Kotecha, Max Martin, Omer Fedi and Peter Svensson, with Ilya, Martin and Fedi serving as producers.

== Background and recording ==
Petras expected to write the song with just Savan Kotecha and Ilya, but Max Martin was also present when she met with the writers, and he ended up co-writing and producing the song as well as providing backing vocals on it. Petras and the three "talked about the song" then tried out things "to see what stuck".

The song was described as "guitar-driven" and a "new era" for Petras, with Petras calling it "fun" but "also really lyrically intense", as it was written after she "struggled with her spirituality over the [COVID-19] pandemic" and reflected on her feeling "excluded" from religion growing up. Petras also spoke about wanting to "switch things up" from the "gay club music" she had become known for and "sing about something deeply meaningful, something that I struggle with and something that is just honest".

Petras elaborated that "the song kinda says maybe if religion was cooler, then I would wanna be a part of it. So, if Jesus was a rockstar, maybe I'd want to be just like him."

== Promotion ==
Petras first revealed the song on TikTok in September 2022, before revealing the release date on social media on 1 November. An acoustic version was released on 13 December 2022.

== Charts ==
Chart performance for "If Jesus Was a Rockstar"
Chart (2022)	Peak position
Japan Hot Overseas (Billboard Japan)	19
