= Max Lousada =

English music businessman

Max Lousada is a British music executive and the co-founder of 26.2 a music company with offices in London and New York. 26.2 is in partnership with Sony Music for global distribution. He previously was CEO of Recorded Music for Warner Music Group and oversaw the company’s recorded music operations including labels such as Atlantic Records, Warner Records, Parlophone, 300 Elektra Entertainment and Warner Music Nashville. Lousada earlier was Chairman and CEO of Warner Music UK and led Atlantic Records UK for nine years. Over the course of his career he has been instrumental in releases by artists including Coldplay, Ed Sheeran, Dua Lipa, Bruno Mars, Stormzy, Fred Again and Charli XCX.

Originally from Tooting Bec, South London, England, Lousada became involved in the music industry in the 1990s with the emerging dance music scene in Brighton. He later founded his own independent imprint, Ultimate Dilemma, and became the head of Rawkus Records' operations outside North America. In 2002, he was appointed head of A&R at Mushroom Records UK, which was acquired by Warner Music Group and became part of Atlantic Records UK. He became the CEO of Recorded Music at Warner Music Group in 2017.

== Early life and education ==
Max Lousada grew up in Tooting Bec, South London, England, and went to Elliott School in Putney. His mother was a photographer, and his father was a social worker and political activist. As a child, Lousada would spend his Saturdays selling newspapers of the Socialist Workers Party near Elephant and Castle. He later enrolled at University of Brighton but left after six months.

== Career ==
=== Early career ===
Lousada became involved in the emerging dance music scene in Brighton, frequenting places like the Jazz Rooms or The Zap, and organizing club nights. He later started his own distribution and management company, called In A Silent Way, with four of his friends. Named after a Miles Davis album, In A Silent Way was a fashion and music collective which imported and exported records for DJs and independent outlets. Through a network of labels and shops, Lousada imported and sold a variety of products ranging from French hip-hop vinyl records to Adidas trainers.

Lousada then worked for several small independent record labels and shops before forming his own independent imprint, Ultimate Dilemma. He was also appointed by Rawkus Records founders Brian Brater and Jarret Myer to lead the New York-based label's operations outside of North America. At Rawkus, Lousada was able to work with artists such as Mos Def and garner airplay for "Ms. Fat Booty" on BBC Radio 1. While operating independently, Rawkus Records was at the time funded by News International and partnered with Mushroom Records UK.

Mushroom Records UK also began funding Lousada's own label, Ultimate Dilemma, and he moved his operations from the Old Truman Brewery, where Rawkus Records UK was the first record label tenant, to Mushroom Records UK's studios in Fulham. In 2001, he signed ambient dance act Zero 7 and played a role in the development of their debut album Simple Things, which was nominated for the Mercury Prize. In February 2002, Lousada was appointed head A&R at Mushroom Records UK and its imprints Infectious, Perfecto and Ultimate Dilemma.

=== Atlantic Records and Warner Music UK ===
After its acquisition by Warner Music Group in 2003, Mushroom Records UK was absorbed into East West Records, and Lousada assumed the role of head of A&R at East West, which Warner Music turned into the UK operations of its Atlantic Records. Lousada was appointed managing director at Atlantic Records UK in 2004 where he achieved success with acts such as The Darkness, James Blunt and Funeral For a Friend, before being promoted to president, and then to chairman in 2009.

Lousada was named chairman and CEO of Warner Music UK in September 2013. In 2016, he oversaw the development of The Firepit, Warner Music UK's new recording studio located inside its London headquarters. In June 2016, Atlantic Records UK signed singer Rita Ora after her departure from Roc Nation. Lousada also led the successful promotion of Ed Sheeran's third album, ÷, in late 2017. Two singles from the album were released at the same time and Lousada opted to release the album to free streaming services simultaneously with paid services. It became the best selling album of 2017 and "Shape of You", a single from the album, became the most popular song of the year.

=== BRITs ===
From 2014 to 2016, Lousada was chairman of the BRITs Committee. responsible for the creative direction of the annual music awards. His first show as Chairman in February 2015 featured Ant & Dec as hosts with performances from Madonna, Sam Smith, Ed Sheeran, Royal Blood, Paloma Faith and Kanye West, while the trophy was designed by Tracey Emin.

Lousada's second year as the BRITs Chairman saw Ant & Dec return as hosts with performances from Coldplay, Justin Bieber, James Bay, Jess Glynne, Little Mix, The Weeknd and Adele. The show also featured a tribute to David Bowie with an introduction by Annie Lennox, a tribute speech by Gary Oldman and a performance by Lorde with Bowie's long-time backing group. The trophy was designed by Pam Hogg.

=== Warner Music Group ===
In October 2017, Lousada was appointed CEO of Recorded Music for Warner Music Group (WMG) while remaining chairman and CEO of Warner Music UK. He became responsible for all of WMG's global recorded music operations, including Atlantic, Warner Bros. Records (now Warner Records), Parlophone, Rhino and Warner Classics, as well as the artist and label services divisions, WEA (now WMX) and Alternative Distribution Alliance (ADA).

A month before becoming CEO of Recorded Music, he had overseen the acquisition of the Dutch electronic label Spinnin' Records. Within days of taking the new role, Lousada appointed Aaron Bay-Schuck and Tom Corson to lead Warner Bros. Records. In November 2020, Lousada appointed Maria Weaver as president of WEA. In April 2021, he promoted Cat Kreidich to president of ADA.

Lousada has cultivated the careers of several artists, including Dua Lipa who said in an interview in 2018, "Max has believed in me from the very start. He has played a massive role in my career and my growth as an artist. He's really turned my dreams into a career." Under Lousada's leadership, Warner Music in 2019 also reached a deal with Q&A, a company started by Troy Carter. In October 2021, Lousada reached a deal with Coldplay for a long-term contract to continue their work with Parlophone and Atlantic, ahead of the release of their latest album Music of the Spheres. In November 2021, WMG began a joint venture, Marv Music, with Matthew Vaughn's Marv Studios. In December 2021, Lousada led Warner Music Group in the acquisition of 300 Entertainment, the record company led by Kevin Liles, which included artists Megan Thee Stallion and Young Thug. Elektra and 300 Entertainment were grouped under 300 Elektra Entertainment. In March 2022, Lousada reached a deal with Patrick Moxey for Warner Music to do the worldwide distribution for Moxey's Payday Records and Helix Records via ADA. WMG also reached a deal with filmmaker Lee Daniels to start Lee Daniels Music to develop music projects, including soundtracks, and sign other artists.
