= Julie Greenwald =

American music industry executive

- Born: 1970 (age 55–56); New York, U.S.
- Education: Tulane University
- Occupation: Music industry executive
- Years active: 1992–present
- Spouse: Lewis Largent (died 2023)
- Children: 2

Julie Greenwald (born 1970) is an American music industry executive and co-founder of 26.2 a music company with offices in London and New York. 26.2 is in partnership with Sony Music for global distribution. She formerly served as chairperson and chief executive officer of Atlantic Records Group and Atlantic Music Group.

Greenwald has held senior executive roles at Def Jam Recordings, The Island Def Jam Music Group, and Atlantic Records. She became president of Atlantic Records in 2004 and CEO and chair in October 2022.

== Early life and education ==
Greenwald grew up in the Catskills. She attended Tulane University, graduating in 1992 with a double major in political science and English. She joined Teach for America following her graduation.

== Career ==
Greenwald began her career in the music industry in 1992 at Def Jam Recordings. In 2002 she was appointed president of The Island Def Jam Music Group.

In 2004 Greenwald joined Atlantic Records as president. In 2006 she was promoted to chairman and chief operating officer of the label.

During this period Atlantic Records achieved significant commercial success. Artists associated with Atlantic during Greenwald's tenure included Bruno Mars, Ed Sheeran, Cardi B, Flo Rida, Jason Mraz, Paramore, Death Cab for Cutie, and Charlie Puth.

Greenwald worked closely with Atlantic chairman and CEO Craig Kallman in leading the label; their partnership was described as Industry as complementary leadership structure, with Kallman overseeing artist development and A&R while Greenwald focused on marketing, promotion, and operational strategy across the label group.

In 2022 Warner Music Group reorganized its recorded music operations under the name Atlantic Music Group, with Greenwald serving as chairman and CEO. She stepped down from the position in January 2025.

== Recognition ==
Greenwald appeared on Billboard's Power 100 list annually from 2012 through 2024. She appeared on its annual Women in Music list more than a dozen times including 2017, when she was named Executive of the Year, and 2010, when she was ranked at #1 on the Women in Music Power Players list.
