= Wendy Goldstein =

American music executive

- Born: 1963 (age 62–63); New York, NY
- Occupation: Music executive
- Employer: Republic Records

Wendy Goldstein is an American music executive known for her work in artist and repertoire (A&R). She is the co-president of Republic Records, a position she has held since November 2021.

== Career ==
Goldstein began her career in the music industry at age 19 as an assistant in the A&R department at Epic Records. She subsequently held positions at RCA Records, East West Records, Geffen Records, and Priority/Capitol Records. During this time, she was involved in the development of artists such as The Roots, Common, GZA, and The Bloodhound Gang.

=== Republic Records ===
Goldstein joined Republic Records in 2009 as an A&R consultant. She was appointed Senior Vice President of A&R in 2011 and Executive Vice President and Head of Urban A&R in 2014.

In these roles, she contributed to the development and careers of artists including The Weeknd, Ariana Grande, Hailee Steinfeld, DNCE, Julia Michaels, Marc E. Bassy, John Legend, and the Jonas Brothers. In 2019, Goldstein was promoted to President, West Coast Creative at Republic Records. In 2021, she was named co-president of the label.

== Recognition ==
Goldstein has appeared on the Billboard Power 100 and on the magazine's list of the most influential women in music every year since 2020.. In 2021, she was named A&R of the Year by Variety. In 2024, she received the inaugural Seymour Stein Global A&R Award at MUSEXPO in acknowledgement of her three decades of contributions to artist development in the music industry.
