= Dr. Luke production discography =

The production discography of producer Dr. Luke is as follows:

== Written and co-written songs ==
Year	Artist	Album	Song	Co-written with
1997	Kasz	Non-album single	"Wave Gravy"	No additional writers
1997	Kasz	Non-album single	"Wet Lapse"	No additional writers
1998	The Getaway People	The Getaway People	"She Gave Me Love"	Per Ottestad
1999	Wide	Unknownwerks	"Lift Ticket"	Anthony Todd "Liquid Todd" Wilkinson
1999	Wide	Torchbearers	"Top Rockin'"	Anthony Todd "Liquid Todd" Wilkinson
1999	Wide	Action	"Rocktronix"	Anthony Todd "Liquid Todd" Wilkinson
1999	Wide	Deep Porn	"Zap"	Anthony Todd "Liquid Todd" Wilkinson
1999	Kodō	Sai-Sō	"Wax On (Kasz & David Beal Mix)"	David Russell Beal, Qian Yao
2000	Mocean Worker	Aural & Hearty	"Hey Baby"	Adam Dornblum
2001	Jive Jones	Me, Myself + I	"Dear Dad"	Jive Jones
2002	Ursula 1000	Kinda Kinky	"Kinda Kinky"	Alexander Gimeno
2002	Ursula 1000	Kinda Kinky	"Samba 1000"	Alexander Gimeno
2002	Ursula 1000	Kinda Kinky	"The Girl from N.O.W.H.E.R.E."	Alexander Gimeno
2002	Speech	Down South; Produckshuns	"The New Sound (Hip-Hop Hillbilly)"	Todd Thomas
2002	Speech	Down South; Produckshuns	"Ain't Nothing New But You"	Todd Thomas
2002	Liquid Todd & Dr. Luke	The Hot Chick OST	"Stick 'Em"	Anthony Todd "Liquid Todd" Wilkinson
2002	Kelly Osbourne	Shut Up	"Too Much of You"	Kelly Osbourne, Kara DioGuardi
2003	SK	Non-album single	"Single Black Female"	Serron King, David Katz
2003	Jang Na-ra	Oh! Happy Day OST	"Oh! Happy Day"	Hwa Young Bae, Kara Elizabeth DioGuardi, Suk Won Park, Lindy Robbins
2003	Jeannie Ortega	Love Don't Cost a Thing OST	"Got What It Takes"	David Anthony "Dave" Katz, Jeannette "Jeannie" Ortega
2004	Arrested Development	Among the Trees	"Esmerelda"	Todd Thomas, Madeline Gangelhoss
2004	Kelly Clarkson	Breakaway	"Since U Been Gone"	Karl Sandberg
2004	Kelly Clarkson	Breakaway	"Behind These Hazel Eyes"	Kelly Clarkson, Karl Sandberg
2005	Ebony Eyez	7 Day Cycle	"Real Life"	Ebony Williams, Marc Williams, Jerrell Jones, Derryl Howard, Maurice Wilson
2005	Marion Raven	Here I Am	"Break You"	Karl Sandberg
2005	Backstreet Boys	Never Gone	"Just Want You to Know"	Karl Sandberg
2005	Backstreet Boys	Never Gone	"Climbing the Walls"	Karl Sandberg
2005	The Veronicas	The Secret Life Of...	"4ever"	Karl Sandberg
2005	The Veronicas	The Secret Life Of...	"Everything I'm Not"	Jessica Origliasso, Lisa Origliasso, Karl Sandberg, Rami Yacoub
2005	Bo Bice	The Real Thing	"Make Me Better"	Jill Latiano, Karl Sandberg
2005	Bo Bice	The Real Thing	"Lie... It's Alright"	Karl Sandberg
2006	Ursula 1000	Here Comes Tomorrow	"Hello! Let's Go to a Disco"	Alexander Gimeno
2006	Ursula 1000	Here Comes Tomorrow	"Arrastao"	Alexander Gimeno
2006	Ursula 1000	Here Comes Tomorrow	"Elektrik Boogie"	Alexander Gimeno
2006	Ashley Angel	Soundtrack to Your Life	"Let U Go"	Ashley Parker, Karl Sandberg
2006	Pink	I'm Not Dead	"Who Knew"	Alecia Moore, Karl Sandberg
2006	Pink	I'm Not Dead	"Cuz I Can"	Alecia Moore, Karl Sandberg
2006	Pink	I'm Not Dead	"U + Ur Hand"	Alecia Moore, Karl Sandberg, Rami Yacoub
2006	Ashley Angel	Soundtrack to Your Life	"I'm Better"	Ashley Parker, Shelly Peiken, Karl Sandberg
2006	Jeannie Ortega	No Place Like BKLYN	"Can U?"	Jeannette Ortega, David Katz, Derryl Howard, Maurice Wilson, Alfred Wilson
2006	Paris Hilton	Paris	"Nothing in This World"	Sheppard Solomon
2006	Kelis	Kelis Was Here	"I Don't Think So"	Kelis Rogers-Jones, Karl Sandberg
2006	Jibbs	Jibbs Featuring Jibbs	"Firr Az That Thang"	Jovan Campbell, Derryl Howard, Maurice Wilson
2006	Lady Sovereign	Public Warning	"Love Me or Hate Me"	Louise Harman
2006	Lady Sovereign	Public Warning	"Those Were the Days"	Louise Harman
2006	Samantha Jade	My Name Is Samantha Jade (shelved)	"What I Got"	Arnthor Birgisson, Rami Yacoub
2006	Daughtry	Daughtry	"Feels Like Tonight"	Sheppard Solomon, Karl Sandberg
2006	Sara Niemietz	PollyWorld OST	"Perfect Kinda Day"	Amy Powers, Steven Wolf, May Marjourie
2007	Avril Lavigne	The Best Damn Thing	"Girlfriend"	Avril Lavigne
2007	Avril Lavigne	The Best Damn Thing	"I Can Do Better"	Avril Lavigne
2007	Avril Lavigne	The Best Damn Thing	"Runaway"	Avril Lavigne
2007	Avril Lavigne	The Best Damn Thing	"I Don't Have to Try"	Avril Lavigne
2007	Avril Lavigne	The Best Damn Thing	"Keep Holding On"	Avril Lavigne
2007	Avril Lavigne	The Best Damn Thing	"Alone"	Avril Lavigne, Karl Sandberg
2007	Avril Lavigne	The Best Damn Thing	"I Will Be"	Avril Lavigne, Karl Sandberg
2007	Megan McCauley	Better Than Blood	"Tap That"	Megan McCauley, Karl Sandberg
2007	Lil Mama	VYP	"G-Slide (Tour Bus)"	Niatia Kirkland, Brian Singleton, Derryl Howard, Maurice Wilson
2007	Sugababes	Change	"About You Now"	Catherine Dennis
2007	Sugababes	Change	"Surprise"	Catherine Dennis
2007	Sugababes	Change	"Open the Door"	Keisha Buchanan, Heidi Range, Catherine Dennis
2007	Skye Sweetnam	Sound Soldier	"Girl Like Me"	Shelly Peiken, Karl Sandberg
2007	Leona Lewis	Spirit	"I Will Be"	Avril Lavigne, Karl Sandberg
2008	Lil Mama	VYP	"Broken Pieces"	Niatia Kirkland, James Chambers
2008	Katy Perry	One of the Boys	"I Kissed a Girl"	Katheryn Hudson, Catherine Dennis, Karl Sandberg
2008	Miranda Cosgrove	iCarly	"About You Now"	Catherine Dennis
2008	Katy Perry	One of the Boys	"Hot n Cold"	Katheryn Hudson, Karl Sandberg
2008	Vanessa Hudgens	Identified	"Identified"	Catherine Dennis, Karl Sandberg
2008	Vanessa Hudgens	Identified	"First Bad Habit"	Catherine Dennis
2008	Vanessa Hudgens	Identified	"Don't Ask Why"	Catherine Dennis, Beau Dozier
2008	Vanessa Hudgens	Identified	"Amazed"	Catherine Dennis, Benjamin Levin, Niatia Kirkland
2008	Lesley Roy	Unbeautiful	"Slow Goodbye"	Lesley Roy, Katheryn Hudson, Karl Sandberg
2008	Britney Spears	Circus	"Circus"	Claude Kelly, Benjamin Levin
2008	Britney Spears	Circus	"Shattered Glass"	Claude Kelly, Benjamin Levin
2008	Britney Spears	Circus	"Lace and Leather"	Frankie Storm, Ronnie Jackson, Benjamin Levin
2008	Will Ferrell & John C. Reilly	Step Brothers OST	"Boats 'N Hoes"	Adam McKay, John C. Reilly, Will Ferrell
2009	Kelly Clarkson	All I Ever Wanted	"My Life Would Suck Without You"	Claude Kelly, Karl Sandberg
2009	Flo Rida	R.O.O.T.S.	"Right Round (feat. Kesha)"	Tramar Dillard, Peter Hernandez, Philip Lawrence, Justin Franks, Allan Grigg
2009	Lady Sovereign	Jigsaw	"So Human"	Louise Harman, Gabriel Olegavich, Benjamin Levin, Robert Smith
2009	Flo Rida	R.O.O.T.S.	"Touch Me"	Tramar Dillard, Kesha Sebert, Benjamin Levin
2009	Lady Sovereign	Jigsaw	"Pennies"	Louise Harman, Benjamin Levin
2009	Mickey Avalon	Non-album single	"Fuckin Em All"	Mickey Avalon, Benjamin Levin
2009	Ciara	Fantasy Ride	"Tell Me What Your Name Is"	Ronnie Jackson, Benjamin Levin
2009	Jordin Sparks	Battlefield	"Watch You Go"	Faheem Najm, Benjamin Levin, Joshua Coleman
2009	Kesha	Animal	"Tik Tok"	Kesha Sebert, Benjamin Levin
2009	Kesha	Animal	"Blah Blah Blah (feat. 3OH!3)"	Benny Blanco
2009	Miley Cyrus	The Time of Our Lives EP	"Party in the U.S.A."	Jessica Cornish, Claude Kelly
2009	Pitbull	Pitbull Starring in Rebelution	"Girls"	Armando Perez, G. Clinton, Garry Shider, David Spradley, Joshua Coleman
2009	Miley Cyrus	The Time of Our Lives EP	"The Time of Our Lives"	Kesha Sebert, Pebe Sebert, Claude Kelly
2009	Adam Lambert	For Your Entertainment	"For Your Entertainment"	Claude Kelly
2009	Weezer	Raditude	"I'm Your Daddy"	Rivers Cuomo
2009	Weezer	Raditude	"Get Me Some"	Rivers Cuomo
2010	Kesha	Animal	"Take It Off"	Kesha Sebert, Claude Kelly
2010	Kesha	Animal	"Kiss n Tell"	Kesha Sebert, Karl Sandberg, Karl Schuster
2010	Kesha	Animal	"Hungover"	Kesha Sebert, Karl Sandberg, Karl Schuster
2010	Kesha	Animal	"Blind"	Kesha Sebert, Benjamin Levin, Joshua Coleman
2010	Kesha	Animal	"Dancing with Tears in My Eyes"	Kesha Sebert, Claude Kelly, Benjamin Levin
2010	Kesha	Animal	"Animal"	Kesha Sebert, Pebe Sebert, Greg Kurstin
2010	Miranda Cosgrove	Sparks Fly	"Kissin' U"	Miranda Cosgrove, Claude Kelly
2010	Taio Cruz	Rokstarr	"Dirty Picture, Pt. 2 (feat. Kesha)"	Kesha Sebert, Jacob Cruz, Benjamin Levin, Fraser Thornycroft-Smith
2010	B.o.B	Adventures of Bobby Ray	"Magic (feat. Rivers Cuomo)"	Bobby Simmons Jr., Rivers Cuomo
2010	3OH!3	Streets of Gold	"My First Kiss (feat. Kesha)"	Nathaniel Motte, Sean Foreman, Benjamin Levin
2010	Katy Perry	Teenage Dream	"California Gurls (feat. Snoop Dogg)"	Katheryn Hudson, Bonnie McKee, Karl Sandberg, Benjamin Levin
2010	Taio Cruz	Rokstarr	"Dynamite"	Jacob Cruz, Bonnie McKee, Karl Sandberg, Benjamin Levin
2010	Lil Jon	Crunk Rock	"Hey"	Jonathan Smith, Nathaniel Motte, Sean Foreman, William Hollmes
2010	Kelly Rowland	Here I Am	"Rose Colored Glasses"	Ester Dean
2010	Jesse McCartney	Have It All	"Mrs. Mistake"	Jesse McCartney
2010	3OH!3	Streets of Gold	"Streets of Gold"	Nathaniel Motte, Sean Foreman, Benjamin Levin
2010	Nelly, T-Pain & Akon	5.0	"Move That Body"	Akon, Nelly, Rico Love, Bangladesh, T-Pain
2010	Katy Perry	Teenage Dream	"Teenage Dream"	Katheryn Hudson, Bonnie McKee, Karl Sandberg, Benjamin Levin
2010	Victoria Justice	Victorious OST	"Make It Shine"	Daniel Schneider, Michael Corcoran
2010	Victoria Justice	Victorious OST	"Leave It All to Shine"	Daniel Schneider, Michael Corcoran
2010	Katy Perry	Teenage Dream	"Last Friday Night (T.G.I.F.)"	Katheryn Hudson, Bonnie McKee, Karl Sandberg
2010	Katy Perry	Teenage Dream	"The One That Got Away"	Katheryn Hudson, Karl Sandberg
2010	Katy Perry	Teenage Dream	"E.T. (feat. Kanye West)"	Katheryn Hudson, Karl Sandberg, Joshua Coleman
2010	Kesha	Cannibal EP	"We R Who We R"	Kesha Sebert, Jacob Kasher Hindlin, Benjamin Levin, Joshua Coleman
2010	Kesha	Cannibal EP	"Sleazy"	Kesha Sebert, Benjamin Levin, Klas Ahlund, Shandrae Crowford
2010	Kesha	Cannibal EP	"Blow"	Kesha Sebert, Karl Sandberg, Benjamin Levin, Klas Ahlund, Allan Grigg
2010	Kesha	Cannibal EP	"Crazy Beautiful Life"	Kesha Sebert, Pebe Sebert, Karl Sandberg
2010	Kesha	Cannibal EP	"Grow a Pear"	Kesha Sebert, Karl Sandberg, Benjamin Levin
2010	Flo Rida	Only One Flo (Part 1)	"Who Dat Girl (feat. Akon)"	Tramar Dillard, Peter Hernandez, P. Lawrence, Claude Kelly, Benjamin Levin
2010	T.I.	No Mercy	"That's All She Wrote"	Clifford Harris Jr., Karl Sandberg, Marshall Mathers
2011	Britney Spears	Femme Fatale	"Hold It Against Me"	Bonnie McKee, Karl Sandberg, Mathieu Jomphe-Lepine
2011	Jessie J	Who You Are	"Price Tag (feat. B.o.B )"	Jessica Cornish, Claude Kelly, Bobby Simmons Jr.
2011	Jessie J	Who You Are	"Domino"	Jessica Cornish, Claude Kelly
2011	Jessie J	Who You Are	"Abracadabra"	Jessica Cornish, Claude Kelly
2011	Britney Spears	Femme Fatale	"Till the World Ends"	Kesha Sebert, Alexander Kronlund, Karl Sandberg
2011	Britney Spears	Femme Fatale	"Inside Out"	Bonnie McKee, Jacob Kasher Hindlin, Karl Sandberg, Mathieu Jomphe-Lepine
2011	Britney Spears	Femme Fatale	"Seal It with a Kiss"	Bonnie McKee, Karl Sandberg, Henry Walter
2011	Britney Spears	Femme Fatale	"Gasoline"	Bonnie McKee, Claude Kelly, Benjamin Levin, Emily Wright
2011	Pitbull	Planet Pit	"Come n Go"	Armando Perez, Enrique Iglesias, Karl Sandberg, Benjamin Levin
2011	Sabi	Non-album single	"Wild Heart"	Ester Dean, Henry Walter
2011	Sabi	Non-album single	"Where They Do That At"	Jenice Portlock, Priscilla Hamilton, Henry Walter
2011	Gloria Trevi and Paulina Rubio	Gloria	"No Al Alguacil"	Gloria Treviño, Paulina Rubio, Henry Walter
2011	Flo Rida	Wild Ones	"Good Feeling"	Tramar Dillard, Henry Walter, Timothy Bergling, Arash Pournouri
2011	B.o.B	Strange Clouds	"Strange Clouds"	Bobby Simmons Jr., Jamieson Jones, Henry Walter, Dwayne Carter Jr.
2011	Taio Cruz	TY.O	"Hangover"	Jacob Cruz, Henry Walter
2011	Rihanna	Talk That Talk	"You da One"	Robyn Fenty, Ester Dean, Henry Walter, John Hill
2011	Rihanna	Talk That Talk	"Where Have You Been"	Ester Dean, Henry Walter, Adam Wiles, Albert McElhinney
2011	Rihanna	Talk That Talk	"Fool in Love"	Ester Dean, Henry Walter
2011	T-Pain	Revolver	"Turn All the Lights On"	Faheem Najm, Shaffer Smith, Henry Walter
2011	Taio Cruz	TY.O	"Make It Last Forever"	Jacob Cruz, Ammar Malik, Henry Walter
2011	Taio Cruz	TY.O	"Tattoo"	Jacob Cruz, Henry Walter
2011	Adam Lambert	Trespassing	"Better Than I Know Myself"	Claude Kelly, Henry Walter, Joshua Coleman
2012	Miranda Cosgrove	iCarly OST	"All Kinds of Wrong"	Claude Kelly, Emily Wright
2012	Katy Perry	Teenage Dream: The Complete Confection	"Part of Me"	Katheryn Hudson, Bonnie McKee, Henry Walter
2012	Marina	Electra Heart	"Primadonna"	Marina Diamandis, Julie Frost, Henry Walter
2012	Nicki Minaj	Pink Friday: Roman Reloaded	"Young Forever"	Onika Maraj, Kelly Sheehan, Henry Walter
2012	Nicki Minaj	Pink Friday: Roman Reloaded	"Va Va Voom"	Onika Maraj, Karl Sandberg, Henry Walter, Allan Grigg
2012	Nicki Minaj	Pink Friday: Roman Reloaded	"Masquerade"	Onika Maraj, Karl Sandberg, Henry Walter, Benjamin Levin
2012	Marina	Electra Heart	"Lies"	Marina Diamandis, Henry Walter, Thomas Pentz
2012	Marina	Electra Heart	"How to Be a Heartbreaker"	Marina Diamandis, Ammar Malik, D. Omelio, Henry Walter, Benjamin Levin
2012	B.o.B	Strange Clouds	"Both of Us (feat. Taylor Swift)"	Bobby Simmons Jr., Jamieson Jones, Taylor Swift, Ammar Malik, Henry Walter
2012	B.o.B	Strange Clouds	"Arena"	Bobby Simmons Jr., Henry Walter, Christopher Brown, Clifford Harris Jr.
2012	B.o.B	Strange Clouds	"Out of My Mind (feat. Nicki Minaj)"	Bobby Simmons Jr., Mathieu Jomphe-Lepine, Jamieson Jones, Onika Maraj
2012	Adam Lambert	Trespassing	"Never Close Our Eyes"	Peter Hernandez, Philip Lawrence, Ari Levine, Henry Walter
2012	Katy Perry	Teenage Dream	"Wide Awake"	Katheryn Hudson, Karl Sandberg, Henry Walter
2012	Cody Simpson	Paradise	"Wish U Were Here (feat. Becky G)"	Jacob Cruz, Bonnie McKee, Henry Walter, Rebecca Gomez
2012	Karmin	Hello	"Brokenhearted"	Cirkut, Emily Wright
2012	Kesha	Warrior	"Die Young"	Kesha Sebert, Nate Ruess, henry Walter, Benjamin Levin
2012	Cher Lloyd	Sticks and Stones	"Oath (feat. Becky G)"	Rebecca Gomez, Ammar Malik, Daniel Omelio, Emily Wright, Henry Walter
2012	Leona Lewis	Glassheart	"Lovebird"	Bonnie McKee, Joshua Coleman
2012	One Direction	Take Me Home	"Rock Me"	Sam Hollander, Peter Svensson, Henry Walter, Allan Grigg
2012	Kesha	Warrior	"C'Mon"	Kesha Sebert, Bonnie McKee, Karl Sandberg, Henry Walter, Benjamin Levin
2012	Kesha	Warrior	"Warrior"	Kesha Sebert, Pebe Sebert, Karl Sandberg, Henry Walter
2012	Kesha	Warrior	"Thinking of You"	Kesha Sebert, K. Ahlund, D. Omelio, A. Malik, Henry Walter, Benjamin Levin
2012	Kesha	Warrior	"Crazy Kids (feat. will.i.am or Juicy J)"	Kesha Sebert, William Adams, Henry Walter, Benjmain Levin
2012	Kesha	Warrior	"Wherever You Are"	Kesha Sebert, Karl Sandberg, Henry Walter
2012	Kesha	Warrior	"Dirty Love"	Kesha Sebert, Pebe Sebert, James Osterberg Jr., Henry Walter, Matt Squire
2012	Kesha	Warrior	"Wonderland"	Kesha Sebert, Pebe Sebert, Henry Walter, Allan Grigg
2012	Kesha	Warrior	"Only Wanna Dance with You"	Kesha Sebert, Karl Sandberg, Henry Walter
2012	Kesha	Warrior	"Supernatural"	Kesha Sebert, Bonnie McKee, Karl Sandberg, Henry Walter, Nik Kershaw
2012	Kesha	Warrior	"Last Goodbye"	Kesha Sebert, Ammar Malik, Daniel Omelio, Henry Walter, Benjamin Levin
2012	Kesha	Warrior	"Gold Trans Am"	Kesha Sebert, Pebe Sebert, Henry Walter, Allan Grigg
2013	Will.i.am	willpower	"Geekin'"	William Adams, Henry Walter
2013	Will.i.am	willpower	"Fall Down (feat. Miley Cyrus)"	William Adams, Henry Walter, Benjamin Levin
2013	Will.i.am	willpower	"Far Away From Home"	William Adams, Henry Walter
2013	The Wanted	Word of Mouth	"Walks Like Rihanna"	Andy Hill, Henry Walter, Edvard Erfjord, Henrik Michelsen
2013	Becky G	Play It Again EP	"Play It Again"	R. Gomez, Karl Sandberg, Henry Walter, Joshua Coleman, N. Hollowell-Dahr
2013	Britney Spears	The Smurfs 2: Music from and Inspired By	"Ooh La La"	Bonnie McKee, Henry Walter, Joshua Coleman, Jacob Hindlin, Fransisca Hall
2013	G.R.L.	The Smurfs 2: Music from and Inspired By	"Vacation"	Bonnie McKee, Karl Sandberg, Henry Walter
2013	Juicy J	Stay Trippy	"Bounce It"	Jordan Houston, Ethan Lowry, Jacob Hindlin, Henry Walter, O. Akintimehin
2013	Robin Thicke	Blurred Lines	"Give It 2 U (feat. Kendrick Lamar)"	Robin Thicke, William Adams, Henry Walter, Kendrick Duckworth
2013	Becky G	Play It Again EP	"Can't Get Enough"	R. Gomez, Karl Sandberg, Henry Walter, Niles Hollowell-Dahr, Armando Perez
2013	Becky G	Play It Again EP	"Built for This"	Rebecca Gomez, Henry Walter, Niles Hollowell-Dahr
2013	Becky G	Play It Again EP	"Zoomin Zoomin"	Rebecca Gomez, William Adams, Henry Walter, Mathieu Jomphe-Lepine
2013	Becky G	Play It Again EP	"Lovin What You Do"	Rebecca Gomez, Henry Walter, Michael Mani, Jordan Omley
2013	3Ball MTY	Globall	"Quiero Bailar (All Through the Night) (feat. Becky G)"	Antonio Hernandez Luna, Urales Vargas
2013	Katy Perry	Prism	"Roar"	Katheryn Hudson, Bonnie McKee, Karl Sandberg, Henry Walter
2013	Miley Cyrus	Bangerz	"Wrecking Ball"	Miley Cyrus, Maureen McDonald, S. Skarbek, Stephan Moccio, Henry Walter
2013	Jessie J	Alive	"Harder We Fall"	Jessica Cornish, Ammar Malik, Daniel Omelio, Henry Walter
2013	Jessie J	Alive	"Excuse My Rude"	Jessica Cornish, R. Gomez, Ammar Malik, Henry Walter, Niles Hollowell-Dahr
2013	Jessie J	Alive	"Gold"	Jessica Cornish, Claude Kelly, Henry Walter
2013	Pitbull	Global Warming: Meltdown	"Timber (feat. Kesha)"	Armando Perez, Kesha Sebert, Pebe Sebert, Henry Walter, Jamie Sanderson
2013	Katy Perry	Prism	"Unconditionally"	Katheryn Hudson, Karl Sandberg, Henry Walter
2013	Katy Perry	Prism	"Legendary Lovers"	Katheryn Hudson, Bonnie McKee, Karl Sandberg, Henry Walter
2013	Katy Perry	Prism	"Birthday"	Katheryn Hudson, Bonnie McKee, Karl Sandberg, Henry Walter
2013	Katy Perry	Prism	"Dark Horse (feat. Juicy J)"	Katheryn Hudson, Sarah Hudson, Karl Sandberg, Henry Walter, J. Houston
2013	Katy Perry	Prism	"International Smile"	Katheryn Hudson, Karl Sandberg, Henry Walter
2013	Katy Perry	Prism	"Ghost"	Katheryn Hudson, Bonnie McKee, Karl Sandberg, Henry Walter
2013	Britney Spears	Britney Jean	"Brightest Morning Star"	Britney Spears, Sia Furler, Henry Walter
2014	Pitbull	Globalization	"Wild Wild Love (feat. G.R.L.)"	Armando Perez, Ammar Malik, Karl Sandberg, Henry Walter, Michael Everett
2014	Shakira	Shakira	"Dare (La La La)"	Shakira Ripoll, J. Singh, Karl Sandberg, Henry Walter, Mathieu Jomphe-Lepine
2014	Pitbull	One Love, One Rhythm	"We Are One (Ole Ola) (feat. Jennifer Lopez & Claudia Leitte"	Armando Perez, Sia Furler, Henry Walter, Thomas Troelsen, Nadir Khayat
2014	Jason Derulo	Talk Dirty	"Zipper"	Jason Desrouleaux, Jacob Hindlin, Sam Sumser, Chloe Angelides, Henry Walter
2014	Becky G	Non-album single	"Shower"	Rebecca Gomez, Theron Thomas, Timothy Thomas, Henry Walter
2014	Nicki Minaj	The Pinkprint	"Pills n Potions"	Onika Maraj, Ester Dean, Henry Walter
2014	G.R.L.	G.R.L. EP	"Ugly Heart"	Ryan Baharloo, John Monds, Ester Dean, Henry Walter
2014	G.R.L.	G.R.L. EP	"Show Me What You Got"	Jacob Kasher Hindlin, Karl Sandberg, Henry Walter
2014	G.R.L.	G.R.L. EP	"Rewind"	Jacob Kasher Hindlin, Ammar Malik, Karl Sandberg, Henry Walter
2014	Juicy J	Non-album single	"Low"	Jordan Houston, Th. Thomas, Ti. Thomas, Henry Walter, O. Maraj, B. Dickenson
2014	Wiz Khalifa	Blacc Hollywood	"Stayin Out All Night"	Cameron Thomaz, Henry Walter, Nicholas Ruth
2014	Yelle	Complètement fou	"Complètement fou"	Jean-Francois Perrier, Judie Budet, Jerome Echenoz, Henry Walter
2014	Maroon 5	V	"Sugar"	Adam Levine, Michael Posner, Jacob Hindlin, Henry Walter, Joshua Coleman
2014	Jack U	Skrillex & Diplo: Jack U	"Take Ü There (feat. Kiesza)"	Thomas Pentz, Sonny Moore, Kiesza Rae Ellestad, Henry Walter
2014	Enrique Iglesias	Sex and Love	I'm a Freak	Enrique Iglesias, Armando Perez
2014	Ne-Yo	Non-Fiction	"She Knows"	Shaffer Smith, Henry Walter, Jordan Houston
2014	Yelle	Complètement fou	"Coca sans bulles"	Jean-Francois Perrier, Judie Budet, Jerome Echenoz, Henry Walter, A. Vasquez
2014	Yelle	Complètement fou	"Florence en Italie"	Jean-Francois Perrier, Judie Budet, Jerome Echenoz, Henry Walter, Allan Grigg
2014	Yelle	Complètement fou	"Un jour viendra"	Jean-Francois Perrier, Judie Budet, Henry Walter
2014	Elliphant	One More EP	"Never Been in Love"	Ellinor Olovsdotter, Henry Walter, Nicholas Ruth
2014	Becky G	Non-album single	"Can't Stop Dancin'"	Rebecca Gomez, Theron Thomas, Timothy Thomas, Henry Walter, A. Vasquez
2014	R. City	Non-album single	"I'm That..."	Theron Thomas, Timothy Thomas, Henry Walter, J. Coleman, Tauheed Epps
2014	Nicki Minaj	The Pinkprint	"Only (feat. Drake, Lil Wayne & Chris Brown)"	Onika Maraj, Theron Thomas, Timothy Thomas, Henry Walter, Jeremy Coleman
2014	Pitbull	Globalization	"Time of Our Lives (feat.Ne-Yo)"	Armando Perez, Shaffer Smith, Henry Walter, Stephen Taft
2014	Pitbull	Globalization	"Sexy Beaches (feat. Chloe Angelides)"	Armando Perez, Th. Thomas, Ti. Thomas, Chloe Angelides, Henry Walter
2014	Pitbull	Globalization	"Drive You Crazy (feat. Jason Derulo & Juicy J)"	Armando Perez, Th. Thomas, Ti. Thomas, Henry Walter, Jordan Houston
2014	John Martin	Non-album single	"Anywhere For You"	John Martin, Michel Zitron
2014	Usher	Non-album single	"I Don't Mind"	U. Raymond IV, J. Hindlin, Th. Thomas, Ti. Thomas, Henry Walter, J. Houston
2014	Nicki Minaj	The Pinkprint	"Get on Your Knees"	Onika Maraj, Katheryn Hudson, Sarah Hudson, Chloe Angelides, Henry Walter
2014	Nicki Minaj	The Pinkprint	"Trini Dem Girls"	O. Maraj, J. Hindlin, Th. Thomas, Ti. Thomas, Henry Walter, Jeremy Coleman
2014	Nicki Minaj	The Pinkprint	"The Night is Still Young"	Onika Maraj, Ester Dean, Theron Thomas, Timothy Thomas, Henry Walter
2015	Fifth Harmony	Reflection	"This is How We Roll"	Katherine Nestel, Tinashe Sibanda, Mike Molina, Theron Thomas, Henry Walter
2015	Becky G	Non-album single	"Lovin' So Hard"	Rebecca Gomez, Ester Dean, Henry Walter, J. Coleman, Niles Hollowell-Dahr
2015	Flo Rida	My House EP	"Once in a Lifetime"	Tramar Dillard, Gamal Lewis, Jacob Hindlin, Henry Walter, Joshua Coleman
2015	Juicy J	Non-album single	"For Everybody"	Cameron Thomaz, Henry Walter, Jordan Houston, Theron Thomas, Timothy Thomas
2015	Ciara	Jackie	"Lullaby"	Ciara Harris, Gamal Lewis, Theron Thomas, Henry Walter, Antoine Macon
2015	Ciara	Jackie	"Dance like We're Making Love"	Ciara Harris, Theron Thomas, Timothy Thomas, Henry Walter
2015	Ciara	Jackie	"Give Me Love"	Ciara Harris, Jacob Kasher Hindlin, Gamal Lewis, Theron Thomas, Henry Walter
2015	Ciara	Jackie	"Kiss & Tell"	Theron Thomas, Henry Walter
2015	Thalía	Amore Mío	"Como Tú No Hay Dos (Feat. Becky G)"	A. Matheus, Rebbeca Marie Gomez
2015	Rick Ross	Black Market	"Silk Road"	Cirkut
2015	Elliphant	Living Life Golden	"Love Me Badder"	Ellinor Olovsdotter, Theron Thomas, Henry Walter, Thomas Tysper
2015	Phoebe Ryan	Mine	"Ignition/Do You"	R. Kelly
2015	G.R.L.	Non-album single	"Lighthouse"	Rock City, Henry Walter
2015	R. City	What Dreams Are Made Of	"Locked Away"	Theron Thomas, Timothy Thomas, Henry Walter, Toni Tennille
2015	LunchMoney Lewis	Non-album single	"Whip It!"	Gamal Lewis, J. Hindlin, Chloe Angelides, H. Walter, M. Silbey, N. Cunningham
2015	Becky G	Non-album single	"Break a Sweat"	Rebecca Gomez, Emily Schwartz, Chloe Angelides, Gamal Lewis, Henry Walter
2015	R. City	What Dreams Are Made Of	"Make Up"	Theron Thomas, Timothy Thomas, Henry Walter, Chloe Angelides, Gamal Lewis
2015	R. City	What Dreams Are Made Of	"Like This"	Theron Thomas, Timothy Thomas, Henry Walter
2015	R. City	What Dreams Are Made Of	"Checking for You"	Theron Thomas, Timothy Thomas, Henry Walter, Salaam Remi
2015	R. City	What Dreams Are Made Of	"Take You Down"	Theron Thomas, Timothy Thomas, Henry Walter, Eric Frederic
2015	R. City	What Dreams Are Made Of	"Broadway"	Th. Thomas, Ti. Thomas, Henry Walter, Salaam Remi, B. Levy, Paul Love
2015	R. City	What Dreams Are Made Of	"Over"	Theron Thomas, Timothy Thomas, Henry Walter, Lenny Kravitz
2015	R. City	What Dreams Are Made Of	"Again"	Theron Thomas, Timothy Thomas, Henry Walter
2015	R. City	What Dreams Are Made Of	"Live By the Gun"	Th. Thomas, Ti. Thomas, Henry Walter, Melvin Hough II, Riveino Wouter
2015	R. City	What Dreams Are Made Of	"Slave to the Dollar"	Theron Thomas, Timothy Thomas, Henry Walter, Cameron Wallace
2015	R. City	What Dreams Are Made Of	"Save My Soul"	Theron Thomas, Timothy Thomas, Henry Walter
2015	R. City	What Dreams Are Made Of	"Crazy Love"	Th. Thomas, Ti. Thomas, Henry Walter, Stephen Kozmeniuk, D. Chin-Chee
2015	R. City	What Dreams Are Made Of	"Don't You Worry"	Theron Thomas, Timothy Thomas, Henry Walter
2015	R. City	What Dreams Are Made Of	"Our Story"	Theron Thomas, Timothy Thomas, Henry Walter, Jevon Hill
2015	Becky G	Non-album single	"You Love It"	Rebecca Gomez, Theron Thomas, Henry Walter
2015	LunchMoney Lewis	Non-album single	"Ain't Too Cool"	Gamal Lewis, Jacob Hindlin, Henry Walter, Eric Frederic, John Gomez
2015	R. Kelly	The Buffet	"Marching Band"	Robert Kelly, Gamal Lewis, Ryan Ogren, Henry Walter, J. Coleman, J. Houston
2016	Elliphant	Living Life Golden	"Everybody"	Ellinor Olovsdotter, Theron Thomas, Henry Walter, Azealia Banks
2016	Jennifer Lopez	Non-album single	"Ain't Your Mama"	Meghan Trainor, Gamal Lewis, Jacob Hindlin, Theron Thomas, Henry Walter
2016	Zeds Dead	Northern Lights	"Blame"	Dylan Mamid, Z. Rapp-Rovan, T. Pentz, Ellinor Olosdotter, Thomas Tysper
2016	Pitbull	Climate Change	"Greenlight (feat. Flo Rida & LunchMoney Lewis)"	Armando Perez, Gamal Lewis, Henry Walter, Tramar Dillard
2016	Pusha T	The Land OST	"Paid"	Terrence Thornton, Jeremy Felton, Gamal Lewis, Henry Walter
2016	DJ Fresh	Non-album single	"Bang Bang"	Daniel Stein, Thomas Pentz, Th. Thomas, Ti. Thomas, Henry Walter
2017	Baby E	Kill the Noise	"Need Me"	Ethan Lowery, Henry Walter
2017	SeeB	Non-album single	"Under Your Skin"	Simen Eriksrud, Espen Berg, Gamal Lewis, Chloe Angelides, Henry Walter
2017	Trey Songz	Tremaine the Album	"Animal"	T. Neverson, Gamal Lewis, Theron Thomas, Henry Walter, Jeremy Coleman
2017	Trey Songz	Tremaine the Album	"Priceless"	T. Neverson, Theron Thomas, Henry Walter, Jeremy Coleman, Ryan Ogren
2017	Ne-Yo	Non-album single	"Another Love Song"	Shaffer Smith, Henry Walter
2017	Big Boi	Boomiverse	"All Night"	Antwan Patton, Gamal Lewis, Chloe Angelides, Henry Walter, Griffin Oskar
2017	Kim Petras	The Summer I Couldn't Do Better	"I Don't Want It at All"	Kim Petras, Aaron Puckett, Henry Walter, Aaron Aguilar
2017	Kim Petras	The Summer I Couldn't Do Better	"Hillside Boys"	Kim Petras, Aaron Aguilar, Jonathan Castelli
2017	Kim Petras	The Summer I Couldn't Do Better	"Hills"	Kim Petras, Aaron Aguilar, Brandon Hamlin, Ethan Lowery
2017	Fergie	Double Dutchess	"A Little Work"	Fergie Duhamel, Theron Thomas, Timothy Thomas, Henry Walter
2017	Kyle	Non-album single	"Off of It"	Kyle Harvey, Gamal Lewis, Henry Walter, Tyrone Griffin Jr.
2017	Kim Petras	The Summer I Couldn't Do Better	"Slow It Down"	Kim Petras, Henry Walter, Aaron Aguilar, Allan Grigg
2017	Kim Petras	The Summer I Couldn't Do Better	"Faded"	Kim Petras, Aaron Aguilar, Aaron Jennings, Noel Fisher
2018	Kim Petras	The Summer I Couldn't Do Better	"Heart to Break"	Kim Petras, Jacob Kasher Hindlin, Henry Walter, Aaron Aguilar
2018	Sophia Black	Non-album single	"Blessed"	Sophie Black, Gamal Lewis, Joshua Portillo
2018	Lil Aaron	Rockstar Famous EP	"4 Life"	Aaron Puckett, Nicholas Bailey, Ryan Ogren
2018	Lil Aaron	Rockstar Famous EP	"Anymore"	Aaron Puckett, Kim Petras, Dallas Koehlke, Ryan Ogren, Brandon Hamlin
2018	Lil Aaron	Rockstar Famous EP	"Makin' Money"	Aaron Puckett, Gamal Lewis, Kiara Saulters, Henry Walter
2018	Lil Aaron	Rockstar Famous EP	"Quit"	Aaron Puckett, Ryan Ogren, Dallas Koehlke
2018	Lil Aaron	Rockstar Famous EP	"Stunt"	Aaron Puckett, Daniel Omelio, Brandon Hamlin
2018	Lil Aaron	Rockstar Famous EP	"Sometimes"	Aaron Puckett, Nicholas Bailey, Ryan Ogren
2018	Kim Petras	The Summer I Couldn't Do Better	"Can't Do Better"	Kim Petras, Henry Walter, Aaron Aguilar, Jonatan Castelli
2018	Ne-Yo	Good Man	"Nights Like These"	Shaffer Smith, Henry Walter, Mathieu Jomphe-Lepine, Anthony Santos
2018	Ne-Yo	Good Man	"On Ur Mind"	Shaffer Smith, Henry Walter, Jahron Brathwaite
2018	Ne-Yo	Good Man	"Ocean Sure"	Shaffer Smith, Henry Walter, Samuel Jean
2018	Sophie Rose	Non-album single	"Famous"	Sophie Rose, Henry Walter, Sam F
2018	Iggy Azalea	Non-album single	"Savior"	Amethyst "Iggy Azalea" Kelly, Lisa Stansfield, Henry Walter, Verse Simmonds
2018	Azealia Banks	Fantasea II	"Treasure Island"	Azealia Banks, Kevin Hussein, Henry Walter
2018	Kim Petras	The Summer I Couldn't Do Better	"All the Time"	Kim Petras, Henry Walter, Aaron Aguilar
2018	lil aaron & Goody Grace	WORST CHRISTMAS EVER	"ALL I NEED"	Travis Landon Barker, Scott Andrew Effman, Branson "Goody Grace" Gudmundson, Aaron Jennings "lil aaron" Puckett, Theron Makiel "Theron Theron" Thomas
2018	Ivy Adara	Intraduction	"Famous"	Ivy Adara, Jon Hume, Lindsey Jackson
2018	Ivy Adara	Intraduction	"Currency"	Ivy Adara, Jon Hume, Lindsey Jackson
2018	Ivy Adara	Intraduction	"Rebels"	Ivy Adara, Jon Hume, Lindsey Jackson
2018	Ivy Adara	Intraduction	"Callgirl"	Ivy Adara, Jon Hume
2018	Ivy Adara	Intraduction	"Lies"	Ivy Adara, Jon Hume, Henry Walter
2018	Baby E	TBA	"Trapper of the Year"	Ethan Lowery, Ryan Ogren, Benjamin Diehl
2018	Baby E	TBA	"Trappin' 4 a Livin'"	Ethan Lowery, Theron Thomas, Benjamin Diehl
2019	Big Boi	Non-album single	"Doin' It"	Antwan Patton, Theron Thomas, Renegade El Rey, Patrick Brown
2019	Kim Petras	The Summer I Couldn't Do Better	"If U Think About Me..."	Kim Petras, Aaron Aguilar, Alexander Vasquez
2019	Kim Petras	The Summer I Couldn't Do Better	"Homework"	Kim Petras, Aaron Puckett, Ethan Lowery, Aaron Aguilar
2019	Kim Petras	The Summer I Couldn't Do Better	"1, 2, 3 Dayz Up"	Kim Petras, Aaron Puckett, Aaron Aguilar, Sophie Xeon
2019	Tyga	Legendary	"Haute (feat.J Balvin & Chris Brown)"	Michael Stevenson, Christopher Brown, Brandon Hamlin, Jose Balvin
2019	Kim Petras	Clarity	"Clarity"	Kim Petras, Aaron Jennings, Aaron Aguilar, Brandon Hamlin
2019	Kim Petras	Clarity	"Icy"	Kim Petras, Theron Thomas, Aaron Aguilar, Vaughn Oliver
2019	Kim Petras	Clarity	"Got My Number"	Kim Petras, Aaron Jennings, Aaron Aguilar, Jussi Karvinen
2019	Kim Petras	Clarity	"Sweet Spot"	Kim Petras, Theron Thomas, Aaron Aguilar, Vaughn Oliver
2019	Kim Petras	Clarity	"Personal Hell"	Kim Petras, Theron Thomas, Madison Love, Aaron Aguilar, Vaughn Oliver
2019	Kim Petras	Clarity	"Broken"	Kim Petras, Theron Thomas, Aaron Aguilar, Brandon Hamlin, Benjamin Diehl
2019	Kim Petras	Clarity	"All I Do Is Cry"	Kim Petras, Aaron Aguilar, Nicholas Balding
2019	Kim Petras	Clarity	"Do Me"	Kim Petras, Theron Thomas, Aaron Aguilar, Vaughn Oliver
2019	Kim Petras	Clarity	"Meet the Parents"	Kim Petras, Aaron Jennings, Aaron Aguilar
2019	Kim Petras	Clarity	"Another One"	Kim Petras, Theron Thomas, Madison Love, Aaron Aguilar
2019	Kim Petras	Clarity	"Blow It All"	Kim Petras, Theron Thomas, Ryan Ogren, Aaron Aguilar
2019	Kim Petras	Clarity	"Shinin'"	Kim Petras, Aaron Jennings, Theron Thomas, Aaron Aguilar
2019	Doja Cat	Amala / Hot Pink	"Juicy"	Amala Dlamini, Lydia Asrat, David Sprecher
2019	Kim Petras	Turn Off the Light	"Purgatory"	Kim Petras, Aaron Aguilar, Vaughn Oliver
2019	Kim Petras	Turn Off the Light	"There Will Be Blood"	Kim Petras, Theron Thomas, Jesse Geller, Aaron Aguilar, Vaughn Oliver
2019	Kim Petras	Turn Off the Light	"Bloody Valentine"	Kim Petras, Aaron Aguilar, Vaughn Oliver
2019	Kim Petras	Turn Off the Light	"Wrong Turn"	Kim Petras, Theron Thomas, Jesse Geller, Aaron Aguilar, Vaughn Oliver
2019	Kim Petras	Turn Off the Light	"Demons"	Kim Petras, Aaron Aguilar, Vaughn Oliver
2019	Kim Petras	Turn Off the Light	"Massacre"	Kim Petras, Theron Thomas, Jesse Geller, Aaron Aguilar, Vaughn Oliver
2019	Kim Petras	Turn Off the Light	"Knives"	Kim Petras, Aaron Aguilar, Vaughn Oliver
2019	Kim Petras	Turn Off the Light	"Death By Sex"	Kim Petras, Aaron Puckett, Aaron Aguilar, Brandon Hamlin
2019	Kim Petras	Turn Off the Light	"Omen"	Kim Petras, Aaron Aguilar, Vaughn Oliver
2019	Kim Petras	Turn Off the Light	"Close Your Eyes"	Kim Petras, Sarah Hudson, Jesse Geller, Aaron Aguilar
2019	Kim Petras	Turn Off the Light	"Transylvania"	Kim Petras, Aaron Aguilar, Vaughn Oliver
2019	Kim Petras	Turn Off the Light	"Turn Off the Light"	Kim Petras, Sarah Hudson, Jesse Geller, Aaron Aguilar
2019	Kim Petras	Turn Off the Light	"Tell Me It's a Nightmare"	Kim Petras, Sarah Hudson, Jesse Geller, Aaron Aguilar
2019	Kim Petras	Turn Off the Light	"I Don't Wanna Die..."	Kim Petras, Jesse Geller, Aaron Aguilar, Vaughn Oliver
2019	Kim Petras	Turn Off the Light	"In the Next Life"	Kim Petras, Sarah Hudson, Jesse Geller, Aaron Aguilar
2019	Kim Petras	Turn Off the Light	"Boo! Bitch!"	Kim Petras, Jesse Geller, Aaron Aguilar, Vaughn Oliver
2019	Kim Petras	Turn Off the Light	"Everybody Dies"	Kim Petras, Theron Thomas, Jesse Geller, Aaron Aguilar
2020	Doja Cat	Hot Pink	"Rules"	Dlamini, Lydia Asrat, Theron Thomas, Ben Billions, Salaam Remi
2020	Doja Cat	Hot Pink	"Say So"	Dlamini, Yeti Beats, Lydia Asrat
2020	Doja Cat	Hot Pink	"Like That (feat. Gucci Mane)"	Dlamini, Radric Delantic Davis, Yeti Beats, Lydia Asrat, Theron Thomas
2020	Doja Cat	Hot Pink	"Shine"	Dlamini, Yeti Beats
2020	Kim Petras	Non-album single	"Reminds Me"	Petras, Sean Small, Sam Summer, Aaron Joseph
2020	Kim Petras	Non-album single	"Malibu"	Petras, Aaron Joseph, Vaughn Oliver, Sophia Black, Jon Castelli, Allan Grigg
2020	Doja Cat	Non-album single	"Say So Remix (feat. Nicki Minaj)"	Dlamini, Yeti Beats, Lydia Asrat, Onika Maraj
2020	Benny Mayne	Non-album single	"Hokey Pokey"	Benjamin Shumen, Brandon Hamlin, Kenny Sharp, Ryan Ogren
2020	Kygo	Golden Hour	"Broken Glass (feat. Kim Petras)"	Kyrre Gørvell-Dahll, Petras, Joseph, Chloe Angelides, Fransisca Hall, Sam Sumser, Sean Small
2020	Lil Wayne	Funeral	"Shimmy (feat. Doja Cat)"	Carter, Dlamini, Nicole, Plummer, Flores, Ferrel, Thomas, Hamlin, Ogren, Diggs, Jones
2020	All Time Low	Wake Up, Sunshine	"Sleeping In"	Max Martin
2020	Saweetie	Pretty Bitch Music	"Tap In"	Shaw, Thomas, Jefferson, Smith, Phillips, Lewis, Love, Harper
2020	Juice Wrld	Legends Never Die	"Wishing Well"	Higgins, Darrel Jackson
2020	DaBaby	Blame It On Baby	"Blind (feat. Young Thug)"	Kirk, Glass
2020	Saweetie	Pretty Bitch Music	"Tap In Remix (feat. DaBaby, Post Malone & Jack Harlow)"	Kirk, Post, Harlow, Shaw, Thomas, Jefferson, Smith, Phillips, Lewis, Love, Harper
2020	Lourdiz	Non-album single	"Somersault"	Theron Thomas, Alyssa Lourdiz Cantu
2020	Miles Wesley	Non-album single	"Neighborhood"	Christian Dold, Miles Shepperd, Rocco Valdes
2020	The Kid Laroi	F*ck Love: Savage	"F*ck you, Goodbye (feat. Machine Gun Kelly)"	Charlton Howard, Richard Colson Baker, Ryan Ogren
2020	Lourdiz	Non-album single	"Za za"	Theron Thomas, Alyssa Lourdiz Cantu, Rick Witherspoon
2020	Juice WRLD	Non-album single	"Reminds Me of You (feat. The Kid Laroi)"	Jarad Anthony Higgins, Kim Petras, Charlton Howard, Aaron Joseph, Theron Thomas, Sam Sumser, Sean Small
2021	Saweetie	Pretty Bitch Music	"Best Friend feat. Doja Cat"	Dlamini, Harper, Theron Thomas, Valdes, Asia Smith, Alyssa Lourdiz Cantu, Kaine
2021	Kimberose	Out	"Sober"	Joy Oladokun, Olubukola Ayodele
2021	Lourdiz	Non-album single	"Circles"	Alyssa Cantu, Theron Thomas
2021	Tay Money	Non-album single	"Asthma Pump" (feat. Flo Milli)	Taylor Watson, Tamia Carter, Gamal Lewis
2021	Doja Cat	Planet Her	“Kiss Me More (feat. SZA)"	Dlamini, Solana Rowe, Tizhimself, David Sprecher, Rogét Chahayed, Carter Lang, Gerard A. Powell II, Stephen Kipner, Terry Shaddick
2021	Doja Cat	Planet Her	“Need to Know"	Dlamini
2021	Doja Cat	Planet Her	"You Right (feat. the Weeknd)"	Dlamini, Abel Tesfaye
2021	Doja Cat	Planet Her	"Tonight"	Taneisha Jackson, Eve Jihan Cooper, Rob Tewlow
2021	Doja Cat	Planet Her	"Woman"	Dlamini
2021	Lourdiz	Non-album single	"Shoot Me Down"	Ryan Ogren, Alyssa Lourdiz Cantu, Brandon Hamlin
2021	Kim Petras	Non-album single	"Future Starts Now"	Aaron Aguilar, Aaron Jennings, Alex Chapman, Kim Petras, Vaughn Oliver
2021	Young Thug	Non-album single	"Tick Tock"	Jeffery Williams, Rocco Valdes
2021	Latto	777	"Big Energy"	Alyssa Stephens, Vaughn Oliver, Theron Thomas, Asia Smith, Adrian Belew, Christopher Frantz, Steven Stanley, Tina Weymouth, Randall Hammers, Jaucquez Lowe
2021	Lourdiz	Non-album single	"Get Along (feat. Shenseea)"	Ryan Ogren, Alyssa Lourdiz Cantu, Brandon Hamlin, Chinsea Lee, Kaine, Mike Crook
2021	Fletcher	Non-album single	"Girls Girls Girls"	Cathy Dennis, FLETCHER, Max Martin, Jonas W. Karlsson, Kito, Madison Love, Katy Perry, Mary Weitz
2021	Nashe	With Love	"Rain"	Henry Russell Walter, Theron Thomas, Timothy Thomas
2021	Saweetie	Pretty Bitch Music	"Icy Chain"	Aaron Jennings, Diamonté Harper, Randall Hammers, Rocco Valdes
2021	Kim Petras	Feed the Beast	"Coconuts"	Aaron Jennings, Aaron Joseph, Cedric de Saint-Rome, Kim Petras, Rocco Valdes, Ryan Ogren, Vaughn Oliver
2021	Juice Wrld	Fighting Demons	"Not Enough"	Jarad Anthony Higgins, Chris Barnett, Keegan Bach, Justin Craig, Pierre DeJournette
2021	B-Case & Robin Schulz	Non-album single	"Can't Buy Love (Feat. Baby E)"	B-Case, Baby E, Ben Billions, Ryan OG
2022	A1 LaFlare	Non-album single	"Wootie Woot"	Asia Smith, Rocco Valdes
2022	Coi Leray	Non-album single	"Anxiety"	Alyssa Lourdiz Cantu, Coi Leray, Lil Aaron, Rocco Valdes, Ryan Ogren
2022	Kim Petras	Slut Pop	"Slut Pop"	Aaron Jennings, Aaron Joseph, Kim Petras, Rocco Valdes, Ryan Ogren
2022	Kim Petras	Slut Pop	"Treat Me Like A Slut"	Aaron Jennings, Aaron Joseph, Kim Petras, Rocco Valdes
2022	Kim Petras	Slut Pop	"XXX"	Aaron Joseph, Alex Chapman, Chloe Angelides, Kim Petras, Rocco Valdes, Ryan Ogren
2022	Kim Petras	Slut Pop	"Superpower Bitch"	Kim Petras, Rocco Valdes, Ryan Ogren
2022	Kim Petras	Slut Pop	"Throat Goat"	Kim Petras, Rocco Valdes, Ryan Ogren
2022	Kim Petras	Slut Pop	"They Wanna Fuck"	Aaron Joseph, Alex Chapman, Chloe Angelides, Kim Petras
2022	Kim Petras	Slut Pop	"Your Wish Is My Command"	Aaron Joseph, Kim Petras
2022	Shenseea	Alpha	"R U That"	CHINSEA LEE, Donny Flores, Shéyaa Bin Abraham-Joseph, Theron Thomas
2022	Tyga & Doja Cat	Non-album single	"Freaky Deaky"	Alyssa Lourdiz Cantu, Amala Dlamini, Brandon Hamlin, Michael Stevenson, Mike Crook, Ryan Ogren, Suzanne Vega
2022	Sueco	It Was Fun While It Lasted	"It Was Fun While It Lasted"	Asia Smith, Charlton Howard, David Wilson, Lil Aaron, Mark Hoppus, Orion Meshorer, Richard Baker, Ryan Ogren, Theron Thomas, Thomas DeLonge, Travis Baker, William Henry Schulz
2022	Coi Leray & Nicki Minaj	Non-album single	"Blick Blick"	A1 LaFlare, Coi Leray, Kaine, Mike Crook, Nicki Minaj, Randal Hammers, Rocco Valdes, Ryan Ogren
2022	Joy Oladokun	TBA	"Purple Haze"	Joy Oladokun
2022	Flo Milli	You Still Here, Ho?	"Big Steppa"	Aaron Joseph Aguilar, Joshua Baker, Tamia Monique Carter, Randall Avery Hammers, Theron Makiel Thomas
2022	Baby E	TBA	"broken."	Ethan Philip "Baby E" Lowery
2022	Big Boss Vette, Flo Milli & Saucy Santana	TBA	"Snatched (Remix)"	Tamia Monique "Flo Milli" Carter, Justin Michael "Saucy Santana" Harris, Derryl Keith "DJ Beatz" Howard, Diamond Alexxis "Big Boss Vette" Smith, Maurice Delano "Reace Beatz" Wilson, Kevin Germaine "I Am Kevo" Yancey Jr.
2022	Nicki Minaj	Pink Friday 2	"Super Freaky Girl"	Aaron Joseph, Alonzo Miller, Gamal Lewis, Lauren Miller, Onika Maraj, Rick James, Vaughn Oliver
2022	Big Boss Vette & SleazyWorld Go	TBA	"How TF"	Keegan Christopher "KBeaZy" Bach, Joseph "SleazyWorld Go" Isaac, Gamal Kosh "LunchMoney" Lewis, Diamond Alexxis "Big Boss Vette" Smith, Kevin Germaine "I Am Kevo" Yancey Jr.
2022	Jnr Choi	Non-album single	"Tick Tock"	Jnr Choi, Rocco Valdes, Theron Theron
2022	Big Boss Vette	Non-album single	"Pretty Girls Walk"	Diamond Smith, Gamal Lewis, Rocco Valdes, Theron Thomas
2022	ELENA ROSE, Greeicy, María Becerra, Becky G & TINI	Non-album single	"La Ducha (Remix)"	María de los Ángeles Becerra, Greeicy Yeliana Rendón Ceballos, Rebbeca Marie "Becky G" Gomez, Andrea Elena "ELENA ROSE" Mangiamarchi, Martina Stoessel "TINI" Muzlera, Rafael Alfonso "Rafa" Rodríguez, Daniel Ignacio Rondon, Theron Makiel "Theron Theron" Thomas, Timothy Jamahli "A.I." Thomas, Henry Russell "Cirkut" Walter, Christian Mauricio Aloisio Zavala
2022	A1 LaFlare	Non-album single	"Paying Off"	Asia Tichun Ru "A1 LaFlare" Smith
2022	LU KALA	No Tears On This Ride	"Pretty Girl Era"	Lusamba Vanessa "LU KALA" Kalala, Madison Emiko Love, Rocco "Rocco Did It Again!" Valdes
2023	Latto & LU KALA	TBA	"Lottery"	Brandon Michael Benjamin, Lauren Kelly "Lauren LaRue" Grieve, Randall Avery Hammers, Stephenie Nicole "Steph" Jones, Lusamba Vanessa "LU KALA" Kalala, Gamal Kosh "LunchMoney" Lewis, Alyssa Michelle "Latto" Stephens, Rocco "Rocco Did It Again!" Valdes
2023	Saucy Santana	TBA	"1-800-Bad-Bxtch"	Justin Michael "Saucy Santana" Harris, Gamal Kosh "LunchMoney" Lewis, Rocco "Rocco Did It Again!" Valdes, Mareo Lamon Williams
2023	Big Boss Vette	Non-album single	"Problem"	Randall Avery Hammers, Diamond Alexxis "Big Boss Vette" Smith, Rocco "Rocco Did It Again!" Valdes
2023	Kim Petras & Nicki Minaj	Feed the Beast	"Alone"	Aaron Joseph Aguilar, Eelke A. Kalberg, Onika Tanya "Nicki Minaj" Maraj-Petty, Sebastiaan Molijn, Ryan John "OG" Ogren, Rocco "Rocco Did It Again!" Valdes
2023	Quinn XCII	The People's Champ	"Georgia Peach"	Mikael Marvin "Quinn XCII" Temrowski & Rocco "Rocco Did It Again!" Valdes
2023	Tyga	TBA	"Day One"	Aaron Joseph Aguilar, Cedric "Housefly" de Saint-Rome, Randall Avery Hammers, Micheal Ray "Tyga" Stevenson, Rocco "Rocco Did It Again!" Valdes
2023	Lil Durk & J. Cole	Almost Healed	"All My Life"	Durk Derrick "Lil Durk" Banks, Jermaine Lamarr "J. Cole" Cole, Gamal Kosh "LunchMoney" Lewis, Ryan John "OG" Ogren, Theron Makiel "Theron Theron" Thomas, Rocco "Rocco Did It Again!" Valdes
2023	Lil Durk & Morgan Wallen	Almost Healed	"Stand by Me"	Durk Derrick "Lil Durk" Banks, Ernest Keith "ERNEST" Smith, Ryan "Charlie Handsome" Vojtesak & Morgan Cole Wallen
2023	Lourdiz	Non-album single	"All My Bitches"	Alyssa Lourdiz Cantu, Ryan John "OG" Ogren
2023	Big Boss Vette & Omah Lay	METRO BOOMIN PRESENTS SPIDER-MAN: ACROSS THE SPIDER-VERSE (SOUNDTRACK FROM AND INSPIRED BY THE MOTION PICTURE)	"I Can't Stop"	Stanley Omah "Lay" Didia, Peter Joseph Fenn, Brandon "B HAM" Hamlin, Randall Avery Hammers, Gamal Kosh "LunchMoney" Lewis, Diamond Alexxis "Big Boss Vette" Smith, Rocco "Rocco Did It Again!" Valdes
2023	Kim Petras	Feed the Beast	"Feed the Beast"	Brandon Treyshun "Trey" Campbell, Mathieu "Billboard" Jomphe-Lépine, Kim Petras
2023	Kim Petras	Feed the Beast	"Thousand Pieces"	Max Paul Albert "Fat Max Gsus" Grahn, Anne Kristine Linnet, Kim Petras, Karl Martin "Max Martin" Sandberg
2023	Kim Petras	Feed the Beast	"Revelations"	Aaron Joseph Aguilar, Vaughn Richard Oliver, Kim Petras
2023	Kim Petras	Feed the Beast	"Sex Talk"	Aaron Joseph Aguilar, Ryan John "OG" Ogren, Vaughn Richard Oliver, Kim Petras, Rocco "Rocco Did It Again!" Valdes
2023	Kim Petras	Feed the Beast	"Hit It from the Back"	Aaron Joseph Aguilar, Esther Renay "Ester" Dean, Vaughn Richard Oliver, Kim Petras
2023	glaive	Sessions for glaive's debut album i care so much that i don't care at all	"dr. luke song"	Ash Blue "glaive" Gutierrez
2023	Big Boss Vette	RESILIENCE	"Another One"	Gamal Kosh "LunchMoney" Lewis, Diamond Alexxis "Big Boss Vette" Smith, Rocco "Rocco Did It Again!" Valdes
2023	Big Boss Vette	RESILIENCE	"Get It"	Diamond Alexxis "Big Boss Vette" Smith, Rocco "Rocco Did It Again!" Valdes, Kevin Germaine "I Am Kevo" Yancey Jr.
2023	Big Boss Vette	RESILIENCE	"Ghetto Love"	Asia Tichun Ru "A1 LaFlare" Smith, Diamond Alexxis "Big Boss Vette" Smith, Rocco "Rocco Did It Again!" Valdes, Kevin Germaine "I Am Kevo" Yancey Jr.
2023	Big Boss Vette	RESILIENCE	"Dollas"	Diamond Alexxis "Big Boss Vette" Smith, Theron Makiel "Theron Theron" Thomas, Rocco "Rocco Did It Again!" Valdes, Kevin Germaine "I Am Kevo" Yancey Jr.
2023	Big Boss Vette	RESILIENCE	"Lick the Cat"	Randall Avery Hammers, Diamond Alexxis "Big Boss Vette" Smith, Rocco "Rocco Did It Again!" Valdes
2023	Cordae	TBA	"Make Up Your Mind"	Cordae Amari Dunston, Gamal Kosh "LunchMoney" Lewis, Theron Makiel "Theron Theron" Thomas, Rocco "Rocco Did It Again!" Valdes
2023	Polo G	Hood Poet	"Barely Holdin' On"	Taurus Tremani "Polo G" Bartlett, Noah D. Goldstein, Joshua Howard "Southside" Luellen
2023	Trinity	Non-album single	"Hot Girls"	Michael Louis "Mike" Crook, Ryan John "OG" Ogren, Trinity Marie Mays, Asia Tichun Ru "A1 LaFlare" Smith
2023	Kim Petras	Problématique	"Problématique"	Aaron Joseph Aguilar, Chloe Christina Angelides, Alex Keith Chapman, Vaughn Richard "U-Tern" Oliver, Kim Petras
2023	Kim Petras	Problématique	"Je T'Adore"	Aaron Joseph Aguilar, Alex Keith Chapman, Vaughn Richard "U-Tern" Oliver, Kim Petras, Kelly Marie "Madame Buttons" Sheehan
2023	Kim Petras & Paris Hilton	Problématique	"All She Wants"	Aaron Joseph Aguilar, Alex Keith Chapman, Paris Whitney Hilton, Vaughn Richard "U-Tern" Oliver, Kim Petras, Aaron Jennings "lil aaron" Puckett
2023	Kim Petras	Problématique	"Born Again"	Aaron Joseph Aguilar, Chloe Christina Angelides, Alex Keith Chapman, Vaughn Richard "U-Tern" Oliver, Kim Petras
2023	Kim Petras	Problématique	"Something About U"	Aaron Joseph Aguilar, Alex Keith Chapman, Vaughn Richard "U-Tern" Oliver, Kim Petras
2023	Kim Petras	Problématique	"Treat Me like a Ho"	Aaron Joseph Aguilar, Ryan John "OG" Ogren, Kim Petras, Rocco "Rocco Did It Again!" Valdes
2023	Kim Petras	Problématique	"Confession"	Aaron Joseph Aguilar, Vaughn Richard "U-Tern" Oliver, Kim Petras, Aaron Jennings "lil aaron" Puckett
2023	Kim Petras	Problématique	"Deeper"	Aaron Joseph Aguilar, Alex Keith Chapman, Eric Lee "Socialchair" Cross, Vaughn Richard "U-Tern" Oliver, Kim Petras
2023	Kim Petras	Problématique	"Dirty Things"	Aaron Joseph Aguilar, Chloe Christina Angelides, Alex Keith Chapman, Vaughn Richard "U-Tern" Oliver, Kim Petras
2023	Kim Petras	Problématique	"Love Ya Leave Ya"	Aaron Joseph Aguilar, Vaughn Richard "U-Tern" Oliver, Kim Petras
2023	LU KALA	No Tears On This Ride	"Hotter Now"	Nathan Cunningham, Lusamba Vanessa "LU KALA" Kalala, James Matthew "Boy Matthews" Norton, Vaughn Richard "U-Tern" Oliver, Marc Raymond Ernest Sibley
2023	Snow Wife & Big Boss Vette	Queen Degenerate	"HIT IT"	Sam "Slush Puppy" Catalano, Stephenie Nicole "Steph" Jones, David Andrew Pramik, Diamond Alexxis "Big Boss Vette" Smith, Emily Leann "Snow Wife" Snow
2023	Snow Wife	Queen Degenerate	"ON FIRE"	Sam "Slush Puppy" Catalano, Emily Leann "Snow Wife" Snow, Rocco "Rocco Did It Again!" Valdes
2023	Snow Wife	Queen Degenerate	"I LOVE DRUGS"	Sam "Slush Puppy" Catalano, Nicasio Arden "Nico" Fabito, Emily Leann "Snow Wife" Snow
2023	Lil Durk, J. Cole & Burna Boy	All My Life (Remixes)	"All My Life (Burna Boy Remix)"	Durk Derrick "Lil Durk" Banks, Jermaine Lamarr "J. Cole" Cole, Gamal Kosh "LunchMoney" Lewis, Ryan John "OG" Ogren, Damini Ebunoluwa "Burna Boy" Ogulu, Theron Makiel "Theron Theron" Thomas, Rocco "Rocco Did It Again!" Valdes
2023	Lil Durk, J. Cole & Stray Kids	All My Life (Remixes)	"All My Life (Stray Kids Remix)"	Durk Derrick "Lil Durk" Banks, Seo Chang Bin, Bahng Christopher "Bang" Chan, Jermaine Lamarr "J. Cole" Cole, Gamal Kosh "LunchMoney" Lewis, Ryan John "OG" Ogren, Han Ji Sung, Theron Makiel "Theron Theron" Thomas, Rocco "Rocco Did It Again!" Valdes
2023	City Girls & Kim Petras	RAW	"Flashy"	Aaron Joseph Aguilar, Keegan Christopher "KBeaZy" Bach, Caresha Romeka "Yung Miami" Brownlee, Jatavia Shakara "JT" Johnson, Theron Makiel "Theron Theron" Thomas, Rocco "Rocco Did It Again!" Valdes
2023	Nicki Minaj & Lourdiz	Pink Friday 2	"Cowgirl"	Alyssa Lourdiz Cantu, Onika Tanya "Nicki Minaj" Maraj-Petty, Ryan John "OG" Ogren, Rocco "Rocco Did It Again!" Valdes
2024	LU KALA	Non-album single	"Nothing but Love"	Elizabeth Lowell Boland, Jonas Jeberg, Lusamba Vanessa "LU KALA" Kalala, Herag "Sandbagmusic" Sanbalian
2024	Kim Petras	Slut Pop Miami	"Slut Pop Reprise"	Aaron Joseph Aguilar, Ryan John "OG" Ogren, Kim Petras, Rocco "Rocco Did It Again!" Valdes
2024	Kim Petras	Slut Pop Miami	"Gag on It"	Aaron Joseph Aguilar, Ryan John "OG" Ogren, Kim Petras, Aaron Jennings "lil aaron" Puckett, Rocco "Rocco Did It Again!" Valdes
2024	Kim Petras	Slut Pop Miami	"Fuckin' This Fuckin' That"	Aaron Joseph Aguilar, Ryan John "OG" Ogren, Kim Petras, Aaron Jennings "lil aaron" Puckett
2024	Kim Petras	Slut Pop Miami	"Banana Boat"	Aaron Joseph Aguilar, Ryan John "OG" Ogren, Kim Petras, Rocco "Rocco Did It Again!" Valdes
2024	Kim Petras	Slut Pop Miami	"Get Fucked"	Aaron Joseph Aguilar, Ryan John "OG" Ogren, Kim Petras, Rocco "Rocco Did It Again!" Valdes
2024	Kim Petras	Slut Pop Miami	"Rim Job"	Aaron Joseph Aguilar, Ryan John "OG" Ogren, Kim Petras, Rocco "Rocco Did It Again!" Valdes
2024	Kim Petras	Slut Pop Miami	"Cockblocker"	Aaron Joseph Aguilar, Ryan John "OG" Ogren, Kim Petras, Rocco "Rocco Did It Again!" Valdes
2024	Kim Petras	Slut Pop Miami	"Butt Slutt"	Aaron Joseph Aguilar, Ryan John "OG" Ogren, Kim Petras, Rocco "Rocco Did It Again!" Valdes
2024	Kim Petras	Slut Pop Miami	"Head Head Honcho"	Aaron Joseph Aguilar, Ryan John "OG" Ogren, Kim Petras, Rocco "Rocco Did It Again!" Valdes
2024	Kim Petras	Slut Pop Miami	"Cubana"	Aaron Joseph Aguilar, Ryan John "OG" Ogren, Kim Petras, Aaron Jennings "lil aaron" Puckett
2024	Kim Petras	Slut Pop Miami	"Whale Cock"	Ryan John "OG" Ogren, Kim Petras, Rocco "Rocco Did It Again!" Valdes
2024	Kim Petras	Slut Pop Miami	"Can we fuck?"	Aaron Joseph Aguilar, Ryan John "OG" Ogren, Kim Petras, Rocco "Rocco Did It Again!" Valdes
2024	Kim Petras	Non-album single	"Ein Tausend Teile"	Max Paul Albert "Fat Max Gsus" Grahn, Anne Kristine Linnet, Kim Petras, Karl Martin "Max Martin" Sandberg
2024	LU KALA	No Tears On This Ride	"Who's Gonna"	Aaron Joseph Aguilar, Lusamba Vanessa "LU KALA" Kalala, Vaughn Richard "U-Tern" Oliver, Rocco "Rocco Did It Again!" Valdes
2024	Katy Perry	143	"Woman's World"	Aaron Joseph Aguilar, Chloe Christina Angelides, Katheryn Elizabeth "Katy Perry" Hudson, Vaughn Richard "U-Tern" Oliver, Rocco "Rocco Did It Again!" Valdes
2024	Katy Perry	143	"Lifetimes"	Katheryn Elizabeth "Katy Perry" Hudson, Sarah Theresa Hudson, Gamal Kosh "LunchMoney" Lewis, Ryan John "OG" Ogren, Vaughn Richard "U-Tern" Oliver, Theron Makiel "Theron Theron" Thomas, Rocco "Rocco Did It Again!" Valdes
2024	Katy Perry	143	"Crush"	Keegan Christopher "KBeaZy" Bach, Scott Harris Friedman, Katheryn Elizabeth "Katy Perry" Hudson, Sarah Theresa Hudson, Dallas James "DallasK" Koehlke, Ryan John "OG" Ogren, Emily Warren Schwartz, Theron Makiel "Theron Theron" Thomas, Rocco "Rocco Did It Again!" Valdes
2024	Katy Perry	143	"All the Love"	Aaron Joseph Aguilar, Ferras Mahmoud Alqaisi, Keegan Christopher "KBeaZy" Bach, Katheryn Elizabeth "Katy Perry" Hudson, Ryan John "OG" Ogren, Vaughn Richard "U-Tern" Oliver
2024	Katy Perry	143	"Nirvana"	Aaron Joseph Aguilar, Keegan Christopher "KBeaZy" Bach, Scott Harris Friedman, Katheryn Elizabeth "Katy Perry" Hudson, Sarah Theresa Hudson, Dallas James "DallasK" Koehlke, Ryan John "OG" Ogren, Vaughn Richard "U-Tern" Oliver, Emily Warren Schwartz, Theron Makiel "Theron Theron" Thomas, Rocco "Rocco Did It Again!" Valdes
2024	Katy Perry	143	"Truth"	Katheryn Elizabeth "Katy Perry" Hudson, Sarah Theresa Hudson, Gamal Kosh "LunchMoney" Lewis, Ryan John "OG" Ogren, Vaughn Richard "U-Tern" Oliver
2024	Katy Perry	143	"Has a Heart"	Katheryn Elizabeth "Katy Perry" Hudson, Gamal Kosh "LunchMoney" Lewis, Ryan John "OG" Ogren, Vaughn Richard "U-Tern" Oliver, Rocco "Rocco Did It Again!" Valdes
2024	Katy Perry	143	"No Tears for New Year's"	Ferras Mahmoud Alqaisi, Katheryn Elizabeth "Katy Perry" Hudson, Ryan John "OG" Ogren, Theron Makiel "Theron Theron" Thomas, Rocco "Rocco Did It Again!" Valdes
2024	Katy Perry	143	"I Woke Up"	Katheryn Elizabeth "Katy Perry" Hudson, Sarah Theresa Hudson, Gamal Kosh "LunchMoney" Lewis, Ryan John "OG" Ogren, Vaughn Richard "U-Tern" Oliver, Theron Makiel "Theron Theron" Thomas, Rocco "Rocco Did It Again!" Valdes
2024	Katy Perry	143	"OK"	Aaron Joseph Aguilar, Ferras Mahmoud Alqaisi, Chloe Christina Angelides, Katheryn Elizabeth "Katy Perry" Hudson, Lusamba Vanessa "LU KALA" Kalala, Ryan John "OG" Ogren, Vaughn Richard "U-Tern" Oliver
2024	Katy Perry & JID	143	"Artificial"	Aaron Joseph Aguilar, Chloe Christina Angelides, Keegan Christopher "KBeaZy" Bach, Sam "Slush Puppy" Catalano, Katheryn Elizabeth "Katy Perry" Hudson, Sarah Theresa Hudson, Destin Choice "JID" Route
2024	Katy Perry & Doechii	143	"I'm His, He's Mine"	Ferras Mahmoud Alqaisi, Neal Brian Conway, Jaylah Ji'mya "Doechii" Hickmon, Katheryn Elizabeth "Katy Perry" Hudson, Gamal Kosh "LunchMoney" Lewis, Ryan John "OG" Ogren, Theron Makiel "Theron Theron" Thomas, Rocco "Rocco Did It Again!" Valdes, Crystal Waters
2024	Katy Perry & 21 Savage	143	"Gimme Gimme"	Shéyaa Bin "21 Savage" Abraham-Joseph, Ferras Mahmoud Alqaisi, Katheryn Elizabeth "Katy Perry" Hudson, Gamal Kosh "LunchMoney" Lewis, Ryan John "OG" Ogren, Theron Makiel "Theron Theron" Thomas, Rocco "Rocco Did It Again!" Valdes
2024	Katy Perry & Kim Petras	143	"Gorgeous"	Aaron Joseph Aguilar, Chloe Christina Angelides, Katheryn Elizabeth "Katy Perry" Hudson, Lauren Michelle "Malibu Babie" Miller, Vaughn Richard "U-Tern" Oliver, Kim Petras, Karl Martin "Max Martin" Sandberg, Rocco "Rocco Did It Again!" Valdes, Devin J. "Houseparty" Wilkes
2024	BLP KOSHER	Scarecrow	"Cobwebs"	Benjamin Shimon "BLP KOSHER" Landy-Pavlon, Rocco "Rocco Did It Again!" Valdes
2024	LU KALA	No Tears On This Ride	"Criminal"	Lusamba Vanessa "LU KALA" Kalala, James Matthew "Boy Matthews" Norton, Vaughn Richard "U-Tern" Oliver, Blake Mitchell Straus
2024	Lourdiz	TBA	"Cute"	Alyssa Lourdiz Cantu, Ryan John "OG" Ogren, Theron Makiel "Theron Theron" Thomas
2025	Big Boss Vette	TBA	"I Look Like"	Diamond Alexxis "Big Boss Vette" Smith, Theron Makiel "Theron Theron" Thomas
2025	LU KALA & SheLailai	No Tears On This Ride	"Work"	Lailah Syanne "SheLailai" Francis, Lusamba Vanessa "LU KALA" Kalala, Theron Makiel "Theron Theron" Thomas, Rocco "Rocco Did It Again!" Valdes
2025	Lourdiz	TBA	"if i'm being honest"	Alyssa Lourdiz Cantu, Brandon "B HAM" Hamlin, Kareen Lomax, Ryan John "OG" Ogren, Theron Makiel "Theron Theron" Thomas
2025	Lourdiz	TBA	"if i can't feel you"	Alyssa Lourdiz Cantu
2025	Lourdiz	TBA	"To Luv Ya"	Alyssa Lourdiz Cantu, Theron Makiel "Theron Theron" Thomas
2025	SheLailai	TBA	"Don't Need Him"	Lailah Syanne "SheLailai" Francis
2025	Seyi Vibez & Trippie Redd	FUJI MOTO	"UP"	Balogun Afolabi "Seyi Vibez" Oluwaloseyi & Michael Lamar "Trippie Redd" White II
2025	Big Boss Vette	TBA	"Talk Yo Shit"	Gamal Kosh "LunchMoney" Lewis, Diamond Alexxis "Big Boss Vette" Smith, Theron Makiel "Theron Theron" Thomas
2025	SheLailai	Little Miss Crazy B!tch	"Don't Need Him"	Lailah Syanne "SheLailai" Francis
2025	SheLailai	Little Miss Crazy B!tch	"No Touchy"	Lailah Syanne "SheLailai" Francis
2026	SheLailai	Little Miss Crazy B!tch	"London's Burning"	Lailah Syanne "SheLailai" Francis
2026	Blackpink	Deadline	"Me and My"	Anjelica "Jelli" Dorman, Vaughn Richard "U-Tern" Oliver, Theron Makiel "Theron Theron" Thomas, Eric Tobias Wincorn, Rocco "Rocco Did It Again!" Valdes
2026	Blackpink	Deadline	"Champion"	Kim "Ejae" Eun-jae & Theron Makiel "Theron Theron" Thomas
2026	Taeyang, Tarzzan & Woochan	Quintessence	"Would You"	Lee "Tarzzan" Chae-won, Ashley Glenn Gorley, Park "Teddy Park" Hong-jun, Ryan John "OG" Ogren, Joe "Vince" Rhee, Theron Makiel "Theron Theron" Thomas, Rocco "Rocco Did It Again!" Valdes, Jo Woo-chan, Dong "Taeyang" Young-bae
2026	Katy Perry & Chief Keef	Non-album single	"Legendary Lovers (Save Me)"	Keith Farrelle "Chief Keef" Cozart, Katheryn Elizabeth "Katy Perry" Hudson, Bonnie Leigh McKee, Karl Martin "Max Martin" Sandberg, Henry Russell "Cirkut" Walter
2026	Meovv	Bite Now	"Hit 'Em"	Theron Makiel "Theron Theron" Thomas, Aaron Jennings "lil aaron" Puckett, Lailah Syanne "SheLailai" Francis
2026	Meovv	Bite Now	"In My Hands"	Vaugn Richard "U-Tern" Oliver, Lauren Michelle "Malibu Babie" Miller, Anthony "Anthony Watts" Pavel, Megan "bülow" Bülow, Narin, Lee Ga-won, Jeong "24" Hun-seol, Park "Teddy Park" Hong-jun, Joong "IDO" Gyu-kwak, Yu "IDO" Han-lee, Hee "IDO" Dong-nam
2026	Senseless Optimism	PAINFULLY POP	"THREE YEARS DOWN"	Ngangneh Brittany-Marie "Senseless Optimism" Tsewole
2026	Senseless Optimism	PAINFULLY POP	"NUMB"	Caroline Coral "carobae" Baker, Christian David "Delmar" Carcamo, Ngangneh Brittany-Marie "Senseless Optimism" Tsewole
2026	Millaine	Non-album single	"Whining"	Ethan Philip "Baby E" Lowery, Melleine "Millaine" Sikuli, Henry Russell "Cirkut" Walter
2026	Lourdiz	Non-album single	"BOOM"	Alyssa Lourdiz Cantu, Rocco "Rocco Did It Again!" Valdes
2026	Lourdiz	Non-album single	"Kick a Bitch"	Alyssa Lourdiz Cantu, Rocco "Rocco Did It Again!" Valdes
2026	Lourdiz	Non-album single	"Rockstar"	Alyssa Lourdiz Cantu
2026	Yuki Chiba	EN	"Shinukaikiruka"	Yuki Chiba
2026	R. City & Ayra Starr	Non-album single	"Pray"	Keegan Christopher "KBeaZy" Bach, Megan "bülow" Bülow, Kim "Ejae" Eun-jae, Theron Makiel "Theron Theron" Thomas, Timothy Jamahli "A.I." Thomas
2026	SheLailai & Eem Triplin	Non-album single	"Keeper"	Lailah Syanne "SheLailai" Francis, Naeem Muhammad "Eem" Triplin

== Produced and co-produced songs ==
indicates a song labelled as additional producer.

indicates a song labelled as co-producer.

Year	Artist	Album	Song	Produced with
1996	Evan Faber, Michael Sinterniklaas, Michelle Medlin, Ona Tzar, Emily Kapnek	The Pink Panther: Passport to Peril	"Chilly Wa Wa Finale (Trapped in a Bubble)"	Jared Faber
1997	Kasz & Beal	Mortal Kombat Annihilation OST	"Theme from Mortal Kombat"	Lawrence Kasanoff, Steve Gottlieb
1997	Kasz	Non-album single	"Wave Gravy"	No additional producers
1997	Kasz	Non-album single	"Wet Lapse"	No additional producers
1997	Sir Menelik	Non-album single	"Macroscope"	No additional producers
1998	The Getaway People	The Getaway People	"She Gave Me Love"	The Getaway People
1999	Wide	Unknownwerks	"Lift Ticket"	Liquid Todd
1999	Wide	Torchbearers	"Top Rockin'"	Liquid Todd
1999	Wide	Action	"Rocktronix"	Liquid Todd
1999	Wide	Deep Porn	"Zap"	Liquid Todd
1999	The Getaway People	Chocolate (EP)	"Chocolate (The Wide Remix)"	Liquid Todd
1999	Kodō	Sai-Sō	"Wax On (Kasz & David Beal Mix)"	David Beal
2000	Mocean Worker	Aural & Hearty	"Hey Baby"	No additional producers
2001	Jive Jones	Me, Myself + I	"Dear Dad"	Jive Jones
2002	B. Rich	80 Dimes	"Nightmares"	James Chambers
2002	Ursula 1000	Kinda Kinky	"Kinda Kinky"	Ursula 1000
2002	Ursula 1000	Kinda Kinky	"Samba 1000"	Ursula 1000
2002	Ursula 1000	Kinda Kinky	"The Girl from N.O.W.H.E.R.E."	Ursula 1000
2002	Liquid Todd & Dr. Luke	The Hot Chick OST	"Stick 'Em"	Liquid Todd
2002	Speech	Down South Produckshuns	"The New Sound (Hip-Hop Hillbilly)"	Speech
2002	Speech	Down South Produckshuns	"Ain't Nothing New But You"	Speech
2003	SK	Non-album single	"Single Black Female"	Dave Katz
2003	Jeannie Ortega	Love Don't Cost a Thing OST	"Got What It Takes"	Dave Katz
2004	Arrested Development	Among the Trees	"Esmerelda"	No additional producers
2004	Jeannie Ortega	That's so Raven OST	"Future Is Clear"	Dave Katz
2004	Kelly Clarkson	Breakaway	"Since U Been Gone"	Max Martin
2004	Kelly Clarkson	Breakaway	"Behind These Hazel Eyes"	Max Martin
2005	Ebony Eyez	7 Day Cycle	"Real Life"	Da Beatstaz
2005	Marion Raven	Here I Am	"Break You"	Max Martin
2005	Backstreet Boys	Never Gone	"Just Want You to Know"	Max Martin
2005	Backstreet Boys	Never Gone	"Climbing the Walls"	Max Martin
2005	The Veronicas	The Secret Life Of...	"4ever"	Max Martin
2005	The Veronicas	The Secret Life Of...	"Everything I'm Not"	Max Martin, Rami Yacoub
2005	Bo Bice	The Real Thing	"Make Me Better"	Max Martin
2005	Bo Bice	The Real Thing	"Lie... It's Alright"	Max Martin
2006	Ursula 1000	Here Comes Tomorrow	"Hello! Let's Go to a Disco"	Ursula 1000
2006	Ursula 1000	Here Comes Tomorrow	"Arrastao"	Ursula 1000
2006	Ursula 1000	Here Comes Tomorrow	"Elektrik Boogie"	Ursula 1000
2006	Ashley Angel	Soundtrack to Your Life	"Let U Go"	Max Martin
2006	Ashley Angel	Soundtrack to Your Life	"I'm Better"	Max Martin
2006	Pink	I'm Not Dead	"Who Knew"	Max Martin
2006	Pink	I'm Not Dead	"Cuz I Can"	Max Martin
2006	Pink	I'm Not Dead	"U + Ur Hand"	Max Martin
2006	Jeannie Ortega	No Place Like BKLYN	"Can U?"	Dave Katz, Da Beatstaz
2006	Paris Hilton	Paris	"Nothing in This World"	No additional producers
2006	Kelis	Kelis Was Here	"I Don't Think So"	Max Martin
2006	Jibbs	Jibbs Featuring Jibbs	"Firr Az That Thang"	Da Beatstaz
2006	Lady Sovereign	Public Warning	"Love Me or Hate Me"	No additional producers
2006	Lady Sovereign	Public Warning	"Those Were the Days"	No additional producers
2007	Avril Lavigne	The Best Damn Thing	"Girlfriend"	Matt Beckley, Steven Wolf
2007	Avril Lavigne	The Best Damn Thing	"I Can Do Better"	Matt Beckley, Steven Wolf
2007	Avril Lavigne	The Best Damn Thing	"Runaway"	Matt Beckley, Steven Wolf
2007	Avril Lavigne	The Best Damn Thing	"Hot"	Matt Beckley, Steven Wolf
2007	Avril Lavigne	The Best Damn Thing	"I Don't Have to Try"	Matt Beckley, Steven Wolf
2007	Avril Lavigne	The Best Damn Thing	"Keep Holding On"	Matt Beckley
2007	Avril Lavigne	The Best Damn Thing	"Alone"	Matt Beckley, Steven Wolf
2007	Avril Lavigne	The Best Damn Thing	"I Will Be"	Matt Beckley, Steven Wolf
2007	Megan McCauley	Better Than Blood	"Tap That"	Max Martin
2007	Lil Mama	VYP	"G-Slide (Tour Bus)"	Da Beatstaz, Matt Beckley, Tatiana Gottwald
2007	Lil Mama	VYP	"Broken Pieces"	James Chambers, Benny Blanco, Tatiana Gottwald
2007	Sugababes	Change	"About You Now"	Rob Smith, Steven Wolf
2007	Sugababes	Change	"Surprise"	Rob Smith, Steven Wolf
2007	Sugababes	Change	"Open the Door"	Rob Smith, Steven Wolf
2007	Santana	Ultimate Santana	"This Boy's Fire feat. Jennifer Lopez & Baby Bash"	Steve Morales, Raymond Diaz, Sean Garrett, Cory Rooney
2007	Skye Sweetnam	Sound Soldier	"Girl Like Me"	Max Martin
2007	Leona Lewis	Spirit	"I Will Be"	No additional producers
2008	Katy Perry	One of the Boys	"I Kissed a Girl"	Benny Blanco
2008	Katy Perry	One of the Boys	"Hot n Cold"	Benny Blanco
2008	Vanessa Hudgens	Identified	"Identified"	Max Martin
2008	Vanessa Hudgens	Identified	"First Bad Habit"	No additional producers
2008	Vanessa Hudgens	Identified	"Don't Ask Why"	No additional producers
2008	Vanessa Hudgens	Identified	"Amazed"	Benny Blanco
2008	Lesley Roy	Unbeautiful	"Slow Goodbye"	Max Martin
2008	Britney Spears	Circus	"Circus"	Benny Blanco
2008	Britney Spears	Circus	"Shattered Glass"	Benny Blanco, Claude Kelly
2008	Britney Spears	Circus	"Lace and Leather"	Benny Blanco
2008	Will Ferrell & John C. Reilly	Step Brothers OST	"Boats 'N Hoes"	Marty Brumbach, Hal Willner
2009	Kelly Clarkson	All I Ever Wanted	"My Life Would Suck Without You"	Max Martin
2009	Flo Rida	R.O.O.T.S.	"Right Round feat. Kesha"	Kool Kojak
2009	Flo Rida	R.O.O.T.S.	"Touch Me feat. Kesha"	Benny Blanco
2009	Lady Sovereign	Jigsaw	"So Human"	Medasyn, Benny Blanco
2009	Lady Sovereign	Jigsaw	"Pennies"	Medasyn, Benny Blanco
2009	Mickey Avalon	Non-album single	"Fuckin Em All"	Benny Blanco
2009	Mickey Avalon	Non-album single	"Stroke Me"	Cisco Adler, Benny Blanco
2009	Ciara	Fantasy Ride	"Tell Me What Your Name Is"	Benny Blanco
2009	Jordin Sparks	Battlefield	"Watch You Go"	Benny Blanco, Ammo
2009	Miley Cyrus	The Time of Our Lives EP	"Party in the U.S.A."	No additional producers
2009	Miley Cyrus	The Time of Our Lives EP	"The Time of Our Lives"	Claude Kelly, Emily Wright
2009	Pitbull	Pitbull Starring in Rebelution	"Girls"	Ammo
2009	Adam Lambert	For Your Entertainment	"For Your Entertainment"	No additional producers
2009	Weezer	Raditude	"I'm Your Daddy"	Rivers Cuomo
2009	Weezer	Raditude	"Get Me Some"	Rivers Cuomo
2010	Kesha	Animal	"Tik Tok"	Benny Blanco
2010	Kesha	Animal	"Your Love is My Drug"	Benny Blanco, Ammo
2010	Kesha	Animal	"Take It Off"	No additional producers
2010	Kesha	Animal	"Kiss n Tell"	Max Martin
2010	Kesha	Animal	"Hungover"	Max Martin, Ammo
2010	Kesha	Animal	"Blind"	Benny Blanco, Ammo
2010	Kesha	Animal	"Dancing with Tears in My Eyes"	Benny Blanco
2010	Miranda Cosgrove	Sparks Fly	"Kissin' U"	Ammo
2010	Kevin Rudolf	To the Sky	"You Make the Rain Fall" feat. Flo Rida	Kevin Rudolf
2010	Kevin Rudolf	To the Sky	"Whatchu Waiting For" feat. Three 6 Mafia	Kevin Rudolf, Jeff Halavacs
2010	Kevin Rudolf	To the Sky	"Must Be Dreamin'" feat. Rivers Cuomo of Weezer	Kevin Rudolf, Rivers Cuomo
2010	Kevin Rudolf	To the Sky	"Late Night Automatic" feat. Three 6 Mafia	Kevin Rudolf, Jeff Halavacs
2010	B.o.B	Adventures of Bobby Ray	"Magic feat. Rivers Cuomo"	No additional producers
2010	3OH!3	Streets of Gold	"My First Kiss feat. Kesha"	3OH!3, Benny Blanco
2010	3OH!3	Streets of Gold	"Streets of Gold"	3OH!3, Benny Blanco
2010	Nelly, T-Pain & Akon	5.0	"Move That Body feat. Akon & T-Pain"	Bangladesh
2010	Taio Cruz	Rokstarr	"Dynamite"	Benny Blanco
2010	Taio Cruz	Rokstarr	"Dirty Picture feat. Kesha"	Taio Cruz
2010	B.o.B	No Genre	Batman Flow	
2010	Lil Jon	Crunk Rock	"Hey feat. 3OH!3"	Benny Blanco, Kool Kojak
2010	Kelly Rowland	Here I Am	"Rose Colored Glasses"	Emily Wright
2010	Victoria Justice	Victorious OST	"Make It Shine"	Michael Corcoran
2010	Victoria Justice	Victorious OST	"Leave It All to Shine"	Michael Corcoran
2010	Katy Perry	Teenage Dream	"California Gurls feat. Snoop Dogg"	Benny Blanco, Max Martin
2010	Katy Perry	Teenage Dream	"Teenage Dream"	Max Martin, Benny Blanco
2010	Katy Perry	Teenage Dream	"Last Friday Night (T.G.I.F.)"	Max Martin
2010	Katy Perry	Teenage Dream	"The One That Got Away"	Max Martin
2010	Katy Perry	Teenage Dream	"E.T. feat. Kanye West"	Max Martin, Ammo
2010	Kesha	Cannibal EP	"We R Who We R"	Benny Blanco, Ammo
2010	Kesha	Cannibal EP	"Sleazy"	Benny Blanco, Bangladesh
2010	Kesha	Cannibal EP	"Blow"	Max Martin, Benny Blanco, Kool Kojak
2010	Kesha	Cannibal EP	"Crazy Beautiful Life"	No additional producers
2010	Kesha	Cannibal EP	"Grow a Pear"	Max Martin, Benny Blanco
2010	Flo Rida	Only One Flo (Part 1)	"Who Dat Girl feat. Akon"	Benny Blanco
2010	T.I.	No Mercy	"That's All She Wrote" feat. Eminem	Max Martin
2011	Jessie J	Who You Are	"Price Tag feat. B.o.B"	No additional producers
2011	Jessie J	Who You Are	"Abracadabra"	No additional producers
2011	Jessie J	Who You Are	"Domino"	Jessica Cornish, Claude Kelly
2011	Britney Spears	Femme Fatale	"Hold It Against Me"	Max Martin, Billboard
2011	Britney Spears	Femme Fatale	"Till the World Ends"	Max Martin, Billboard, Emily Wright
2011	Britney Spears	Femme Fatale	"Inside Out"	Max Martin, Billboard, Emily Wright
2011	Britney Spears	Femme Fatale	"Seal It with a Kiss"	Max Martin, Cirkut, Emily Wright
2011	Britney Spears	Femme Fatale	"Gasoline"	Benny Blanco, Emily Wright
2011	Pitbull	Planet Pit	"Come n Go feat. Enrique Iglesias"	Benny Blanco
2011	Sabi	Non-album single	"Wild Heart"	Cirkut
2011	Sabi	Non-album single	"Where They Do That At feat. Wale"	Cirkut
2011	Flo Rida	Wild Ones	"Good Feeling"	Cirkut, Emily Wright
2011	Rihanna	Talk That Talk	"You da One"	Cirkut, Kuk Harrell
2011	Rihanna	Talk That Talk	"Where Have You Been"	Cirkut, Calvin Harris, Kuk Harrell
2011	Rihanna	Talk That Talk	"Fool in Love"	Cirkut, Ester Dean, Kuk Harrell
2011	T-Pain	Revolver	"Turn All the Lights On feat. Ne-Yo"	Cirkut
2011	Taio Cruz	TY.O	"Hangover feat. Flo Rida"	Cirkut
2011	Taio Cruz	TY.O	"Make It Last Forever"	Cirkut
2011	Taio Cruz	TY.O	"Tattoo"	Cirkut
2012	Miranda Cosgrove	iCarly OST	"All Kinds of Wrong"	Emily Wright
2012	Miranda Cosgrove	iCarly OST	"Million Dollars"	Emily Wright, Oligee
2012	Katy Perry	Teenage Dream: The Complete Confection	"Part of Me"	Max Martin, Cirkut
2012	Katy Perry	Teenage Dream: The Complete Confection	"Wide Awake"	Cirkut
2012	Nicki Minaj	Pink Friday: Roman Reloaded	"Young Forever"	Cirkut
2012	Nicki Minaj	Pink Friday: Roman Reloaded	"Va Va Voom"	Cirkut, Kool Kojak
2012	Nicki Minaj	Pink Friday: Roman Reloaded	"Masquerade"	Cirkut, Benny Blanco
2012	Marina	Electra Heart	"Primadonna"	Cirkut
2012	Marina	Electra Heart	"Lies"	Cirkut, Diplo
2012	Marina	Electra Heart	"How to Be a Heartbreaker"	Cirkut, Benny Blanco
2012	B.o.B	Strange Clouds	"Strange Clouds feat. Lil Wayne"	Cirkut
2012	B.o.B	Strange Clouds	"Both of Us feat. Taylor Swift"	Cirkut
2012	B.o.B	Strange Clouds	"Arena feat. Chris Brown & T.I."	Cirkut
2012	B.o.B	Strange Clouds	"Out of My Mind feat. Nicki Minaj"	Billboard
2012	Adam Lambert	Trespassing	"Better Than I Know Myself"	Cirkut, Ammo
2012	Adam Lambert	Trespassing	"Never Close Our Eyes"	Cirkut, The Smeezingtons
2012	Cody Simpson	Paradise	"Wish U Were Here feat. Becky G"	No additional producers
2012	Karmin	Hello	"Brokenhearted"	Cirkut, Emily Wright
2012	Cher Lloyd	Sticks and Stones	"Oath feat. Becky G"	Cirkut, Robopop, Chris O'Ryan
2012	Becky G	Non-album single	"Problem feat. Will.i.am"	Cirkut
2012	One Direction	Take Me Home	"Rock Me"	Cirkut, Kool Kojak, Emily Wright
2012	Kesha	Warrior	"Die Young"	Cirkut, Benny Blanco
2012	Kesha	Warrior	"C'Mon"	Cirkut, Benny Blanco, Emily Wright
2012	Kesha	Warrior	"Warrior"	Cirkut, Emily Wright
2012	Kesha	Warrior	"Thinking of You"	Cirkut, Benny Blanco, Emily Wright
2012	Kesha	Warrior	"Crazy Kids feat. Will.i.am"	Cirkut, Benny Blanco
2012	Kesha	Warrior	"Wherever You Are"	Cirkut
2012	Kesha	Warrior	"Dirty Love feat. Iggy Pop"	Cirkut, Matt Squire
2012	Kesha	Warrior	"Wonderland"	Cirkut, Kool Kojak, Emily Wright
2012	Kesha	Warrior	"Only Wanna Dance with You"	Cirkut, Max Martin, Steven Wolf
2012	Kesha	Warrior	"Supernatural"	Cirkut
2012	Kesha	Warrior	"Last Goodbye"	Cirkut, Benny Blanco, Emily Wright
2012	Kesha	Warrior	"Gold Trans Am"	Cirkut, Kool Kojak, Emily Wright
2013	Will.i.am	willpower	"Fall Down feat. Miley Cyrus"	Cirkut, Benny Blanco
2013	Will.i.am	willpower	"Reach for the Stars"	Will.i.am
2013	The Wanted	Word of Mouth	"Walks Like Rihanna"	Cirkut, Electric
2013	Britney Spears	The Smurfs 2 OST	"Ooh La La"	Cirkut, Ammo, Emily Wright
2013	G.R.L.	The Smurfs 2 OST	"Vacation"	Max Martin, Cirkut
2013	Juicy J	Stay Trippy	"Bounce It feat. Wale & Trey Songz"	Cirkut, Baby E
2013	Robin Thicke	Blurred Lines	"Give It 2 U feat. Kendrick Lamar"	Cirkut
2013	Becky G	Play It Again EP	"Play It Again"	Cirkut
2013	Becky G	Play It Again EP	"Can't Get Enough feat. Pitbull"	Cirkut
2013	Becky G	Play It Again EP	"Built for This"	Cirkut
2013	Becky G	Play It Again EP	"Zoomin Zoomin"	Cirkut
2013	Becky G	Play It Again EP	"Lovin What You Do"	Cirkut
2013	3Ball MTY	Globall	"Quiero Bailar (All Through the Night) (feat. Becky G)"	Antonio Hernandez Luna, Urales Vargas
2013	Miley Cyrus	Bangerz	"Wrecking Ball"	Cirkut
2013	Jessie J	Alive	"Harder We Fall"	Cirkut
2013	Jessie J	Alive	"Excuse My Rude feat. Becky G"	Cirkut
2013	Jessie J	Alive	"Gold"	Cirkut
2013	Pitbull	Global Warming: Meltdown	"Timber feat. Kesha"	Cirkut, Sermstyle, Nick Seeley
2013	Katy Perry	Prism	"Roar"	Max Martin, Cirkut
2013	Katy Perry	Prism	"Unconditionally"	Max Martin, Cirkut
2013	Katy Perry	Prism	"Legendary Lovers"	Max Martin, Cirkut
2013	Katy Perry	Prism	"Birthday"	Max Martin, Cirkut
2013	Katy Perry	Prism	"Dark Horse feat. Juicy J "	Max Martin, Cirkut
2013	Katy Perry	Prism	"International Smile"	Max Martin, Cirkut
2013	Katy Perry	Prism	"Ghost"	Max Martin, Cirkut
2013	Britney Spears	Britney Jean	"Brightest Morning Star"	Cirkut, Chris Braide, Anthony Preston
2014	Shakira	Shakira	"Dare (La La La)"	Cirkut, Billboard, Shakira, J2
2014	Pitbull	One Love, One Rhythm	"We Are One (Ole Ola)"	Cirkut, Thomas Troelsen
2014	Becky G	Non-album single	"Shower"	Cirkut
2014	G.R.L.	G.R.L. EP	"Ugly Heart"	Cirkut
2014	G.R.L.	G.R.L. EP	"Show Me What You Got"	Max Martin, Cirkut
2014	G.R.L.	G.R.L. EP	"Rewind"	Max Martin, Cirkut
2014	Juicy J	Non-album single	"Low feat. Nicki Minaj, Lil Bibby & Young Thug"	Cirkut
2014	Wiz Khalifa	Blacc Hollywood	"Stayin Out All Night"	Cirkut, Nick Ruth
2014	Ne-Yo	Non-Fiction	"She Knows feat. Juicy J"	Cirkut, Jesse Wilson
2014	Yelle	Complètement fou	"Complètement fou"	Yelle, Cirkut
2014	Yelle	Complètement fou	"Coca sans bulles"	Yelle, Cirkut
2014	Yelle	Complètement fou	"Florence in Italie"	Yelle, Cirkut, Kool Kojak
2014	Yelle	Complètement fou	"Un jour viendra"	Yelle, Cirkut
2014	Elliphant	One More EP	"Never Been in Love"	Cirkut
2014	Elliphant	One More EP	"Purple Light feat. Doja Cat"	Al Shux
2014	Becky G	Non-album single	"Can't Stop Dancin'"	R. City, Cirkut
2014	R. City	Non-album single	"I'm That... feat. 2 Chainz"	Cirkut
2014	Pitbull	Globalization	"Wild Wild Love feat. G.R.L."	Max Martin, Cirkut, A.C.
2014	Pitbull	Globalization	"Time of Our Lives feat. Ne-Yo"	Cirkut, Lifted
2014	Pitbull	Globalization	"Sexy Beaches feat. Chloe Angelides"	Cirkut
2014	Pitbull	Globalization	"Drive You Crazy feat. Jason Derulo & Juicy J"	Cirkut
2014	Usher	Non-album single	"I Don't Mind feat. Juicy J"	R. City, Cirkut
2014	Nicki Minaj	The Pinkprint	"Pills n Potions"	Cirkut
2014	Nicki Minaj	The Pinkprint	"Only feat. Drake, Lil Wayne & Chris Brown"	Cirkut, JMIKE
2014	Nicki Minaj	The Pinkprint	"Get On Your Knees feat. Ariana Grande"	Cirkut
2014	Nicki Minaj	The Pinkprint	"Trini Dem Girls feat. LunchMoney Lewis"	Cirkut, A.C. JMIKE
2014	Nicki Minaj	The Pinkprint	"The Night is Still Young"	Cirkut
2015	Juicy J	Non-album single	"For Everybody feat. Wiz Khalifa & R. City"	Cirkut, JMIKE
2015	Fifth Harmony	Reflection	"This is How We Roll"	Cirkut, Tommy Parker
2015	Becky G	Non-album single	"Lovin' So Hard"	Cirkut, JMIKE
2015	Ciara	Jackie	"Lullaby"	Cirkut, Chris O'Ryan
2015	Ciara	Jackie	"Dance like We're Making Love"	Cirkut
2015	Ciara	Jackie	"Give Me Love"	Cirkut
2015	Ciara	Jackie	"Kiss & Tell"	Cirkut, Chris O'Ryan
2015	G.R.L.	Non-album single	"Lighthouse"	Rock City, Henry Walter
2015	Flo Rida	My House EP	"Once in a Lifetime"	Cirkut
2015	LunchMoney Lewis	Non-album single	"Whip It! feat. Chloe Angelides"	Cirkut, Space Primates
2015	Becky G	Non-album single	"Break a Sweat"	Cirkut
2015	R. City	What Dreams Are Made Of	"Locked Away feat. Adam Levine"	Cirkut
2015	R. City	What Dreams Are Made Of	"Make Up feat. Chloe Angelides"	Cirkut
2015	R. City	What Dreams Are Made Of	"Like This"	Cirkut
2015	R. City	What Dreams Are Made Of	"Checking for You"	Cirkut
2015	R. City	What Dreams Are Made Of	"Take You Down"	Cirkut
2015	R. City	What Dreams Are Made Of	"Broadway"	Cirkut, Salaam Remi
2015	R. City	What Dreams Are Made Of	"Over"	Cirkut
2015	R. City	What Dreams Are Made Of	"Again"	Cirkut
2015	R. City	What Dreams Are Made Of	"Live By the Gun feat. Akon"	Cirkut, Mel & Sus
2015	R. City	What Dreams Are Made Of	"Slave to the Dollar"	Cirkut, Cameron Wallace
2015	R. City	What Dreams Are Made Of	"Save My Soul"	Cirkut
2015	R. City	What Dreams Are Made Of	"Crazy Love feat. Tarrus Riley"	Cirkut, KOZ, Chin-Chee
2015	R. City	What Dreams Are Made Of	"Don't You Worry"	Cirkut
2015	R. City	What Dreams Are Made Of	"Our Story"	Cirkut, Jevon Hill
2015	Becky G	Non-album single	"You Love It"	Cirkut
2015	LunchMoney Lewis	Non-album single	"Ain't Too Cool"	Ricky Reed
2015	R. Kelly	The Buffet	"Marching Band feat. Juicy J"	Cirkut, A.C., JMIKE, R. Kelly
2016	Elliphant	Living Life Golden	"Everybody feat. Azealia Banks"	Cirkut
2016	Elliphant	Living Life Golden	"Love Me Badder"	Cirkut, Thommy Tysper
2016	Pitbull	Non-album single	"Superstar feat. Becky G"	No additional Producers
2016	Jennifer Lopez	Non-album single	"Ain't Your Mama"	Cirkut
2016	DJ Fresh	Non-album single	"Bang Bang feat. R. City, Selah Sue & Craig David"	Daniel Stein, Thomas Pentz, Th. Thomas, Ti. Thomas, Henry Walter
2016	Pitbull	Climate Change	"Greenlight feat. Flo Rida & LunchMoney Lewis"	Cirkut
2016	Pusha T	The Land OST	"Paid feat. Jeremih"	Cirkut
2017	Baby E	Kill the Noise	"Need Me"	Cirkut
2017	Trey Songz	Tremaine the Album	"Animal"	Cirkut, JMIKE, Osta
2017	Trey Songz	Tremaine the Album	"Priceless"	Cirkut, JMIKE, Ryan Ogren
2017	Ne-Yo	Non-album single	"Another Love Song"	Cirkut
2017	Big Boi	Boomiverse	"All Night"	Cirkut, Griffin Oskar
2017	Kim Petras	Non-album single	"I Don't Want It at All"	Cirkut, Joseph
2017	Kim Petras	Non-album single	"Hillside Boys"	Joseph
2017	Kim Petras	Non-album single	"Hills feat. Baby E"	Joseph, B HAM
2017	Fergie	Double Dutchess	"A Little Work"	Cirkut, Fergie, Venus Brown
2017	Kyle	Non-album single	"Off of It feat. Ty Dolla Sign"	Kyle, Cirkut
2017	Kim Petras	Non-album single	"Slow It Down"	Cirkut, Joseph, Kool Kojak
2017	Kim Petras	Non-album single	"Faded feat. Lil Aaron"	Joseph
2018	Kim Petras	Non-album single	"Heart to Break"	Cirkut
2018	Sophia Black	Non-album single	"Blessed"	No additional producers
2018	Lil Aaron	Rockstar Famous EP	"4 Life"	Ryan Ogren
2018	Lil Aaron	Rockstar Famous EP	"Anymore feat. Kim Petras"	Ryan Ogren, B HAM
2018	Lil Aaron	Rockstar Famous EP	"Makin' Money feat. Kiiara"	Cirkut
2018	Lil Aaron	Rockstar Famous EP	"Quit feat. Travis Barker"	Ryan Ogren, DallasK, Y2K
2018	Lil Aaron	Rockstar Famous EP	"Stunt"	Robopop, B HAM
2018	Lil Aaron	Rockstar Famous EP	"Sometimes"	Ryan Ogren
2018	Kim Petras	Non-album single	"Can't Do Better"	Cirkut, Joseph
2018	Ne-Yo	Good Man	"Nights Like These feat. Romeo Santos"	Cirkut, Billboard
2018	Ne-Yo	Good Man	"On Ur Mind feat. PartyNextDoor"	Cirkut
2018	Ne-Yo	Good Man	"Ocean Sure"	Cirkut
2018	Sophie Rose	Non-album single	"Famous"	Cirkut, Sam F
2018	Iggy Azalea	Non-album single	"Savior feat. Quavo"	Cirkut
2018	Azealia Banks	Fantasea II: The Second Wave	"Treasure Island"	Cirkut
2018	Kim Petras	Non-album single	"All the Time"	Cirkut, Joseph
2018	lil aaron & Goody Grace	WORST CHRISTMAS EVER	"ALL I NEED"	Travis Barker
2018	Ivy Adara	Intraduction	"Callgirl"	Jon Hume
2018	Ivy Adara	Intraduction	"Lies"	Cirkut
2018	Baby E	TBA	"Trapper of the Year"	Ryan Ogren, Ben Billions
2018	Baby E	TBA	"Trappin' 4 a Livin'"	Ben Billions
2019	Kim Petras	Non-album single	"If U Think About Me..."	Joseph
2019	Kim Petras	Non-album single	"Homework feat. Lil Aaron"	Joseph
2019	Kim Petras	Non-album single	"1, 2, 3 Dayz Up feat. Sophie"	Joseph, Sophie
2019	Tyga	Legendary	"Haute feat. J Balvin & Chris Brown"	B HAM
2019	Kim Petras	Clarity	"Clarity"	Joseph, B HAM
2019	Kim Petras	Clarity	"Icy"	Joseph, Vaughn Oliver
2019	Kim Petras	Clarity	"Got My Number"	Joseph, Jussifer
2019	Kim Petras	Clarity	"Sweet Spot"	Joseph, Vaughn Oliver
2019	Kim Petras	Clarity	"Personal Hell"	Joseph, Vaughn Oliver
2019	Kim Petras	Clarity	"Broken"	Joseph, B HAM, Ben Billions
2019	Kim Petras	Clarity	"All I Do Is Cry"	Joseph, Nic Nac
2019	Kim Petras	Clarity	"Do Me"	Joseph, Vaughn Oliver
2019	Kim Petras	Clarity	"Meet the Parents"	Joseph
2019	Kim Petras	Clarity	"Another One"	Joseph
2019	Kim Petras	Clarity	"Blow It All"	Ryan Ogren, Joseph
2019	Kim Petras	Clarity	"Shinin'"	Joseph
2019	Kim Petras	Turn Off the Light	"Purgatory"	Vaughn Oliver
2019	Kim Petras	Turn Off the Light	"There Will Be Blood"	Joseph, Vaughn Oliver
2019	Kim Petras	Turn Off the Light	"Bloody Valentine"	Vaughn Oliver
2019	Kim Petras	Turn Off the Light	"Wrong Turn"	Joseph, Vaughn Oliver
2019	Kim Petras	Turn Off the Light	"Demons"	Vaughn Oliver
2019	Kim Petras	Turn Off the Light	"Massacre"	Joseph
2019	Kim Petras	Turn Off the Light	"Knives"	Vaughn Oliver
2019	Kim Petras	Turn Off the Light	"Death By Sex"	Joseph, Vaughn Oliver, B HAM
2019	Kim Petras	Turn Off the Light	"Omen"	Vaughn Oliver
2019	Kim Petras	Turn Off the Light	"Close Your Eyes"	Joseph
2019	Kim Petras	Turn Off the Light	"Transylvania"	Vaughn Oliver
2019	Kim Petras	Turn Off the Light	"Turn Off the Light"	Josseph
2019	Kim Petras	Turn Off the Light	"Tell Me It's a Nightmare"	Joseph
2019	Kim Petras	Turn Off the Light	"I Don't Wanna Die..."	Vaughn Oliver
2019	Kim Petras	Turn Off the Light	"In the Next Life"	Joseph, Vaughn Oliver
2019	Kim Petras	Turn Off the Light	"Boo! Bitch!"	Vaughn Oliver
2019	Kim Petras	Turn Off the Light	"Everybody Dies"	Joseph
2019	Doja Cat	Hot Pink	"Rules"	Danielle Alvarez, Ben Billions, Salaam Remi
2019	Doja Cat	Hot Pink	"Say So"	No additional producers
2019	Doja Cat	Hot Pink	"Like That feat. Gucci Mane"	Mike Crook
2019	Doja Cat	Hot Pink	"Shine"	No additional producers
2019	Doja Cat	Hot Pink	"Juicy feat. Tyga"	Yeti Beats
2020	Kim Petras	Non-album single	"Reminds Me"	Joseph, Small, Sumser
2020	Kim Petras	Non-album single	"Malibu"	Joseph, Vaughn Oliver, Jon Castelli, KooolKojak
2020	Doja Cat	Non-album single	"Say So" Remix (featuring Nicki Minaj)	No additional producers
2020	Benny Mayne	Non-album single	"Hokey Pokey"	B HAM, Ryan Ogren
2020	Lil Wayne	Funeral	"Shimmy featuring Doja Cat"	B HAM, Ogren
2020	Saweetie	Pretty Bitch Music	"Tap In"	No additional producers
2020	Juice Wrld	Legends Never Die	"Wishing Well"	ChopSquad DJ
2020	DaBaby	Blame It On Baby	"Blind feat. Young Thug"	No additional producers
2020	BabyBoySlimee & Teejay3k	30.5	"Time"	SB Beats
2020	Lourdiz	Non-album single	Somersault	No additional producers
2020	The Kid Laroi	F*ck Love: Savage	"Fuck you, Goodbye feat. Machine Gun Kelly"	Ryan Og
2020	Lourdiz	Non-album single	"Za za"	Mad Max
2020	Juice WRLD	Non-album single	"Reminds Me of You feat. The Kid Laroi"	Thomas, Sumser, Small, Joseph
2021	Saweetie	Pretty Bitch Music	"Best Friend feat. Doja Cat"	Rocco Did It Again!
2021	Kimberose	Out	"Sober"	No additional producers
2021	Lourdiz	Non-album single	"Circles"	No additional producers
2021	Tay Money	Non-album single	"Asthma Pump feat. Flo Milli"	No additional producers
2021	Doja Cat	Planet Her	“Need to Know"	No additional producers
2021	Doja Cat	Planet Her	"You Right feat. The Weeknd"	No additional producers
2021	Doja Cat	Planet Her	"Kiss Me More feat. SZA"	Yeti Beats
2021	Doja Cat	Planet Her	"Tonight feat. Eve"	Reef
2021	Lourdiz	Non-album single	"Shoot Me Down"	Ryan OG, B HAM
2021	Kim Petras	Non-album single	"Future Starts Now"	Aaron Joseph, Vaughn Oliver
2021	Young Thug	Non-album single	"Tick Tock"	Rocco Did It Again!
2021	Latto	777	"Big Energy"	Vaughn Oliver
2021	Lourdiz	Non-album single	"Get Along feat. Shenseea"	Ryan OG, B HAM, Mike Crook
2021	NASHE	With Love	"Rain"	Cirkut
2021	Saweetie	Pretty Bitch Music	"Icy Chain"	Rocco Did It Again!, lil aaron
2021	Kim Petras	Feed the Beast	"Coconuts"	Aaron Joseph, Housefly, Rocco Did It Again!, Ryan OG, Vaughn Oliver
2021	Juice Wrld	Fighting Demons	"Not Enough"	KBeaZy, Jay Craig, PD
2022	A1 LaFlare	Non-album single	"Wootie Woot"	Rocco Did It Again!
2022	Coi Leray	Trendsetter	"Anxiety"	Lil Aaron, Rocco Did It Again!, Ryan OG
2022	Coi Leray	Trendsetter	"Blick Blick feat. Nicki Minaj"	Mike Crook, Ryan Ogren
2022	Kim Petras	Slut Pop	"Slut Pop"	No additional producers
2022	Kim Petras	Slut Pop	"Treat Me Like A Slut"	No additional producers
2022	Kim Petras	Slut Pop	"XXX"	No additional producers
2022	Kim Petras	Slut Pop	"Superpower Bitch"	No additional producers
2022	Kim Petras	Slut Pop	"Throat Goat"	No additional producers
2022	Kim Petras	Slut Pop	"They Wanna Fuck"	No additional producers
2022	Kim Petras	Slut Pop	"Your Wish Is My Command"	No additional producers
2022	Shenseea	Alpha	"R U That feat. 21 Savage"	No additional producers
2022	Tyga & Doja Cat	Non-album single	"Freaky Deaky feat. Tyga"	Mike Crook, Ryan Ogren B HAM
2022	Joy Oladokun	TBA	"Purple Haze"	Joy Oladokun
2022	Big Boss Vette	Non-album single	"Snatched"	Reace Beatz, DJ Beatz
2022	Flo Milli	You Still Here, Ho?	"Big Steppa"	No additional producers
2022	Big Boss Vette, Flo Milli & Saucy Santana	TBA	"Snatched (Remix)"	Da Beatstaz
2022	Nicki Minaj	Queen Radio: Volume 1	"Super Freaky Girl"	Aaron Joseph, Malibu Babie, Vaughn Oliver
2022	Baby E	TBA	"internet girl"	No additional producers
2022	Baby E & Kim Petras	TBA	"untrustable"	No additional producers
2022	Big Boss Vette & SleazyWorld Go	TBA	"How TF"	KBeaZy
2022	Jnr Choi	Non-album single	"Tick Tock"	No additional producers
2022	Big Boss Vette	Non-album single	"Pretty Girls Walk"	Rocco Dit It Again!
2022	A1 LaFlare	Non-album single	"Paying Off"	No additional producers
2022	LU KALA	Non-album single	"Pretty Girl Era"	No additional producers
2023	Latto & LU KALA	TBA	"Lottery"	Brandon Benjamin
2023	Big Boss Vette	Non-album single	"Pretty Girls Walk (Remix) feat. Coi Leray"	Rocco Did It Again!
2023	Saucy Santana	TBA	"1-800-Bad-Bxtch"	Rocco Did It Again!
2023	Big Boss Vette	Non-album single	"Problem"	Rocco Did It Again!
2023	Kim Petras & Nicki Minaj	Feed the Beast	"Alone"	Rocco Did It Again!
2023	Quinn XCII	The People's Champ	"Georgia Peach"	No additional producers
2023	Tyga	TBA	"Day One"	No additional producers
2023	Lil Durk & J. Cole	Almost Healed	"All My Life"	No additional producers
2023	Lil Durk & Morgan Wallen	Almost Healed	"Stand by Me"	No additional producers
2023	Lourdiz	Non-album single	"All My Bitches"	Ryan OG
2023	Big Boss Vette & Omah Lay	METRO BOOMIN PRESENTS SPIDER-MAN: ACROSS THE SPIDER-VERSE (SOUNDTRACK FROM AND INSPIRED BY THE MOTION PICTURE)	"I Can't Stop"	Peter Fenn, B HAM
2023	Kim Petras	Feed the Beast	"Hit It from the Back"	Aaron Joseph, Vaughn Oliver
2023	Kim Petras	Feed the Beast	"Sex Talk"	Aaron Joseph, Vaughn Oliver
2023	Kim Petras	Feed the Beast	"Revelations"	Aaron Joseph, Vaughn Oliver
2023	Kim Petras	Feed the Beast	"Thousand Pieces"	Fat Max Gsus
2023	Young Thug	Business Is Business	"Went Thru It"	No additional producers
2023	Saweetie	Pretty Bitch Music	"Birthday feat. YG & Tyga"	Ryan OG
2023	glaive	Sessions for glaive's debut album i care so much that i don't care at all	"dr. luke song"	glaive
2023	Big Boss Vette	RESILIENCE	"Another One"	No additional producers
2023	Big Boss Vette	RESILIENCE	"Get It"	Rocco Did It Again!
2023	Big Boss Vette	RESILIENCE	"Ghetto Love"	No additional producers
2023	Big Boss Vette	RESILIENCE	"Dollas"	Rocco Did It Again!
2023	Big Boss Vette	RESILIENCE	"Lick the Cat"	No additional producers
2023	Cordae	TBA	"Make Up Your Mind"	No additional producers
2023	Polo G	Hood Poet	"Barely Holdin' On"	Noah Goldstein, Southside
2023	Trinity	Non-album single	"Hot Girls"	Mike Crook, Ryan OG
2023	Kim Petras	Problématique	"Problématique"	Aaron Joseph, Vaughn Oliver
2023	Kim Petras	Problématique	"Je T'Adore"	Aaron Joseph, Vaughn Oliver
2023	Kim Petras & Paris Hilton	Problématique	"All She Wants"	Aaron Joseph, Vaughn Oliver
2023	Kim Petras	Problématique	"Born Again"	Aaron Joseph, Vaughn Oliver
2023	Kim Petras	Problématique	"Something About U"	Aaron Joseph, Vaughn Oliver
2023	Kim Petras	Problématique	"Treat Me like a Ho"	Aaron Joseph
2023	Kim Petras	Problématique	"Confession"	Aaron Joseph, Vaughn Oliver
2023	Kim Petras	Problématique	"Deeper"	Aaron Joseph, Vaughn Oliver
2023	Kim Petras	Problématique	"Dirty Things"	Aaron Joseph, Vaughn Oliver
2023	Kim Petras	Problématique	"Love Ya Leave Ya"	Aaron Joseph, Vaughn Oliver
2023	LU KALA	Non-album single	"Hotter Now"	Vaughn Oliver, Space Primates
2023	Snow Wife & Big Boss Vette	Queen Degenerate	"HIT IT"	David Pramik, Slush Puppy
2023	Snow Wife	Queen Degenerate	"ON FIRE"	No additional producers
2023	Snow Wife	Queen Degenerate	"I LOVE DRUGS"	Nico Fabito, Slush Puppy
2023	Lil Durk, J. Cole & Burna Boy	All My Life (Remixes)	"All My Life (Burna Boy Remix)"	No additional producers
2023	Lil Durk, J. Cole & Stray Kids	All My Life (Remixes)	"All My Life (Stray Kids Remix)"	No additional producers
2023	City Girls & Kim Petras	RAW	"Flashy"	KBeaZy
2023	Nicki Minaj & Lourdiz	Pink Friday 2	"Cowgirl"	No additional producers
2024	Kim Petras	Slut Pop Miami	"Slut Pop Reprise"	No additional producers
2024	Kim Petras	Slut Pop Miami	"Gag on It"	No additional producers
2024	Kim Petras	Slut Pop Miami	"Fuckin' This Fuckin' That"	No additional producers
2024	Kim Petras	Slut Pop Miami	"Banana Boat"	No additional producers
2024	Kim Petras	Slut Pop Miami	"Get Fucked"	No additional producers
2024	Kim Petras	Slut Pop Miami	"Rim Job"	No additional producers
2024	Kim Petras	Slut Pop Miami	"Cockblocker"	No additional producers
2024	Kim Petras	Slut Pop Miami	"Butt Slutt"	No additional producers
2024	Kim Petras	Slut Pop Miami	"Head Head Honcho"	No additional producers
2024	Kim Petras	Slut Pop Miami	"Cubana"	No additional producers
2024	Kim Petras	Slut Pop Miami	"Whale Cock"	No additional producers
2024	Kim Petras	Slut Pop Miami	"Can we fuck?"	No additional producers
2024	Kim Petras	Non-album single	"Ein Tausend Teile"	Fat Max Gsus
2024	LU KALA	Non-album single	"Who's Gonna"	Aaron Joseph, Vaughn Oliver
2024	Katy Perry	143	"Woman's World"	Aaron Joseph, Vaughn Oliver, Rocco Did It Again!
2024	Katy Perry	143	"Lifetimes"	Vaughn Oliver
2024	Katy Perry	143	"Crush"	No additional producers
2024	Katy Perry	143	"All the Love"	Aaron Joseph, KBeaZy, Vaughn Oliver
2024	Katy Perry	143	"Nirvana"	Aaron Joseph, Vaughn Oliver
2024	Katy Perry	143	"Truth"	Vaughn Oliver
2024	Katy Perry	143	"Has a Heart"	Vaughn Oliver
2024	Katy Perry	143	"No Tears for New Year's"	No additional producers
2024	Katy Perry	143	"I Woke Up"	Vaughn Oliver
2024	Katy Perry	143	"OK"	Vaughn Oliver
2024	Katy Perry & JID	143	"Artificial"	KBeaZy
2024	Katy Perry & Doechii	143	"I'm His, He's Mine"	Rocco Did It Again!
2024	Katy Perry & 21 Savage	143	"Gimme Gimme"	Rocco Did It Again!
2024	Katy Perry & Kim Petras	143	"Gorgeous"	Malibu Babie, Vaughn Oliver
2024	BLP KOSHER	Scarecrow	"Cobwebs"	Rocco Did It Again!
2024	Lourdiz	TBA	"Cute"	Ryan OG
2025	Big Boss Vette	TBA	"I Look Like"	No additional producers
2025	LU KALA & SheLailai	No Tears on This Ride	"Work"	Rocco Did It Again!
2025	Lourdiz	TBA	"if i'm being honest"	Ryan OG
2025	Lourdiz	TBA	"if i can't feel you"	No additional producers
2025	Lourdiz	TBA	"To Luv Ya"	No additional producers
2025	7avana	TBA	"BACKFLIPS"	No additional producers
2025	Seyi Vibez & Trippie Redd	FUJI MOTO	"UP"	No additional producers
2025	Big Boss Vette	TBA	"Talk Yo Shit"	No additional producers
2025	SheLailai	Little Miss Crazy B!tch	"Don't Need Him"	No additional producers
2025	SheLailai	Little Miss Crazy B!tch	"No Touchy"	No additional producers
2026	SheLailai	Little Miss Crazy B!tch	"London's Burning"	No additional producers
2026	SheLailai	Little Miss Crazy B!tch	"Pickup"	Vaughn Oliver
2026	BLACKPINK	DEADLINE	"Me and my"	Vaughn Oliver, Tobias Wincorn
2026	BLACKPINK	DEADLINE	"Champion"	No additional producers
2026	Hook	TBA	"Use to"	No additional producers
2026	Katy Perry & Chief Keef	Non-album single	"Legendary Lovers (Save Me)"	Cirkut, Max Martin
2026	MEOVV	BITE NOW	"Hit 'Em"	No additional producers
2026	Senseless Optimism	PAINFULLY POP	"THREE YEARS DOWN"	Senseless Optimism
2026	Senseless Optimism	PAINFULLY POP	"NUMB"	carobae, Delmar, Senseless Optimism
2026	Millaine	Non-album single	"Whining"	Baby E, Cirkut
2026	Lourdiz	Non-album single	"BOOM"	Rocco Did It Again!
2026	Lourdiz	Non-album single	"Kick a Bitch"	No additional producers
2026	Lourdiz	Non-album single	"Rockstar"	No additional producers
2026	Yuki Chiba	EN	"Shinukaikiruka"	No additional producers
2026	R. City & Ayra Starr	Non-album single	"Pray"	KBeaZy
2026	SheLailai & Eem Triplin	Non-album single	"Keeper"	No additional producers

== Unreleased songs ==
Year	Artist	Album	Song	Co-written/produced with
2006	Jeannie Ortega	No Place like BKLYN	"Always on Your Way"	Dave Katz, Danny P, Curtis Richa, Charlie Vox
2006	Jeannie Ortega	No Place like BKLYN	"Set Up"	Dave Katz, Danny P, Curtis Richa, Charlie Vox
2007	Britney Spears	Blackout	"All the Way"	Cathy Dennis, Jack Splash
2007	Unknown	N/A	"Always on Your Side"	Ian Dench, Cathy Dennis, Amanda Ghost
2009	Busta Rhymes	Back on My B.S.	"Antidote"	Busta Rhymes
2010	Christina Aguilera	Bionic	"So What You Got"	Christina Aguilera, Cathy Dennis
2010	Jesse McCartney	Have It All	"Mrs. Mistake"	Ammo, Crystal Nicole
2013	Miley Cyrus	Bangerz	"Nightmare"	Cirkut, Miley Cyrus, Kesha
2013	Miley Cyrus & Nicki Minaj	Bangerz	"Get My Dough"	Ester Dean, Miley Cyrus, Nicki Minaj
2014	AFROJACK	Forget the World	"Arrow"	AFROJACK, Cirkut
2015	LunchMoney Lewis & Becky G	Bills	"Heartbreak Season"	Becky G, Cirkut, JKash, LunchMoney Lewis, Sam Martin
2018	Azealia Banks	Fantasea II: The Second Wave	"Paradiso II"	Azealia Banks, Cirkut
2019	Kim Petras	Clarity	"Move"	Kim Petras
2019	Kim Petras, Azealia Banks & Doja Cat	Clarity	"Sex Up for Fun"	Azealia Banks, Kim Petras, Doja Cat, Jesse Saint John
2021	The Kid LAROI	F*CK LOVE 3: OVER YOU	"Never Know (Can't Lie)"	KBeaZy, The Kid LAROI
2023	Young Thug	BUSINESS IS BUSINESS	"Chairman"	KBeaZy, Young Thug
2023	glaive	i care so much that i don't care at all	"dr. luke song"	glaive

== Top Billboard Songs ==
The following songs peaked #1 on the Billboard Hot 100

Number-one singles

- "Girlfriend" - Avril Lavigne Peak #1
- "I Kissed a Girl" - Katy Perry Peak #1
- "My Life Would Suck Without You" - Kelly Clarkson Peak #1
- "Right Round" - Flo Rida feat. Kesha Peak #1
- "Tik Tok" - Kesha Peak #1
- "California Gurls" - Katy Perry feat. Snoop Dogg Peak #1
- "Teenage Dream" - Katy Perry Peak #1
- "Last Friday Night (T.G.I.F.)" - Katy Perry Peak #1
- "E.T." - Katy Perry feat. Kanye West Peak #1
- "We R Who We R" - Kesha Peak #1
- "Hold It Against Me - Britney Spears Peak #1
- "Part of Me" - Katy Perry Peak #1
- "Wrecking Ball" - Miley Cyrus Peak #1
- "Timber" - Pitbull feat. Kesha Peak #1
- "Roar" - Katy Perry Peak #1
- "Dark Horse" - Katy Perry feat. Juicy J Peak #1
- "Say So" - Doja Cat feat. Nicki Minaj Peak #1
- "Super Freaky Girl" - Nicki Minaj Peak #1

Other Top 10 Hits

- "Since U Been Gone" - Kelly Clarkson Peak #2
- "Behind These Hazel Eyes" - Kelly Clarkson Peak #6
- "Who Knew" - Pink Peak #9
- "U + Ur Hand" - Pink Peak #9
- "Hot n Cold" - Katy Perry Peak #3
- "Circus" - Britney Spears Peak #3
- "Party in the U.S.A." - Miley Cyrus Peak #2
- "Your Love Is My Drug" - Kesha Peak #4
- "Take It Off" - Kesha Peak #8
- "Magic" - B.o.B feat. Rivers Cuomo Peak #10
- "My First Kiss" - 3OH!3 feat. Kesha Peak #9
- "Dynamite" - Taio Cruz Peak #2
- "The One That Got Away" - Katy Perry Peak #3
- "Blow" - Kesha Peak #7
- "Domino" - Jessie J Peak #6
- "Till the World Ends" - Britney Spears Peak #3
- "Good Feeling" - Flo Rida Peak #3
- "Where Have You Been" - Rihanna Peak #5
- "Wide Awake" - Katy Perry Peak #2
- "Strange Clouds" - B.o.B feat. Lil Wayne Peak #7
- "Die Young" - Kesha Peak #2
- "Time of Our Lives" - Pitbull feat. Ne-Yo Peak #9
- "Locked Away" - R. City feat. Adam Levine Peak #6
- "Wishing Well" - Juice Wrld Peak #5
- "Need to Know" - Doja Cat Peak #8
- "Kiss Me More" - Doja Cat feat. SZA Peak #3
- "Big Energy" - Latto Peak #3
- "All My Life" - Lil Durk feat. J. Cole Peak #2
