= Queen Degenerate =

Studio album by Snow Wife
- Released: September 22, 2023
- Length: 18:03
- Labels: Snowglobe, Amigo Records
- Producers: Dr. Luke, David Pramik, Slush Puppy, Jahs, Rocco Did It Again!, Nicasio Arden Fabito, Matthew Holmes, Philip Leigh

Singles from Queen Degenerate
- 1. "American Horror Show" Released: June 23, 2023; 2. "Hit It" Released: September 20, 2023

Queen Degenerate is the debut extended-play by American singer Snow Wife, released on September 22, 2023. The extended-play debuted at #25 on the Billboard Heatseekers Album Chart, and features Big Boss Vette on "Hit It".

== Composition ==
Snow Wife described the aesthetic of Queen Degenerate as a niche queer sub-culture but with pop-leaning production. Shortly after the lead single "American Horror Show" was released in June 2023, Ones to Watch stated "...the entire world [is] thirsting to know more about the industry’s latest obsession...". Rapper Big Boss Vette was featured on the second single "Hit It", which was co-written and co-produced with Dr. Luke. Upon release, this album marked Snow Wife's first entry onto a Billboard chart, debuting at #25 on the Billboard Heatseekers Album Chart.

== Track listing ==
Track listing and credits adapted from Apple Music and Spotify.

Queen Degenerate
No.	Title	Writer(s)	Producer(s)	Length
1.	"Hit It" (featuring Big Boss Vette)	Snow Leann; Big Boss Vette; Lukasz Gottwald; David Pramik; Slush Puppy; Steph Jones	Dr. Luke; David Pramik; Slush Puppy	2:22
2.	"Fuck"	Leann; Puppy; Jonathan Bach; Jahs	Puppy; Jahs	2:15
3.	"All Night"	Joshua Hui; Keegan Bach; Puppy; Leann	KBeaZy; Vitals; Puppy	2:56
4.	"On Fire"	Gottwald; Rocco Valdes; Puppy; Leann	Dr. Luke; Rocco Did It Again!	3:11
5.	"I Love Drugs"	Gottwald; Nicasio Arden Fabito; Puppy; Leann	Puppy; Fabito; Dr. Luke	2:30
6.	"Glow"	Jason Hahs; Nigel Van Hemmye; Puppy; Leann	Puppy; Nydge; Jahs	2:17
7.	"American Horror Show"	Club 97; Hamid Bashir; JBach; Matthew Holmes; Philip Leigh; Puppy; Leann	Stryv; Mac & Phil; Puppy; Jahs	2:29
Total length:				18:03

== Personnel ==
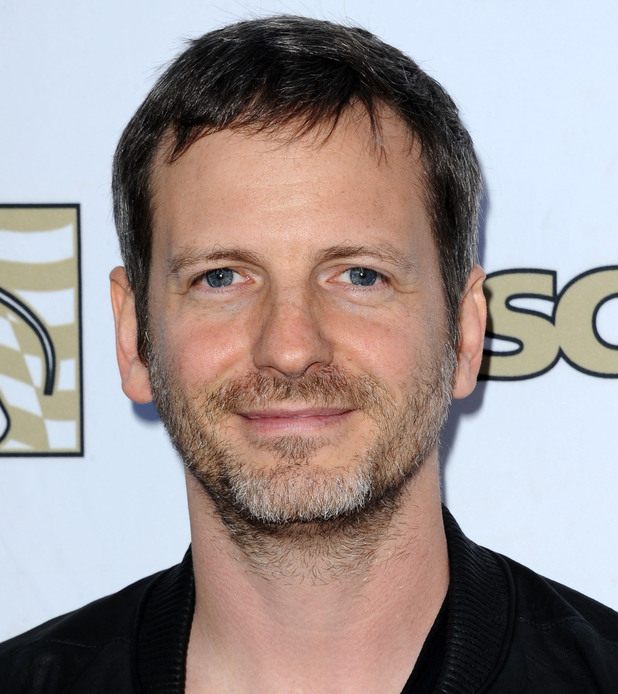
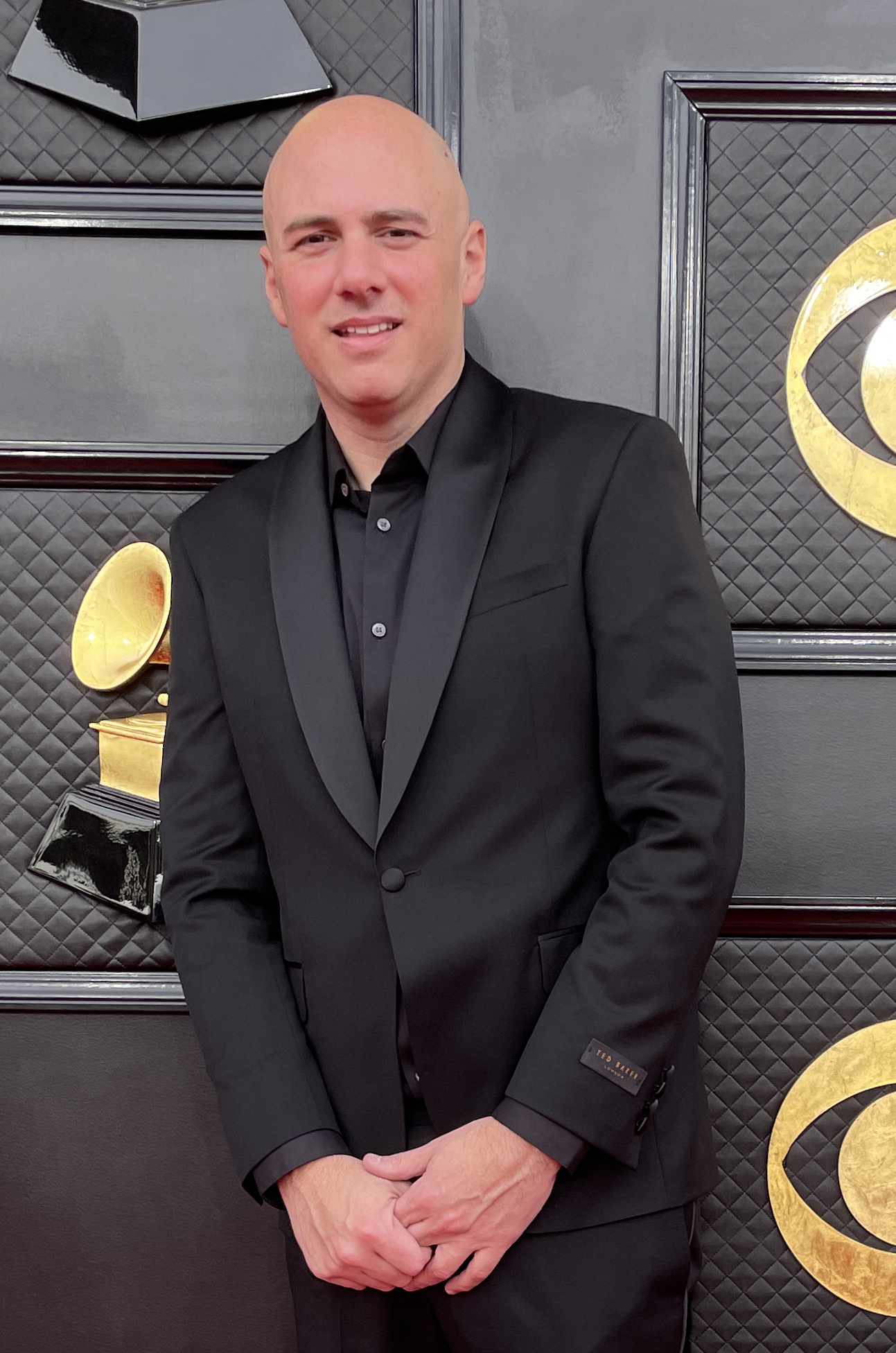
Dr. Luke (left) and Rocco Did It Again! (right) co-produced "On Fire".

Personnel adapted from Apple Music and Spotify.

- Snow Wife – primary artist, composer
- Big Boss Vette – featured artist, composer
- Dr. Luke – composer, producer
- David Pramik – composer, producer
- Slush Puppy – composer, producer
- Jahs – composer, producer
- Rocco Valdes – composer, producer
- Nicasio Arden Fabito – composer, producer
- Matthew Holmes – composer, producer
- Philip Leigh – composer, producer
- Steph Jones – composer
- Jonathan Bach – composer
- Joshua Hui – composer
- Keegan Bach – composer
- Jason Hahs – composer
- Nigel Van Hemmye – composer
- Club 97 – composer
- Hamid Bashir – composer
