= Snow Wife =

American singer (born 2002)

- Born: Emily Leann Snow; May 7, 2002 (age 24); Houston, Texas, US
- Occupations: Singer; actor
- Years active: 2023–present
- Label: Snowglobe
- Website: itssnowwife.com

Emily Leann Snow, known professionally as Snow Wife, is an American singer.

== Personal life ==
Snow Wife is originally from Houston, Texas. She (Note: Snow Wife uses both she/her and they/them pronouns. This article uses she/her for consistency.) originally started as a professional dancer before pivoting to music. She identifies as queer.

== Career ==
In June 2023, she released "American Horror Show", the lead single for her debut EP, Queen Degenerate. The EP debuted at #25 on Billboard's Heatseekers Albums chart. Her follow-up single, "Hit It", featured rapper Big Boss Vette.

In March 2024 she released "Wet Dream", which Paper Magazine called a "fuzzy, sexy ride." For the music video, she collaborated with queer-owned brands. She performed at WeHo Pride in June 2024. On June 28, 2024, Snow Wife released the single "Pool". Paper Magazine noted how it channels the music of Brooke Candy and Britney Spears.

Snow Wife releases music through her imprint Snowglobe, distributed by AWAL.

In June 2025 she released her second EP Bodyology, followed by an expanded edition Bodyology II, featuring three additional songs.

== Discography ==
All credits adapted from Apple Music and Spotify.

=== Singles ===
==== As lead artist ====
Year	Title	Album	Writer(s)	Producer(s)	Certification(s)
2023	"7FIGURESUPERMODEL"	Non-album single	Justin Donahue, Charles Stephens III, Jon Santana, Snow Leann	Charles "Chizzy" Stephens III, Jon Santana, Slush Puppy, Jahs	
2023	"American Horror Show"	Queen Degenerate	Club 97, Hamid Bashir, JBach, Matthew Holmes, Philip Leigh, Slush Puppy, Snow Leann	Stryv, Mac & Phil, Slush Puppy, Jahs	RIAA Gold (August 25, 2025)
2023	"Hit It" (with Big Boss Vette)	Queen Degenerate	David Pramik, Dr. Luke, Diamond Smith, Slush Puppy, Steph Jones, Snow Leann	David Pramik, Dr. Luke, Slush Puppy	
2023	"GLOW"	Queen Degenerate	Jason Hahs, Nigel Van Hemmye, Slush Puppy, Snow Leann	Slush Puppy, Nydge, Jahs	
2023	"ALL NIGHT"	Queen Degenerate	Joshua Hui, Keegan Bach, Slush Puppy, Snow Leann	KBeaZy, VITALS, Slush Puppy	
2024	"Wet Dream"	Non-album singles	Atlgrandma, Lil Aaron, Snow Leann	Atlgrandma, Lil Aaron	
2024	"Pool"	Non-album singles	Emily Leann Snow, JBach, Liam Benayon, Samuel Catalano	Slush Puppy, Liam Benayon	
2024	“Crazy”	Non-album singles	Ajay Bhattacharyya, JBach, Rebecca Black, Snow Wife	Stint	
2025	"What Do Girls Do?"	data-sort-value="" style="background: var(--background-color-interactive, #ececec); color: var(--color-base, inherit); vertical-align: middle; text-align: center; " class="table-na" | Non-album singles	JBach, Jesse Saint John, Slush Puppy, Snow Leann	Slush Puppy	
2025	"Bodyology"	data-sort-value="" style="background: var(--background-color-interactive, #ececec); color: var(--color-base, inherit); vertical-align: middle; text-align: center; " class="table-na" | Non-album singles	Jordan Brasko Gable, JBach, Slush Puppy, Snow Leann, Jesse Saint John	Slush Puppy	
2025	"Sweat"	data-sort-value="" style="background: var(--background-color-interactive, #ececec); color: var(--color-base, inherit); vertical-align: middle; text-align: center; " class="table-na" | Non-album singles	Jason Hahs, Jesse Saint John, Snow Leann, Tim Nelson	TimFromTheHouse, Jahs, Slush Puppy	
2025	"Pumps"	Bodyology II	JBach, Jordan Brasko, Slush Puppy, Snow Leann	Slush Puppy	
2025	"My Body" (featuring Slush Puppy)	Bodyology II		Slush Puppy	
2025	"I'm A Robot"	Bodyology II		Slush Puppy	

==== As featured artist ====
Year	Title	Album	Writer(s)	Producer(s)	Certification(s)
2026	"red bikini" (Hayley Kiyoko and Snow Wife)	girls like girls the album	Hayley Kiyoko, Emily Leann Snow, Jessica Renae Corazza, Patrick Morrissey	Patrick Morrissey	

=== Extended plays ===
Title	Details
Queen Degenerate	Released: September 22, 2023; Label: Amigo Records, Snowglobe; Formats: Digital download, streaming
Bodyology	Released: June 6, 2025; Label: Amigo Records, Snowglobe; Formats: Digital download, streaming
Bodyology II	Released: October 31, 2025; Label: Amigo Records, Snowglobe; Formats: Digital download, streaming

== Tours ==
=== Bodyology Summer Tour ===
==== Background ====
The tour accompanied the release of Snow's first EP, Bodyology. It had six dates, including Governors Ball, Indy Pride Festival, and Summerfest.

==== Tour dates ====
Date	City	Venue	Opening acts
May 31, 2025	Washington, D.C.	The Atlantis	Xkylar
June 3, 2025	Philadelphia	The Foundry	Xkylar
June 6, 2025	Boston	Brighton Music Hall	Xkylar
June 8, 2025	New York City	The Governors Ball	Xkylar
June 15, 2025	Indianapolis	Indy Pride Festival	Xkylar
June 20, 2025	Milwaukee	Summerfest	Xkylar

=== As supporting act ===
- Psychopomp Tour (Isabel Larosa) (2025)
