= Big Boss Vette =

American rapper (born 1997)

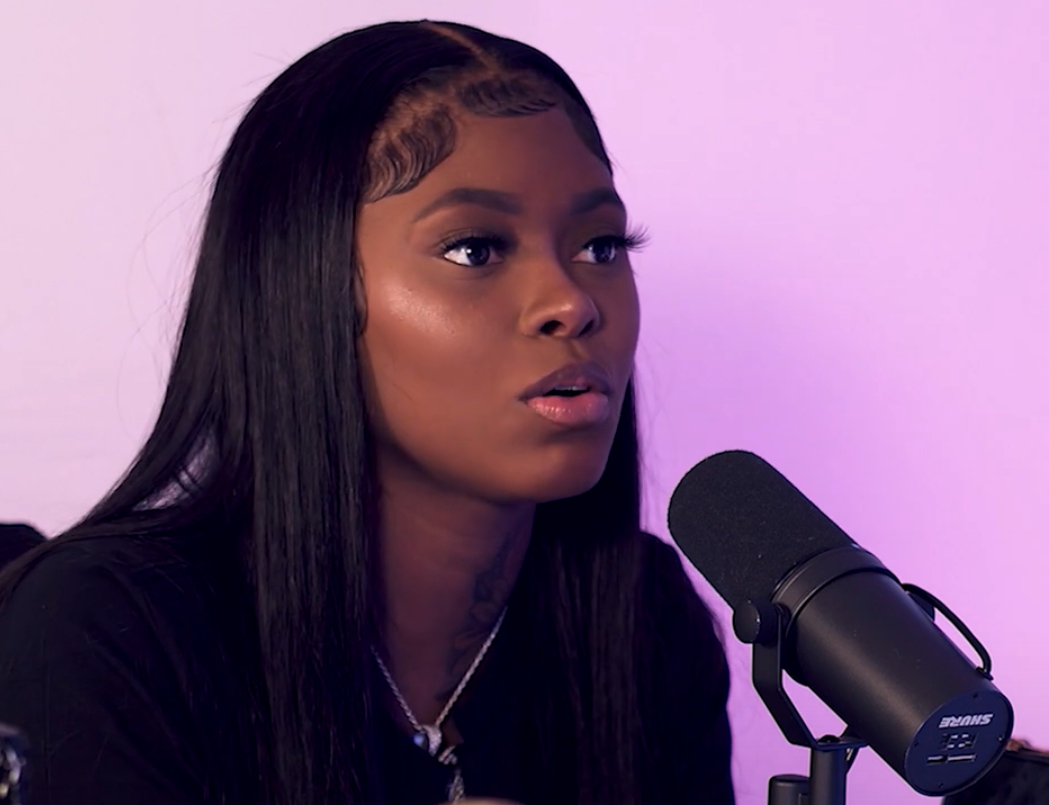
- Big Boss Vette in 2022

Background information
- Born: Diamond Alexxis Smith; October 16, 1997 (age 28)
- Origin: St. Louis, Missouri, US
- Genres: Hip hop
- Years active: 2019–present
- Label: Republic

Diamond Alexxis Smith (born October 16, 1997), better known by her stage name Big Boss Vette, is an American rapper from St. Louis, Missouri.

== Career ==
In 2019, she published her first song, "Dog Ass Nigga". Vette signed to Republic Records after her song "Bad Bitch" saw success on YouTube. In January 2022, Arielle Lana LeJarde of Pitchfork called Vette's song "Heavy" the must-hear song of the day. Her song "Snatched" achieved viral success on the social media application TikTok. XXL called the song a "summer staple".

== Personal life ==
Vette was shot in 2016 during a fight.

== Discography ==
=== EPs ===
List of EPs with selected details
Title	Details
RESILIENCE	Released: July 20, 2023; Label: Republic Records; Format: Digital download, streaming

=== Singles ===
==== As lead artist ====
List of singles as lead artist, with selected details
Title	Year	Album
"Dog Ass Nigga"	2019	Non-album singles
"Big Yvette"	2020	Non-album singles
"Outside"	2020	Non-album singles
"3AM Freestyle"	2020	Non-album singles
"No Fakin"	2021	Non-album singles
"Make 'Em Mad"	2021	Non-album singles
"Eater"	2021	Non-album singles
"Big Boss Vette"	2021	Non-album singles
"Heavy"	2022	Non-album singles
"Snatched"	2022	Non-album singles
"Snatched Remix" (with Flo Milli and Saucy Santana)	2022	Non-album singles
"How TF" (with SleazyWorld Go)	2022	Non-album singles
"Pretty Girls Walk"	2022	Non-album singles
"Pretty Girls Walk (Remix)" (with Coi Leray)	2023	Non-album singles
"Problem"	2023	Non-album singles
"Ion Need"	2023	Non-album singles
"Karma"	2023	Non-album singles

==== As featured artist ====
List of singles as lead artist, with selected details
Title	Year	Album
"Poof Be Gone (Feat. Cheerlebridee)" (KyleYouMadeThat feat. Yung Baby Tate, Cheerlebridee, and Yvette)	2021	Non-album single
"Throw It! - Remix" (Spiffy The Goat feat. Big Boss Vette)	2023	Non-album single
"I Can't Stop" (Metro Boomin with Big Boss Vette and Omah Lay)	2023	Spider-Man: Across the Spider-Verse (Soundtrack from and Inspired by the Motion Picture)
"Keep Dat Part 2" (Icandy featuring Kaliii, GloRilla, and Big Boss Vette)	2023	Non-album single
"Money Come (Remix)" (Iggy Azalea feat. Big Boss Vette and Ivorian Doll)	2023	Non-album single
"Hit It" (Snow Wife feat. Big Boss Vette)	2023	Queen Degenerate
