= Super Music Group =

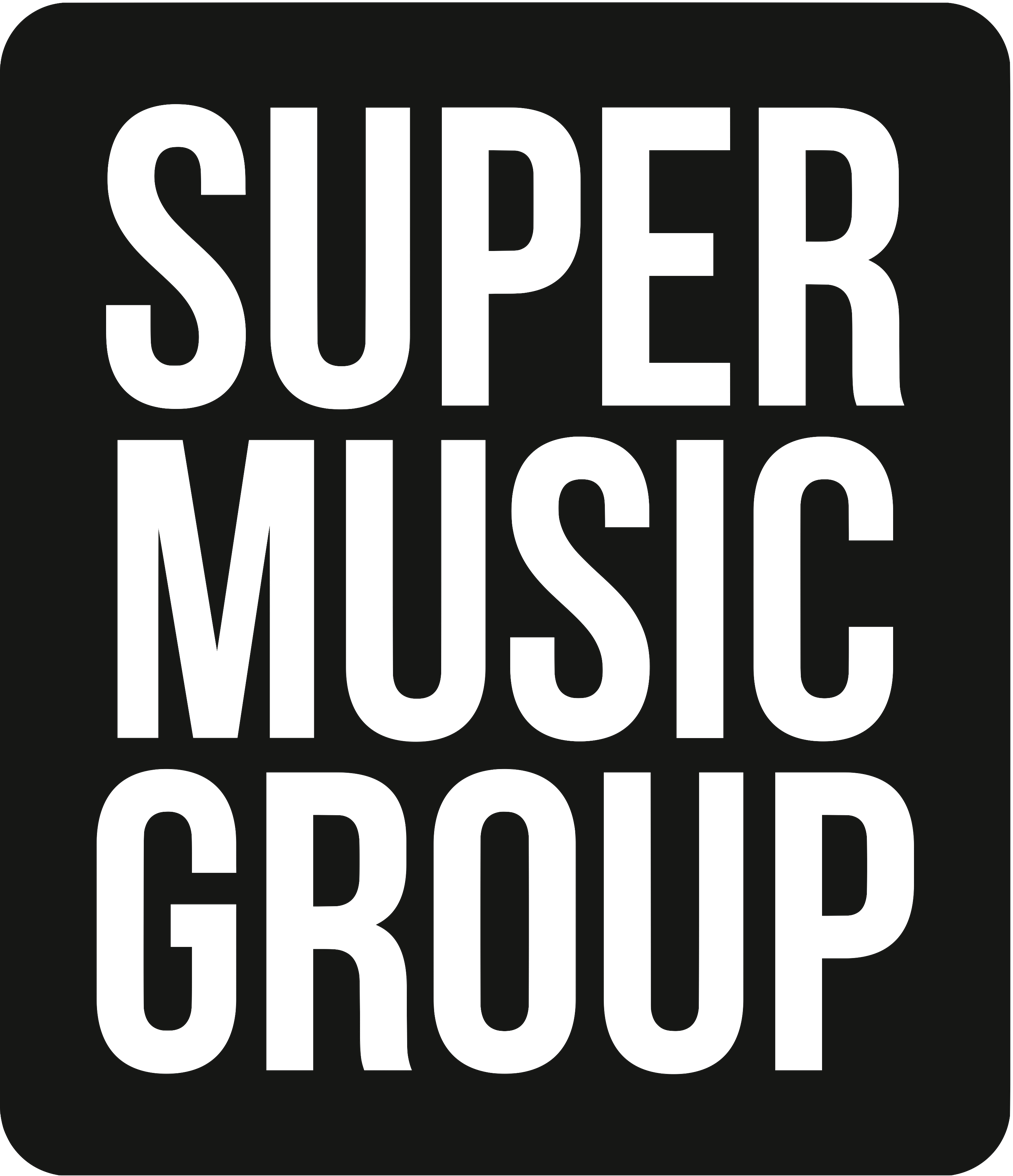
- Company type: Private
- Industry: Music & Entertainment
- Founded: 2010; 16 years ago
- Founders: Derek Walin; Brandon Kessler
- Headquarters: Miami, Florida, U.S.
- Key people: Jake Jefferson; Brandon Kessler; Derek Walin
- Services: Management; Record Label; Music publishing
- Divisions: Super Management; Super Records; SUPERPUB (Publishing)
- Website: supermusicgroup.com

Super Music Group is a Miami, Florida based artist management company and record label. The company was founded in 2010 by Derek Walin and Brandon Kessler. In 2013 partners Aramis Lorie and Jake Jefferson, of Miami's Poplife Entertainment joined the firm.

They specialize in the management of recording artists, DJs, and record producers.

Their current management roster includes:

- Amtrac
- Ape Drums
- DJ Craze (3 Time DMC World DJ Champion - only person to win 3X in a row)
- DJ DZA
- Durante
- Helado Negro
- Luces
- Promnite
- Projexx
- Silent Addy
- Steven A. Clark

In 2014, Super Music Group was named Miami's Best Record Label by the Miami New Times

In 2015, Billboard reported that dance music star Kaskade and his longtime manager Little Empire Music had acquired a minority ownership stake in Super Music Group.“It became apparent that not only do we have like-minded taste in music, but that these guys deliver at every possible opportunity," said Kaskade. “They’re a talented group of executives that operate like a close-knit family alongside their inspired roster of artists," added Little Empire founder Stephanie LaFera. "I’m excited to go deeper into business with Super and to grow with one another.”

Super Music Group has been featured in style.com, Ocean Drive Magazine, and Miami New Times.
