= Climate Change (album) =

Studio album by Pitbull
- Released: March 17, 2017
- Genre: Pop-rap
- Length: 44:16
- Label: RCA; Polo Grounds; Mr. 305
- Producer: Jimmy Joker; AJ Junior; IAmChino; Jorge Gomez; Ian Kirkpatrick; DJ White Shadow; Kro'Nic; Wilberto Madera; Leonardo Brooks; Ricky Reed; Thomas Peyton; Dr. Luke; Cirkut; Twice as Nice; Jerome Price; Michael Mayeda; Richard Pearl; Al Burna; Genarro "Geronimo" Schiano; Jason Evigan; The Monsters & Strangerz; Alex Ross; Calper; Ape Drums

Pitbull chronology
Dale (2015)	Climate Change (2017)	Greatest Hits (2017)

Singles from Climate Change
- 1. "Messin' Around" Released: April 8, 2016; 2. "Greenlight" Released: July 22, 2016; 3. "Options" Released: February 17, 2017; 4. "Better On Me" Released: March 17, 2017

Climate Change is the tenth studio album by Cuban-American rapper Pitbull. It was released on March 17, 2017, through RCA Records, Polo Grounds Music and Mr. 305 Inc. The production on the album was handled by multiple producers including Dr. Luke, Ricky Reed, Ian Kirkpatrick, Cirkut and The Monsters & Strangerz among others. The album also features guest appearances by Kiesza, Robin Thicke, Travis Barker, Flo Rida, Enrique Iglesias, Stephen Marley, Ty Dolla Sign, Jennifer Lopez, Jason Derulo, Austin Mahone and R. Kelly among others.

Climate Change was supported by four singles: "Messin' Around", "Greenlight", "Options" and "Better On Me". The album received generally positive reviews from music critics but despite that received small commercial success. The album debuted at number 29 on the US Billboard 200 chart, earning 14,000 album-equivalent units in its first week.

== Background ==
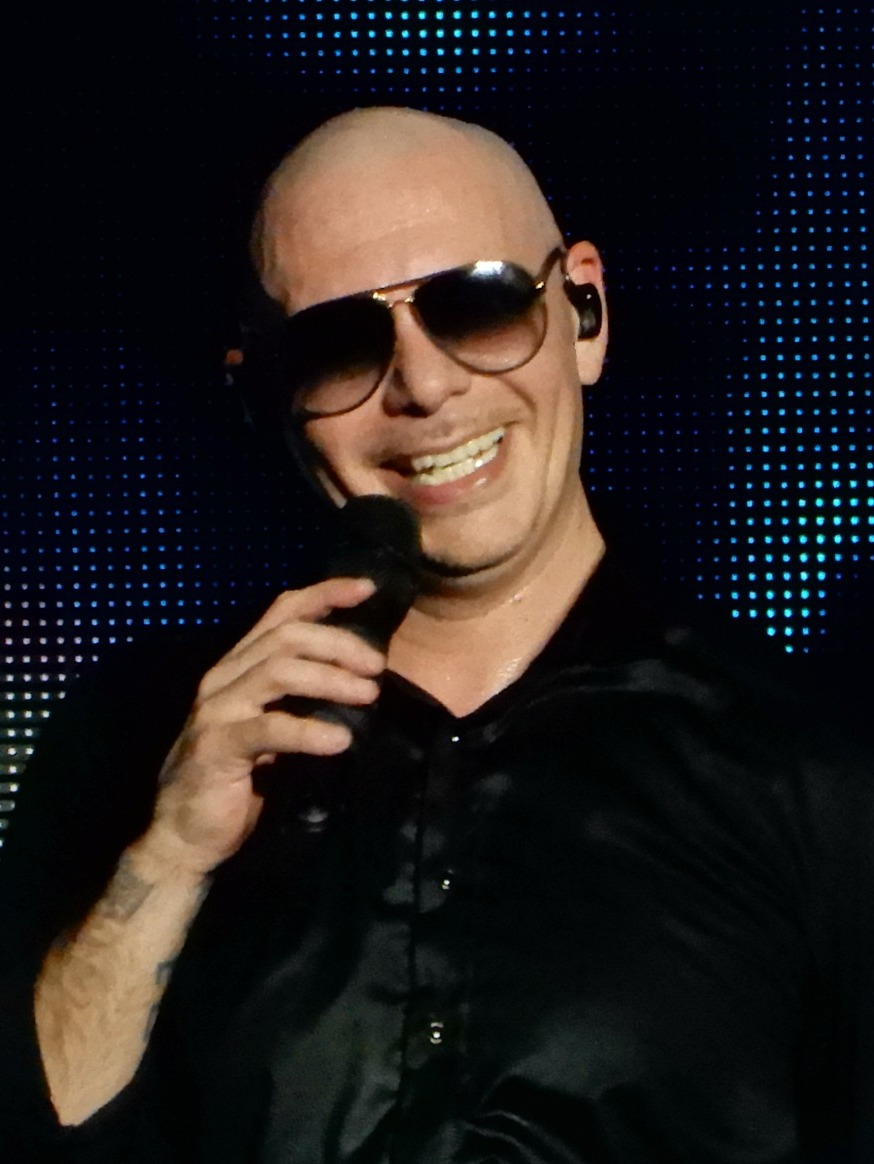
Pitbull performing in 2018

Despite the delay of release date, Pitbull announced the album would be released on March 17, 2017, on Twitter. "Can't Have", "Options" and "Greenlight" were released as singles off the album. In October 2016, he said "As of right now, we’re looking at 2017, but you never know. Album (release dates) always change. Right now we’re working on two records in the thirteenth hour with very, very interesting features that will also be part of Climate Change".

A world tour for the album was scheduled to kick off in Asia for a 10 concert run, but was cancelled at the last minute. IME stated on May 11, 2017 "We are extremely sorry to announce that Pitbull’s Climate Change Tour in Asia has been cancelled due to scheduling conflicts." to address the cancellation of the tour.

== Singles ==
"Messin' Around" featuring Enrique Iglesias was released on April 8, 2016 as the lead single of the album. On May 25, 2016, Pitbull uploaded the music video for "Messin' Around" on his YouTube and Vevo account. It peaked at number sixty-four in the United States.

On July 25, 2016, Pitbull released "Greenlight" featuring Flo Rida and LunchMoney Lewis as the album's second single. Its music video was released on August 19, 2016.

"Options" featuring Stephen Marley was released on February 17, 2017, as the third single from the album. Its official music video was uploaded on Pitbull's Vevo on March 17, 2017, the same date as the album's release. The two also performed the song live at WWE WrestleMania 33.

On March 17, 2017, Pitbull released "Better On Me" featuring Ty Dolla Sign as the album's release accompanying single. Its music video was released on January 12, 2018.

=== Promotional singles ===
"Freedom" was released on January 8, 2016. The official music video was uploaded to Pitbull's Vevo on February 10, 2016.

"Bad Man" featuring Robin Thicke, Joe Perry and Travis Barker was released on February 14, 2016, and was performed the following night as the closing number to the 58th Annual Grammy Awards. The official music video was uploaded to Pitbull's VEVO channel on April 20, 2017.

=== Other songs ===
"FREE.K" was released on October 23, 2015. It was intended to be included in Climate Change, but it did not make the final cut for the standard edition. However, the song was included on the Japanese release of the album under the title "Freak".

"Educate Ya" serves as track 9 to the album which features vocals from American singer-songwriter Jason Derulo.

"Dedicated" serves as track 11 to the album which features vocals from American singers R. Kelly and Austin Mahone.

== Commercial performance ==
Professional ratings
Aggregate scores
Source	Rating
Metacritic	63/100
Review scores
Source	Rating
AllMusic	4/5 stars
Idolator	3.5/5
Knox News	3.5/5
Pop Magazine	3/5 stars
Rolling Stone	3/5 stars
Tiny Mix Tapes	.5/5 marks
The Young Folks	6/10

Climate Change debuted at number 29 on the US Billboard 200 chart, earning 14,000 album-equivalent units (including 11,000 copies as pure album sales) in its first week. The album also debuted at number 12 on the US Top Rap Albums chart.

== Track listing ==
No.	Title	Writer(s)	Producer(s)	Length
1.	"We Are Strong" (featuring Kiesza)	Armando Christian Pérez; Jimmy Thörnfeldt; Maxwell Kernich; Kiesa Rae Ellestad; Jose Garcia; Wilberto Madera; Michael Chapman; Holly Erlander; Leonardo Brooks; Jorge Gomez; Achraf Janussi	Jimmy Joker; IAMCHINO; AJ Junior; Gomez; Brooks^{[a]}; Will "Chilly Willy" Madera^{[a]}	3:36
2.	"Bad Man" (featuring Robin Thicke, Joe Perry and Travis Barker)	Pérez; Jenny Owen Youngs; Davey Nate; Thomas Peyton; Eric Frederic	Ricky Reed; Peyton^{[a]}; Joe London^{[b]}	3:35
3.	"Greenlight" (featuring Flo Rida and LunchMoney Lewis)	Pérez; Tramar Dillard; Gamal Lewis; Lukasz Gottwald; Henry Walter	Dr. Luke; Cirkut	4:05
4.	"Messin' Around" (featuring Enrique Iglesias)	Pérez; Enrique Preyslar; Garcia; Gomez; Janussi; Thornfeldt; Michael Calderon; Gary Richrath	Jimmy Joker; Gomez; IAMCHINO; AJ Junior	3:42
5.	"Better on Me" (featuring Ty Dolla Sign)	Pérez; Tyrone Griffin Jr.; Nicholas Audino; Lewis Hughes; Khaled Rohaim; Te Whiti Warbrick; Noel Fisher; Jason Boyd	Twice as Nice	3:47
6.	"Sexy Body" (with Jennifer Lopez)	Pérez; Jennifer Lopez; Jerome Price; Luke Calleja; Michael Mayeda; Al Sherrod Lambert; Karen Chin; Anthony Kelly; Cheri Williams; Joey Washington; Dwayne Richardson; Derek Jenkins; Cassio Ware	Mayeda; Kronic; Price; DJ White Shadow	3:43
7.	"Freedom"	Pérez; Mick Jagger; Keith Richards; Richard Pearl	Pearl	2:55
8.	"Options" (featuring Stephen Marley)	Pérez; Stephen Marley; Jason Evigan; Joshua Gallander; Mitchel Allan Scherr; Samuel Denison Martin; Ian Kirkpatrick; Sean Douglas	Kirkpatrick	3:59
9.	"Educate Ya" (featuring Jason Derulo)	Pérez; Kirkpatrick; Evigan; Lindy Robbins; Jordan K. Johnson; Stefan Johnson; Marcus Lomax	Kirkpatrick; Evigan; The Monsters & Strangerz	3:33
10.	"Only Ones to Know" (featuring Leona Lewis)	Pérez; Leona Lewis; Alex Ross; Edwin Paredes; Martin Oetegenn; Deborah Aramide; Jamie Harper; Autumn Rowe	Ross	3:50
11.	"Dedicated" (featuring R. Kelly and Austin Mahone)	Pérez; Robert Kelly; Austin Mahone; Xavier Dunn; Calleja	Kronic; DJ White Shadow	3:56
12.	"Can't Have" (featuring Steven A. Clark and Ape Drums)	Pérez; Steven Clark; Eric Alberto-Lopez; Sam Hyken; Steve Sanz	Ape Drums	3:35
Total length:				44:16

Japan edition bonus tracks
No.	Title	Length
13.	"FREE.K"
14.	"Green Light" (TJR Extended Mix) (featuring Flo Rida and LunchMoney Lewis)
15.	"Options" (Chuckie Remix) (featuring Stephen Marley)
16.	"Bad Man" (DJ Drew Remix) (featuring Robin Thicke, Joe Perry and Travis Barker)

Notes

- ^a signifies a co-producer
- ^b signifies an additional producer
- "We Are Strong" featuring Kiesza interpolates "Love Is a Battlefield", written by Michael Chapman and Holly Erlander, and performed by Pat Benatar.
- "Messin' Around" with Enrique Iglesias interpolates "Take It on the Run" by REO Speedwagon.
- "Freedom" interpolates "I'm Free" by The Soup Dragons.
- "Sexy Body" with Jennifer Lopez interpolates "Dat Sexy Body" by Sacha.

Featured Artists

- Kiesza, track 1
- Robin Thicke, track 2
- Joe Perry, track 2
- Travis Barker, track 2
- Flo Rida, track 3
- LunchMoney Lewis, track 3
- Enrique Iglesias, track 4
- Ty Dolla $ign, track 5
- Jennifer Lopez, track 6
- Stephen Marley, track 8
- Jason Derulo, track 9
- Leona Lewis, track 10
- R. Kelly, track 11
- Austin Mahone, track 11
- Steven A. Clark, track 12
- Ape Drums, track 12

== Charts ==
Weekly chart performance
Chart (2017)	Peak position
Australian Albums (ARIA)	74
Belgian Albums (Ultratop Flanders)	161
Belgian Albums (Ultratop Wallonia)	186
Canadian Albums (Billboard)	20
Finnish Albums (Suomen virallinen lista)	11
Swiss Albums (Schweizer Hitparade)	69
US Billboard 200	29
US Top Rap Albums (Billboard)	12
