= Amtrac (musician) =

American DJ and electronic music producer (born 1987)

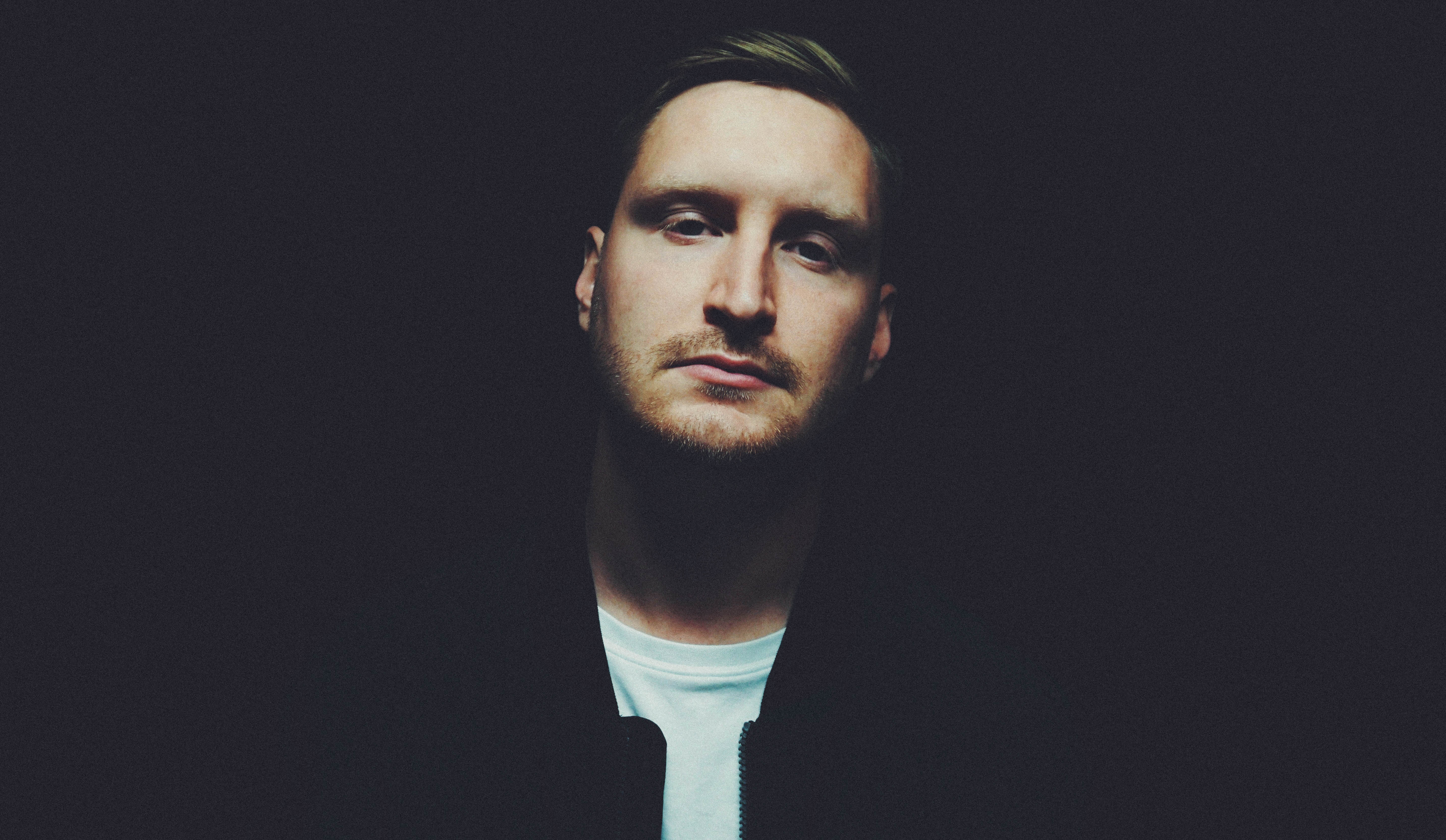

Background information
- Also known as: Amtrac
- Born: Caleb Cornett; May 19, 1987 (age 39); Morehead, Kentucky, United States
- Genres: house, indie dance, indietronica, IDM, progressive house
- Occupations: Producer, musician
- Instruments: DAW, vocals, synthesizer, bass, drums
- Years active: 2010–present
- Label: OPENERS / RCA Records
- Website: http://www.amtr.ac

Caleb Cornett (born May 19, 1987), known professionally as Amtrac, is an American DJ, electronic music producer, singer, multi-instrumentalist, and songwriter.

== Career ==
=== Early career ===
Born and raised in Morehead, Kentucky, he now lives in Louisville, Kentucky and is signed to Miami, Florida -based management company Super Music Group. His first music video, "Came Along", debuted on MTV's Clubland in October 2011.

About the song, tastemaker website RCRDLBL said "Amtrac, the solo project of Kentucky's Caleb Cornett, has just the right mixture of pop and cutting-edge sonics to break through the void. On 'Came Along,' Amtrac guides a rapid, crunchy beat and electric piano figures to a thoroughly mature songwriting space. He's restless, though. This poise quickly evolves into spliced samples flickering across the track in microtonal dots—a true dancefloor deconstruction."

=== Rise to Fame ===
Amtrac played at Detroit Electronic Music Festival, Forecastle Festival and Osheaga Festival in 2013.

In 2013, Amtrac remixed Kaskade's single "Atmosphere" and the remix was released on Ultra Records. He also appeared on the Atmosphere tour with stops at Brooklyn's Barclay's Center Miami's American Airlines Arena, Navy Pier in Chicago, and Shrine Expo Hall in Los Angeles.

In 2014, Amtrac played Ultra Music Festival, Mysteryland USA, EDC Las Vegas, Moonrise Festival and supported Kygo on his first tour throughout the US and Europe. He also did a co-headline tour throughout the US with DJ/producer, Kastle, in which they collaborated on single "Hyperspace" in name of the tour. Other music releases in 2015 came as a 2-song EP for Black Book Audio and a single "Those Days" on Mark Knight's Toolroom Records. "Those Days" featured a vocal sample from legend Stevie Wonder and was approved by his team for official release.

In 2015, Amtrac was invited to play on Holy Ship and played BPM Festival in Playa Del Carmen, Mexico. He followed up his release on Toolroom Records with a new single for them titled "Hold On", this time featuring a vocal sample from Marvin Gaye. Other festivals played in 2015 included CRSSD Fest in San Diego, Shambhala Festival, Digital Dreams Festival in Toronto, Escapade Festival in Ottawa, Splash House in Palm Springs, Paradiso Festival in Washington state and Your Paradise in FIJI. He closed out 2015 by headed out on tour w. Gorgon City as direct support for their North American tour.

2016 saw Amtrac heading to Asia for Shipsomnia and then straight to Mexico for another play at BPM Festival. He self-released his "Lost In Motion" EP in January, which received much praise within the DJ community. He followed the release of the EP with a headline tour of North America. He returned to Miami for WMC and shortly after did his first Mixmag Lab. He returned to EDC Las Vegas and Mysteryland in Bethel Woods, New York. He released a 2-song EP on Kidnap Kid's label "Birds That Fly" in August 2016 and a few weeks later released another 2 song EP on Waze and Odyssey's label Street Tracks. He joined Pete Tong for the NYC Edition of his All Gone Pete Tong showcase and is slated for upcoming appearances at III Points Festival in Miami.

Amtrac has been mentioned and received praise from publications like Billboard, Pitchfork, Mixmag, MTV, Revolt, Complex and i-D magazine.

=== "1987" ===
In 2017, Amtrac created his own record label Openers. Amtrac launched the label with his release of his 1987 EP that would go on to accumulate tens of millions of streams across all platforms. This EP contained the song "Informal Disco", which references the birth of Amtrac himself. The "informal disco" of the song references the good times Amtrac's parents enjoyed while his mother was pregnant and expecting the child. The end of the song references his mother giving birth. As of May 2019, the label has released 39 songs from various artists including Durante, Rick Trainor and Luces.

=== "Oddyssey" ===
On April 3, 2020, Amtrac released his long-awaited second LP "Oddyssey," which he described as "like the odyssey of my life up until this point."

== Discography ==
=== Albums ===
- Came Along (2011)
- Oddyssey (2020)
- Extra Time (2023)

=== Extended plays ===
- Why (2010)
- Without Warning (2013) (with The Pass)
- Lost in Motion (2016)
- Running After / No Order (2016)
- Farewell / Renton (2016)
- 1987 (2017)
- True Value (2017)
- Generator (2025)

=== Singles ===
- "In Love" (2010)
- "Why You Look So Blue" (2010)
- "Primal" (2014)
- "Undefeated" (2014)
- "Those Days" (2014)
- "Yep" (with Kaskade) (2014)
- "Hyperspace" (with Kastle) (2014)
- "Hold On" (2015)
- "ELEV8" (2015) (with Alex Metric)
- "Darkest Sound" (2015)
- "Lover"(2015)
- "Homebound" (2017)
- "Companions" (2017)
- "Old Times (featuring Anabel Englund)" (2018)
- "Madness to Mayhem" (2018)
- "Just" (2019)
- "Formal Disco" (2019)
- "Formal Disco (Project Pablo Remix)" (2019)
- "Between The Lines" (2019)
- "Radical (Edit)" (2020) (with Totally Enormous Extinct Dinosaurs)
- "Accountable" (2020)
- "Teenage Love (featuring Saint Kenaire)" (2020)
- "So Afraid (featuring Alex Metric)" (2020)
- "Stratego" (2020)

== Remixes ==
- "Washed Out – Hide (Amtrac Remix)"
- "Fred Falke feat. Elohim and Mansions on the Moon – It's a Memory (Amtrac Remix)"
- "Ellie Herring – What To Know (Amtrac Remix)"
- "Treasure Fingers – It's Love (Amtrac Remix)"
- "Oskar – Somebody (Amtrac Remix)"
- "Kreap – Housebreak (Amtrac Remix)"
- "Snakadaktal – Dance Bear (Amtrac Remix)"
- "Telephoned – Last Time (Amtrac Remix)"
- "Viceroy Feat. Ghost Beach – While Were in Love (Amtrac Remix)"
- "Milwaukee – Alone (Amtrac Remix)"
- "Azari & III – Lost in Time (Amtrac Remix)"
- "Ellie Goulding – Without Your Love (Amtrac Remix)"
- "Wretch 32 Feat. Shakka – Blackout (Amtrac Remix)"
- "The Knocks Feat. St. Lucia – Modern Hearts (Amtrac Remix)"
- "Toyboy & Robin – Jaded (Amtrac Remix)"
- "The Pass – Without Warning (Amtrac Remix)"
- "Two Door Cinema Club – Handshake (Amtrac Remix)"
- "Kaskade – Atmosphere (Amtrac Remix)"
- "Kill the Noise Feat. Brillz & Minxx – Saturn (Amtrac Remix)"
- "The Swiss – Kiss to Kiss (Amtrac Remix)"
- "CamelPhat feat. A*M*E – Paradigm (Amtrac's Temptation Mix)"
- "Duke Dumont Feat. A M E – Need U (100%) (Amtrac Remix)"
- "Client Liaison – Free of Fear (Amtrac Remix)"
- "ZHU – Faded (Amtrac Remix)"
- "Tough Love – Dreams (Amtrac Remix)"
- "RAC Feat. Matthew Koma – Cheap Sunglasses (Amtrac Remix)"
- "Shakka – When Will I See You Again (Amtrac Remix)"
- "Alesso Feat. Tove Lo – Heroes (Amtrac Remix)"
- "Axwell and Ingrosso – Something New (Amtrac Remix)"
- "Steven A. Clark – Found (Amtrac Remix)"
