= Doin' It (Big Boi song) =

Single by Big Boi
- B-side: "Return of the Dope Boi"
- Released: February 1, 2019
- Length: 6:13
- Label: Hitco
- Songwriters: Renegade El Rey; Dr. Luke; Theron Thomas; Antwan Patton

Big Boi singles chronology
"All Night" (2017)	"Doin' It" (2019)

"Doin' It" is a song by American rapper Big Boi featuring Sleepy Brown, released as a single on February 1, 2019, through L.A. Reid's label Hitco. The single also features the song "Return of the Dope Boi" featuring Killer Mike and Backbone. Its release preceded Big Boi's Super Bowl LIII halftime show performance with Maroon 5 on February 3, and serves as his follow-up to 2017's Boomiverse.

== Critical reception ==
HotNewHipHop called the track "very hot", and said Big Boi and Sleepy Brown are a "time-tested duo" following their collaboration on 2004's "The Way You Move", from Speakerboxxx/The Love Below. Consequence of Sound called "Doin' It" "intergalactic", while Stereogum noted that it is "poppier" compared to "Return of the Dope Boi", which it called "harder-hitting". Rolling Stone echoed a similar sentiment, calling "Doin' It" a "radio-friendly pop-rap tune, with the Outkast emcee musing about eternal love over upbeat piano chords" and "Return of the Dope Boi" a "grittier cut full of staccato flexing and punctuated tag-teamed boasts, adorned with funk guitar stabs and orchestral synth lines". Spin thought "Doin' It" had "soul undertones", while "Return of the Dope Boi" featured "heavier production and a standout verse from Backbone". Writing for Forbes, Chris Malone Méndez wrote that "Doin' It" could "easily pass as a Lizzo song, which raises the question of how different it could've been with a chorus provided by the R&B songstress". Rap-Up also felt that "Doin' It" contains a "soulful hook from longtime collaborator Sleepy Brown and some syrupy rhymes from Big Boi".

== Music video ==
A music video was released for "Doin' It" on February 6, 2019. It features an appearance from Sherlita Patton, Big Boi's wife. iHeartRadio noted that the video includes a "ton of owls, Sleepy Brown on the piano, and shots of the rapper just doin' it".

== Track listing ==
No.	Title	Length
1.	"Doin' It" (featuring Sleepy Brown)	3:12
2.	"Return of the Dope Boi" (featuring Killer Mike and Backbone)	3:01
Total length:		6:13
