= LunchMoney Lewis =

American rapper (born 1988)

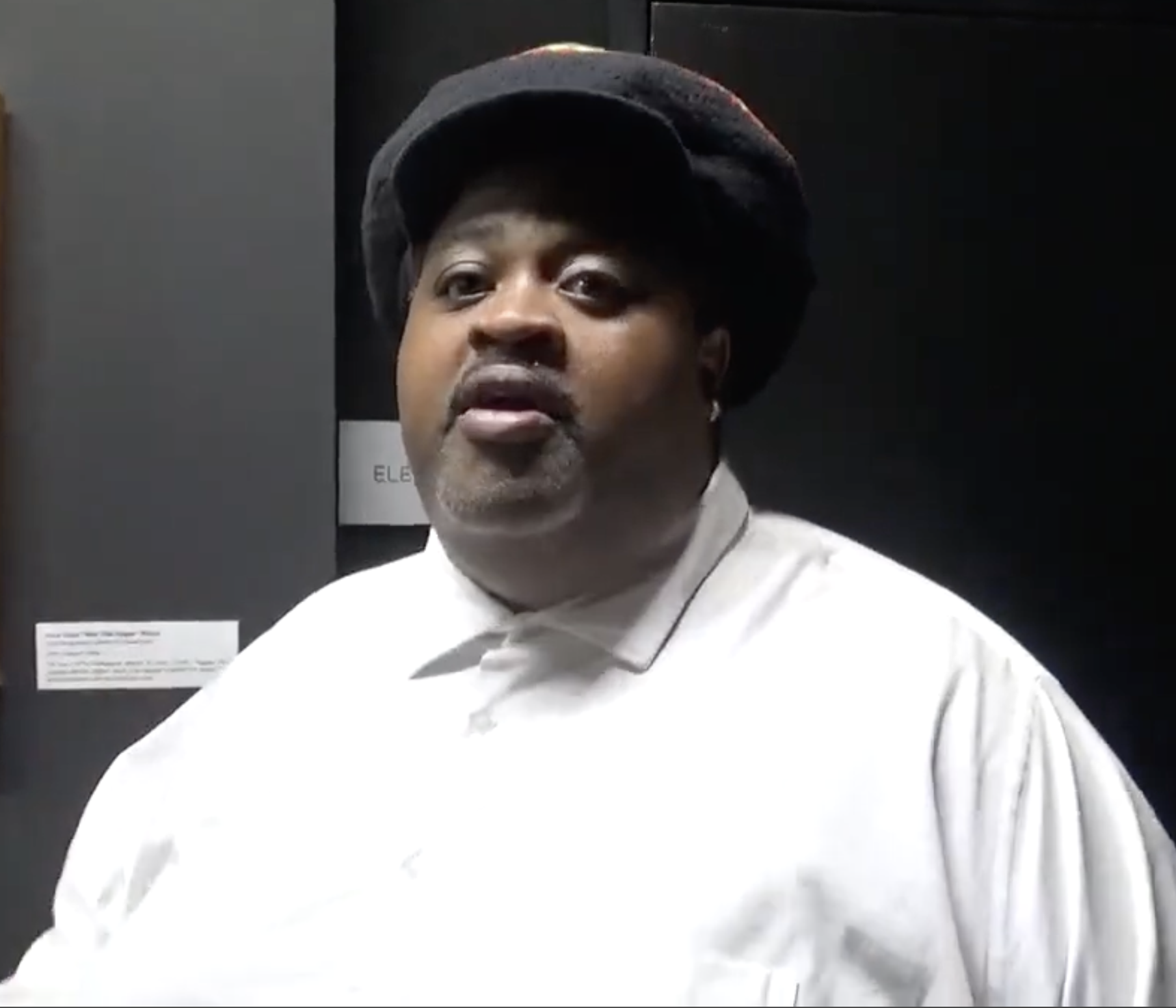
- Lewis in 2025

Background information
- Born: Gamal Kosh Lewis; January 11, 1988 (age 38); Miami, Florida, U.S.
- Genres: R&B; pop
- Occupations: Rapper; singer; songwriter; record producer
- Years active: 2013–present
- Labels: Kemosabe; Columbia

Gamal Kosh Lewis (born January 11, 1988), better known by his stage name LunchMoney Lewis, is an American rapper, singer, songwriter, and record producer. He is best known for his 2015 single "Bills", which topped the charts in Australia and peaked within the top 10 in New Zealand and the United Kingdom. His debut extended play (EP) of the same name includes the song, along with the single "Mama", which entered charts in New Zealand. His second EP, Songs in the Key of Quarantine (2020). He is also known for his guest appearance alongside Flo Rida on Pitbull's 2017 single "Greenlight", which received platinum certification by the Recording Industry Association of America (RIAA).

Outside of performing, he has closely collaborated with record producer Dr. Luke to write songs for other artists; his credits include Lil Durk's "All My Life", which peaked at number two on the Billboard Hot 100, and Nicki Minaj's "Super Freaky Girl", which topped the chart. He has also written for acts such as One Direction, Meghan Trainor, Katy Perry, Fifth Harmony, Jennifer Lopez, XXXTentacion, Lil Wayne, Ariana Grande, J Balvin, Snoop Dogg, Maroon 5, Trey Songz, Jessie J, Becky G, Ciara, Ty Dolla Sign, ASAP Rocky, Big Boi, Doja Cat, alongside others.

== Early life ==
Gamal Kosh Lewis was born in Miami, Florida, on January 11, 1988. His father, Ian Lewis, and uncle, Roger Lewis, are both members of the Jamaican reggae group Inner Circle (known for their signature hit, "Bad Boys") and have a recording studio, Circle House, where artists including Flo Rida and Lil Wayne have recorded. While a teenager, Lewis was given the nickname "LunchMoney", and he was later discovered by American hip hop producer Salaam Remi.

== Career ==
=== 2014–2015: "Bills" and breakout ===
Lewis signed with Dr. Luke's production company Prescription Songs and started working with him as a producer. He first broke into wide recognition as a rapper after appearing on the song "Trini Dem Girls" from Nicki Minaj's 2014 album The Pinkprint. He also co-wrote Jessie J's single "Burnin' Up" from her album Sweet Talker, and Fifth Harmony's single "Boss" from the album Reflection. In 2015, he released his debut single as a solo artist, "Bills", which peaked at 79 on the Billboard Hot 100 and peaked at number one on the ARIA Charts.

In April 2015, Lewis released a garage rock and funk track titled "Real Thing", which is included on the Bills EP released on April 21. He was also featured on Young Money Yawn's song "Let's Go See Papi", also featuring Pusha T.

=== 2015–present ===
After the success of the Bills EP, Lewis was inspired to go back into the studio and started to write more music. In August 2015, his first single outside of the Bills EP project, entitled "Whip It!", featuring vocals from Chloe Angelides, was released. It later was accompanied by a music video which was released on September 15, 2015.

Then, in December 2015, he released another single, entitled "Ain't Too Cool". The song later featured in the 2015 video game Madden NFL 16. This sparked much interest on Lewis writing up his debut album.

Coming into 2016, Lewis took part in many collaborations. He featured vocals in Yo Gotti's 2016 single "Again" and collaborated alongside Meghan Trainor on her promotional single "I Love Me" from her 2016 album Thank You.

In April 2017, Lewis joined Pitbull and Flo Rida in performing "Greenlight" at WrestleMania 33.

On June 9, 2017, Lewis featured on Andy Grammer's new single titled "Give Love".

In August 2022, Lewis got his first chart-topper in the United States as a songwriter, due to his credit on Minaj's "Super Freaky Girl".

== Discography ==
=== Extended plays ===
Title	Details
Bills	Released: April 21, 2015; Format: Digital download; Label: Kemosabe
Songs in the Key of Quarantine	Released: April 10, 2020; Format: Digital download; Label: Lunchbox Records

=== Singles ===
==== As lead artist ====
Title	Year	Peak chart positions									Certifications	Album
Title	Year	US	AUS	AUT	CAN	GER	NLD	NZ	SWI	UK	Certifications	Album
"Bills"	2015	79	1	7	71	15	14	6	44	2	RIAA: Gold; ARIA: 3× Platinum; BPI: Platinum; BVMI: Gold; IFPI AUT: Gold; RMNZ: Gold	Bills
"Whip It!" (featuring Chloe Angelides)	2015	—	11	72	—	23	—	— (Note: "Whip It!" did not enter the NZ Top 40 Singles Chart, but peaked at number six on the NZ Heatseekers chart.)	—	168	ARIA: 2× Platinum; BVMI: Gold	Non-album singles
"Ain't Too Cool"	2015	—	—	—	—	—	—	—	—	—		Non-album singles
"H.O.E. (Heaven On Earth)" (featuring Ty Dolla Sign)	2017	—	—	—	—	—	—	—	—	—		Non-album singles
"Donald"	2017	—	—	—	—	—	—	—	—	—		Non-album singles
"Who's Up?"	2018	—	—	—	—	—	—	—	—	—		Non-album singles
"Make That Cake" (featuring Doja Cat)	2019	—	—	—	—	—	—	—	—	—		Non-album singles
"Pony" (featuring City Girls)	2019	—	—	—	—	—	—	—	—	—		Non-album singles
"Cheat"	2020	—	—	—	—	—	—	—	—	—		Non-album singles
"Money Dance"	2021	—	—	—	—	—	—	—	—	—		Non-album singles
"Ocean" (featuring Meghan Trainor)	2021	—	—	—	—	—	—	—	—	—		Non-album singles
"Don't Stop" (featuring Trinidad James)	2021	—	—	—	—	—	—	—	—	—		Non-album singles
"—" denotes a single that did not chart or was not released in that territory.

==== As featured artist ====
Title	Year	Peak chart positions				Certifications	Album
Title	Year	US	AUS	CAN	UK	Certifications	Album
"Greenlight" (Pitbull featuring Flo Rida and LunchMoney Lewis)	2016	95	—	79	—	RIAA: Platinum; MC: Gold	Climate Change
"Money Maker" (Throttle featuring LunchMoney Lewis and Aston Merrygold)	2016	—	65	—	—		Non-album single
"What Happened to Love" (Wyclef Jean featuring LunchMoney Lewis and The Knocks)	2017	—	—	—	—		Carnival III: The Fall and Rise of a Refugee
"All Night" (Big Boi featuring LunchMoney Lewis)	2017	— (Note: "All Night" did not enter the Billboard Hot 100, but peaked at number 16 on the Billboard Bubbling Under Hot 100 Singles chart.)	—	—	76	SNEP: Platinum; RIAA: Gold	Boomiverse
"Give Love" (Andy Grammer featuring LunchMoney Lewis)	2017	—	—	—	—		The Good Parts
"Ridiculous" (Kyrie Irving featuring LunchMoney Lewis)	2018	—	—	—	—		Uncle Drew (Original Motion Picture Soundtrack)
"—" denotes a single that did not chart or was not released in that territory.

=== Other charted songs ===
Year	Title	Peak chart positions		Album
Year	Title	US Pop Dig.	US R&B Bub.	Album
2015	"Trini Dem Girls" (Nicki Minaj featuring LunchMoney Lewis)	—	1	The Pinkprint
2015	"Mama"	41	—	Bills
"—" denotes a song that did not chart.

=== Guest appearances ===
Title	Year	Other artist(s)	Album
"I Feel Good"	2015	Thomas Rhett	Tangled Up
"Drag Me Down" (Big Payno x AFTERHRS Remix)	2015	One Direction	Perfect EP
"Favorite"	2016	Travis Mills, K Camp and Ty Dolla Sign	While You Wait EP
"I Love Me"	2016	Meghan Trainor	Thank You
"Lifestyle"	2016	Yo Gotti	White Friday (CM9)
"Who I Am"	2017	Maroon 5	Red Pill Blues

=== Songwriting credits ===
List of songs written or co-written for other artists
Title	Year	Artist	Album
"Scholarship" (featuring ASAP Rocky)	2013	Juicy J	Stay Trippy
"Boss"	2014	Fifth Harmony	Reflection
"Burnin' Up" (featuring 2 Chainz)	2014	Jessie J	Sweet Talker
"Stand Up"	2014	Chris Webby	Chemically Imbalanced
"Jackie (B.M.F.)"	2015	Ciara	Jackie
"Lullaby"	2015	Ciara	Jackie
"Give Me Love"	2015	Ciara	Jackie
"First Time"	2015	Icona Pop	Emergency EP
"Break a Sweat"	2015	Becky G	Non-album single
"Not Too Young"	2015	Sabina Ddumba	Homeward Bound
"Make Up" (featuring Chloe Angelides)	2015	R. City	What Dreams Are Made Of
"End of the Day"	2015	One Direction	Made in the A.M.
"Marching Band" (featuring Juicy J)	2015	R. Kelly	The Buffet
"Ain't Your Mama"	2016	Jennifer Lopez	Non-album single
"Watch Me Do"	2016	Meghan Trainor	Thank You
"I Love Me" (with LunchMoney Lewis)	2016	Meghan Trainor	Thank You
"I Won't Let You Down"	2016	Meghan Trainor	Thank You
"Goosebumps"	2016	Meghan Trainor	Thank You
"Greenlight" (featuring LunchMoney Lewis and Flo Rida)	2016	Pitbull	Climate Change
"Be the 1"	2017	Ricky Reed	Non-album single
"So Good" (featuring Ty Dolla Sign)	2017	Zara Larsson	So Good
"Swalla" (featuring Nicki Minaj and Ty Dolla Sign)	2017	Jason Derulo	Nu King
"Under Your Skin" (with R. City)	2017	Seeb	Non-album single
"Todo Cambió"	2017	Becky G	Non-album single
"Priceless"	2017	Trey Songz	Tremaine the Album
"Give Love" (featuring LunchMoney Lewis)	2017	Andy Grammer	The Good Parts
"All Night"	2017	Big Boi	Boomiverse
"What Happened to Love" (featuring LunchMoney Lewis and The Knocks)	2017	Wyclef Jean	Carnival III: The Fall and Rise of a Refugee
"Buzzin'"	2017	Alina Baraz	Non-album single
"Save It for You" (featuring Chris Brown)	2017	Yo Gotti	I Still Am
"Who I Am" (featuring LunchMoney Lewis)	2017	Maroon 5	Red Pill Blues
"I Don't Care" (featuring LunchMoney Lewis)	2018	Snoop Dogg	220 EP
"Bandz" (featuring LunchMoney Lewis and Yo Gotti)	2018	Blac Youngsta	2.23
"Preacher Man"	2018	The Driver Era	Non-album single
"Familiar" (with J Balvin)	2018	Liam Payne	Non-album single
"Must've Been" (featuring DRAM)	2018	Chromeo	Head Over Heels
"Unless It's With You"	2018	Christina Aguilera	Liberation
"Bed" (featuring Ariana Grande)	2018	Nicki Minaj	Queen
"Don't Cry" (featuring XXXTentacion)	2018	Lil Wayne	Tha Carter V
"Can't Be Broken"	2018	Lil Wayne	Tha Carter V
"Nobody Else"	2019	Backstreet Boys	DNA
"Foolish"	2019	Meghan Trainor	The Love Train
"Birthday Party"	2021	NCT U	Universe
“Super Freaky Girl”	2022	Nicki Minaj	Pink Friday 2
“Lifetimes”	2024	Katy Perry	143
"Gyro-Drop"	2025	G-Dragon	Übermensch
