= Slow Roast Records =

American independent record label

- Founded: 2009
- Founder: DJ Craze; Kill The Noise
- Genre: Electronic
- Location: Miami, Florida
- Official website: slowroastrecs.com

Slow Roast Records is an independent record label based out of Miami, Florida, US.

== History ==
Slow Roast Records was founded in 2009 by the 3x DMC World Champion DJ Craze and Kill the Noise. The Miami New Times acknowledges the record label's starting to make big waves in the independent scene in recent years saying, "After a couple of years of carefully cooking up the right beats, choosing the right artists, and prepping the right releases, Craze, Kill the Noise, and their genre-bending label hit it hard in 2013." Until recently, Slow Roast was distributed by their good friends at Fool's Gold Records.

== Founders ==
Craze was born in Nicaragua and grew up in Miami where he currently resides. He is known as one of the most accomplished turntablists of all time, having won over a dozen competition titles including a record three consecutive World DMC Championships. Craze also placed second in the 1999 DMC World Team Championships with his group The Allies (alongside fellow DMC World Champions A-Trak and Infamous) who took home the Team Championship the following year. Kill The Noise, also known as Jake Stanczak or Ewun, is an electronic music producer from Rochester, NY currently living and working in Los Angeles, CA. After gaining critical success with his Ewun project, Jake Stanczak delved into the spacier dubstep realm to create Kill The Noise. Since, he has worked with Deadmau5's label Mau5trap and collaborated with Skrillex on four tracks: "Right on Time" and "Burst" with 12th Planet, "Narcissistic Cannibal" with Korn and "Recess" with Fatman Scoop and Michael Angelakos.

== Roster ==
- Ape Drums
- Brillz
- Codes
- DJ Craze
- Kill The Noise
- DJ Klever

== Discography ==
Slow Roast Records Discography
Year	Artist	Title	Catalogue
2010	Kill The Noise	Roots EP	SR001
2010	Senor Stereo	Unintentional EP	SR002
2010	Klever	It Gets Hot EP	SR003
2011	Senor Stereo	Unintentional EP - The Remixes	SR004
2011	Codes	Codes House EP	SR005
2011	Craze	Dance Alone	SR006
2011	Codes	Codes House Remix EP	SR007
2012	Kill The Noise	Roots Remixed EP	SR008
2012	Craze	Selekta EP	SR009
2012	Codes & Craze	Deeper	SR010
2013	Codes	The Get Down EP	SR011
2013	Brillz	TWONK LP	SR012
2013	Brillz	RETWONKED	SR013
2014	Ape Drums	Bashment	SR014
2014	J. Rabbit	Peyote Soda EP	SR015
2014	SuddenBeatz feat. Craze	Bring it Back Now	SR016
2014	Astronomar	Leather Gloves	SR017
2014	Codes	Brooklyn Bounce LP	SR018
