= Messin' Around (Pitbull song) =

Single by Pitbull featuring Enrique Iglesias

from the album Climate Change
- Released: April 8, 2016
- Recorded: 2016
- Genre: Pop; trap
- Length: 3:43
- Label: RCA; Polo Grounds; Mr. 305
- Songwriters: Armando C. Pérez; Enrique Iglesias; Jose Garcia; Jorge Gomez; AJ Junior; Jimmy Thornfeldt; Michael Calderon; Gary Richrath
- Producers: Jimmy Joker; Gomez; IAMCHINO; AJ Junior

Pitbull singles chronology
"Drive You Crazy" (2015)	"Messin' Around" (2016)	"Greenlight" (2016)

Enrique Iglesias singles chronology
"Noche y De Día" (2015)	"Messin' Around" (2016)	"Duele el Corazón" (2016)

Music video
- "Messin' Around" on YouTube

"Messin' Around" is a song by American rapper and singer Pitbull, featuring vocals from Spanish singer Enrique Iglesias. It was released on April 8, 2016, as the lead single of Pitbull's tenth studio album, Climate Change. The song interpolates "Take It on the Run" by REO Speedwagon. It also recycles a verse by Pitbull from the song "Kiss from Those Lips" by Pitbull and Qwote.

== Music video ==
On May 25, 2016, Pitbull uploaded the music video for "Messin' Around" on his YouTube and Vevo account.

== Track listing ==
- Digital download
1. "Messin' Around" (featuring Enrique Iglesias) — 3:43

== Live performances ==
Pitbull sang the track for the first time on television on May 24, 2016, during the Dancing with the Stars season finale on an outdoor stage.

Pitbull performed the song live with REO Speedwagon on the TV series Greatest Hits in 2016. That version of the song was also released as a single on iTunes.

He also performed the song at the 2016 CMT Music Awards with English singer Leona Lewis and The Voice winner Cassadee Pope.

== Charts ==
=== Weekly charts ===
Chart (2016)	Peak position
Canada Hot 100 (Billboard)	51
Canada CHR/Top 40 (Billboard)	37
Canada Hot AC (Billboard)	50
Mexico (Billboard Mexican Airplay)	33
Mexico (Billboard Ingles Airplay)	12
Netherlands (Single Top 100)	74
Romania (Airplay 100)	74
Slovakia Airplay (ČNS IFPI)	16
Spain (Promusicae)	49
US Billboard Hot 100	64
US Dance Club Songs (Billboard)	10
US Hot Rap Songs (Billboard)	15
US Pop Airplay (Billboard)	25
US Rhythmic Airplay (Billboard)	37

== Certifications ==
Region	Certification	Certified units/sales
United States (RIAA)	Platinum	1,000,000^{‡}
^{‡} Sales+streaming figures based on certification alone.
