= All Night (Big Boi song) =

Single by Big Boi featuring LunchMoney Lewis

from the album Boomiverse
- Released: July 17, 2017
- Recorded: 2016–2017
- Genre: Pop, pop rap
- Length: 4:01
- Label: Epic
- Songwriters: Patton; Lukasz Gottwald; Henry Walter; Griffin Oskar; Chloe Angelides; Aaron Jennings; Gamal Lewis
- Producers: Dr. Luke; Cirkut; Griffin Oskar

Big Boi singles chronology
"Kill Jill" (2017)	"All Night" (2017)	"Doin' It" (2019)

LunchMoney Lewis singles chronology
"What Happened To Love" (2017)	"All Night" (2017)	"Give Love" (2017)

"All Night" is the third single by American rapper Big Boi for his third studio album, Boomiverse. It was released as a single on July 17, 2017. The song features guest vocals from American rapper Lunchmoney Lewis. It charted on the Billboard Bubbling Under Hot 100 chart at No. 16. The song is his highest charting single as a solo artist. It also charted internationally in the UK, France, and Japan. The song is played in the key of C♭ major, and in common time at 136 beats per minute.

== Background ==
"All Night" is a song about letting the girl choose what she wants to do. The song was featured in an iPhone X commercial in November 2017. The Guardian saw the song as "simultaneously too wacky and too obvious" and "a moment to cringe at, but for the most part this is dad rap that can hold its head high."

== Music video ==
A music video for the single "All Night" was released on June 1, 2018. The visual features Big Boi helping a man set up for a date night.

== Charts ==
=== Weekly charts ===
Chart (2018)	Peak position
France (SNEP)	34
Japan (Japan Hot 100)	88
UK Singles (Official Charts)	76
US Bubbling Under Hot 100 (Billboard)	16
US Bubbling Under R&B/Hip-Hop Singles (Billboard)	3
US Pop Airplay (Billboard)	30
US Rhythmic Airplay (Billboard)	10

=== Year-end charts ===
Chart (2018)	Position
France (SNEP)	127
US Rhythmic (Billboard)	44

== Certifications ==
Region	Certification	Certified units/sales
France (SNEP)	Platinum	200,000^{‡}
United States (RIAA)	Gold	500,000^{‡}
^{‡} Sales+streaming figures based on certification alone.
