= Greenlight (Pitbull song) =

Single by Pitbull featuring Flo Rida and LunchMoney Lewis

from the album Climate Change
- Released: July 22, 2016
- Genre: Pop rap
- Length: 4:04
- Label: RCA; Polo Grounds; Mr. 305
- Songwriters: Armando Pérez; Lukasz Gottwald; Henry Walter; Tramar Dillard; Gamal Lewis
- Producers: Dr. Luke; Cirkut

Pitbull singles chronology
| "Messin' Around" (2016) | "Greenlight" (2016) | "Can't Have" (2016) |

Flo Rida singles chronology
| "Hello Friday" (2016) | "Greenlight" (2016) | "Zillionaire" (2016) |

LunchMoney Lewis singles chronology
| "Ain't Too Cool" (2015) | "Greenlight" (2016) | "Money Maker" (2016) |

Music video
- "Greenlight" on YouTube

"Greenlight" is a song by American rapper Pitbull featuring fellow American rappers Flo Rida and LunchMoney Lewis. It was released for digital download on July 22, 2016, as the second single of Pitbull's tenth studio album Climate Change, through RCA Records, Polo Grounds Music, and Mr. 305 Inc. The song was written by the artists alongside producers Dr. Luke and Cirkut.

== Music video ==
On August 19, 2016, Pitbull uploaded the music video for "Greenlight" via YouTube. The video was filmed in Miami.

The Bugatti Veyron Limousine with gull wing door featured in the "Greenlight" music video, a retrofitted Lincoln with a Ford 4.6L V8 engine, was placed on auction in January 2023 via Mecum Auctions in Kissimmee, FL. The vehicle sold for $72,000 with a 10% buyer's premium, bringing the final selling price to $79,200.

== Other media ==
The song was chosen as a theme song for WWE's WrestleMania 33.

Following the release of the song, RCA Records and Sony Music released a one-track promotional CD for "Greenlight".

The song can be heard in the season 2 (episode 12) of the TV series Lucifer during a party.

The song is also the walk-on theme for darts player and two-time darts world champion Luke Littler.

== Charts ==
| Chart (2016–2024) | Peak position |
|---|---|
| Belgium (Ultratip Bubbling Under Wallonia) | 27 |
| Brazil Hot 100 Airplay (Billboard Brasil) | 88 |
| Canada (Canadian Hot 100) | 77 |
| Canada CHR/Top 40 (Billboard) | 40 |
| Czech Republic Airplay (ČNS IFPI) | 20 |
| France (SNEP) | 65 |
| Germany (GfK) | 90 |
| Ireland (IRMA) | 17 |
| Mexico (Billboard Mexican Airplay) | 48 |
| Scotland Singles (Official Charts) | 75 |
| Slovakia Airplay (ČNS IFPI) | 56 |
| US Billboard Hot 100 | 95 |
| US Hot Rap Songs (Billboard) | 24 |
| US Pop Airplay (Billboard) | 22 |

== Certifications ==
| Region | Certification | Certified units/sales |
|---|---|---|
| Canada (Music Canada) | Gold | 40,000^{‡} |
| United Kingdom (BPI) | Silver | 200,000^{‡} |
| United States (RIAA) | Platinum | 1,000,000^{‡} |
^{‡} Sales+streaming figures based on certification alone.
