= DJ Craze =

Nicaraguan DJ and record producer

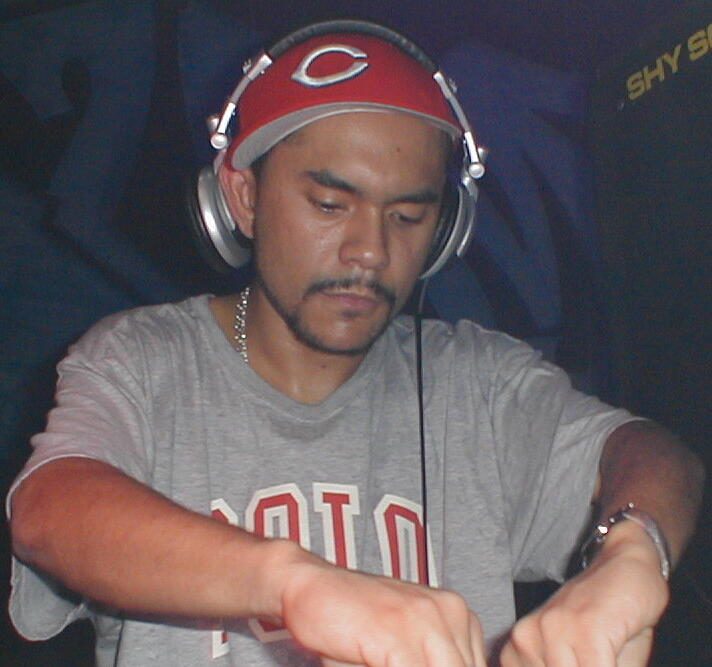
- DJ Craze in 2002

Background information
- Born: Arist Delgado; November 19, 1977 (age 48); Managua, Nicaragua
- Origin: Miami, Florida, United States
- Genres: Hip hop, Miami bass, dubstep, drum and bass, trap
- Occupations: DJ, record producer
- Instruments: Sampler, turntables Denon S9 Mixer & Effects
- Years active: 1995–present
- Labels: Cartel Records, Slow Roast Records, Om Records
- Website: www.djcraze.com

DJ Craze (born Arist Delgado; November 19, 1977) is a Nicaraguan American DJ and record producer who plays hip hop, Miami bass, trap, breaks, dubstep, drum and bass, and practices turntablism. He was, until 2020, the only solo DJ in history to win the DMC World DJ Championships trophy three times consecutively (1998–2000).

== Biography ==
DJ Craze was born in Managua, Nicaragua. At the age of 3, in 1980, he fled the country with his family during the war which lasted throughout the 1980s. Craze and his family moved to San Francisco, California, where they lived for a short while, before moving to Miami, Florida, where he currently resides.

The style of his music carries many of his past musical influences. Initially influenced by the Miami Bass movement when he was younger, Craze has gone on to incorporate elements of hip-hop, drum n bass, and breaks in his turntable routines. Recently, Craze has shifted his emphasis to DJing and producing drum n bass with his own record label "Cartel".

Craze released his first album in 1999, Crazee Musick, and a second in 2002, Scratch Nerds. He also released an album called D-Day in 2002 with his turntable crew, the Allies.

Craze has released two of the most popular battle records ever, "Bully Breaks" and "Bully Breaks 2".

Craze was Kanye West's DJ for his Glow in the Dark tour in 2008 while A-Trak worked on his Fool's Gold record label and tour.

Craze was featured on the Native-Instruments website demonstrating the Traktor X1 Controller.

Recently, Craze created his own record label with fellow DJ and friend Kill The Noise, Slow Roast Records. Slow Roast is distributed by Fool's Gold, the record label shared by A-Trak and Nick Catchdubs. Other than Craze and Kill The Noise, Klever, Codes, and Senor Stereo also release material under the Slow Roast label.

In February 2011, DJ Craze and DJ Shiftee worked together, spinning on-stage with controllerist and Traktor S4 consultant Ean Golden at Club EVE in downtown Miami for the Midi Fight Club event. Between the two of them, DJ Craze and DJ Shiftee had 7 DMC world championships behind them. The event highlighted the use of Native Instruments controllers, such as the X1, S4 and Maschine.

In September 2011, DJ Craze became Yelawolf's touring DJ as he was featured on the rapper's "Hard White Tour", along with Rittz, however he was replaced in early 2014 by DJ Klever.

DJ Craze worked with THUMP and A-Trak in 2017 to bring DJ Battles in the Goldie Awards. He judged the competition along with other famous DJs like Diplo, Mannie Fresh, The Whooligan, Destructo, Just Blaze, and Mija.

== Championship titles and recognition ==
- Time magazine's "America's Best" DJ - 2001
- World DMC Team Champion - 2001
- World DMC Champion - 2000
- World DMC Champion - 1999
- Winter Music Conference Scratch Off Champion - 1999
- World DMC Champion - 1998
- USA DMC Champion - 1998
- World ITF Scratch Off Champion - 1998
- ITF Western Hemisphere Scratch Off Champion - 1998
- Winter Music Conference Scratch Off Champion - 1998
- Winter Music Conference Scratch Off Champion - 1997
- East Coast DMC Champion - 1997
- Winter Music Conference Scratch Off Champion - 1996
- East Coast Rap Sheet Champion - 1996
- Zulu National Champion - 1996
- Zulu National Champion - 1995

== Discography ==
=== Albums ===
- Crazee Musick (1999)
- United DJs of America, Vol. 16: The Nexxsound (2000)
- Scratch Nerds (2002)
- D-Day (with The Allies) (2002)
- Adam F: Drum and Bass Warfare (CD2 mixed by DJ Craze) (2002)
- Live in Puerto Rico: Hip Hop Drum N Bass Turntablism (2003)
- Rugged Radio Saturday (2003)
- Miami Heat (2005)
- FabricLive.38 (February 2008)
