= Boomiverse =

Studio album by Big Boi
- Released: June 16, 2017
- Recorded: 2016–2017
- Genre: Hip-hop
- Length: 45:23
- Labels: Purple Ribbon; Epic
- Producers: Big Boi; Organized Noize; Beat Butcha; Cory Mo; Cirkut; Diego Ave; DJ Dahi; DJ Khalil; Dr. Luke; Griffin Oskar; Ian Kirkpatrick; Jake Troth; Mannie Fresh; Scott Storch; Siege Monstrosity; TM88; Young Cali of The Inkkwell

Big Boi chronology
Big Grams (2015)	Boomiverse (2017)	The Big Sleepover (2021)

Singles from Boomiverse
- 1. "Mic Jack" Released: April 21, 2017; 2. "Kill Jill" Released: April 21, 2017; 3. "All Night" Released: July 17, 2017

Boomiverse is the third studio album by American rapper Big Boi. The album was released on June 16, 2017, by Epic Records . The album features guest appearances from Adam Levine, Jeezy, Killer Mike, Gucci Mane, and Curren$y. It contains production from frequent collaborators Organized Noise, DJ Dahi, Dr. Luke, and Scott Storch, among others. It was supported by the release of three singles – "Mic Jack" featuring Adam Levine, Scar and Sleepy Brown, "Kill Jill" featuring Killer Mike and Jeezy, and "All Night". The latter is Big Boi's highest charting single as a lead artist. Boomiverse was later reissued under Concord Music Group by way of their reissue label, Craft Recordings.

== Background ==
After the release of Big Grams (2015), a collaborative extended play (EP) from rapper Big Boi and rock band Phantogram, Big Boi began writing for his upcoming third solo studio album. He cited influences on the album which included Kate Bush and A Tribe Called Quest. On April 19, 2017, he revealed the title for the album and released the first two singles, "Mic Jack" featuring Adam Levine of Maroon 5, Scar and Sleepy Brown and "Kill Jill" featuring Jeezy and Killer Mike of Run the Jewels two days later.

On May 16, 2017, he revealed that Boomiverse was scheduled for release on June 16, 2017, and includes guest appearances from Gucci Mane, Janelle Monáe, among others. A music video for "Kill Jill" was released on June 2, 2017.

The song "All Night" was featured in an iPhone X commercial in November 2017.

== Critical reception ==
Professional ratings
Aggregate scores
Source	Rating
Metacritic	70/100
Review scores
Source	Rating
AllMusic	3.5/5 stars
Clash Magazine	7/10
Courier Journal	3.5/4 stars
Exclaim!	8/10
The Guardian	4/5 stars
Paste Magazine	8.4/10
Pitchfork	7.4/10

Boomiverse received positive reviews from critics. At Metacritic, which assigns a normalized rating out of 100 to reviews from mainstream critics, the album received an average score of 70, based on 13 reviews. Jayson Greene of Pitchfork commented: "Boomiverse doesn't have the same freewheeling, blitzkrieg energy as Sir Lucious, but it reestablishes Big Boi as a dependable record maker who will always make music worth checking for, no matter what else is going on around him. He's not really in a position to be competing against Migos on rap radio, and he doesn't want to, at all." Alex Macpherson of The Guardian stated: "A sprinkling of electro bleeps throws Boomiverse back to the 1980s and on irresistible highlight Chocolate, Big Boi morphs into Missy Elliott in her house-dabbling phase. He's careful to drop a Future reference here and borrow Kendrick Lamar's cadence there to root it in the present, but Boomiverse's self-conscious stylistic plurality is the new old-school. "All Night", simultaneously too wacky and too obvious, is a moment to cringe at, but for the most part this is dad rap that can hold its head high."

Nastia Voynovskaya of Paste Magazine commented: "Boomiverse is an exuberant record that dabbles in different subgenres of hip-hop to emerge with a crisp, cohesive final product that stays true to Big Boi's roots while cultivating an up-to-date sound. With Outkast collaborators Organized Noize handling the majority of the album's production, Boomiverse is steeped in the classic Southern sound that predated what we know as trap music today. The album is far from the work of a legend resting on his laurels; instead, its inventive and genuinely fun sound makes a compelling case for why, 20 years after his debut, we should still be paying attention to Big Boi."

Will Lavin of Clash Magazine praised Big Boi's lyricism and production style: "Laced with complex rhyme styles and diverse lyrical content Boomiverse is a welcomed return for Daddy Fat Sack. Walking a thin line between pretty much every musical genre known to mankind, don't be surprised when on Boomiverse one minute you’re breaking your neck on a bed of 808s, electro drum patterns and screaming synths and the next you're kicking back to a selection of funky rhythms, sax solos and acoustic guitars."

Exclaim! critic Erin Lowers commented that "Big Boi continues to reinvent himself, and the Boomiverse signifies something of a new start. And while new beginnings aren't without their flaws, Big Boi's lyrical prowess and effortless delivery provide the thread that link the old Big Boi universe to this, the Boomiverse."

== Track listing ==
Boomiverse track listing
No.	Title	Writer(s)	Producer(s)	Length
1.	"Da Next Day" (featuring Big Rube)	Antwan Patton; Ray Murray; Ruben Bailey	Organized Noize	2:33
2.	"Kill Jill" (featuring Killer Mike and Jeezy)	Patton; Murray; Kristopher Bailey; Tobias Thomas; Aura Qualic; Shelton Oliver; Milton Poole III; Sarah Johnson; Masspike Miles; Hollis Mason; Michael Render; Jay Jenkins	Organized Noize; Young Cali; Big Boi	4:24
3.	"Mic Jack" (featuring Adam Levine, Scar and Sleepy Brown)	Patton; Dacoury Natche; Khalil Abdul-Rahman; Zion Brown; Zoe Brown; Malik Brown; Makari Brown; Patrick Brown; Taylor Parks; Terrence Smith	DJ Dahi; DJ Khalil	3:22
4.	"In the South" (featuring Gucci Mane and Pimp C)	Patton; Cory Moore; Bryan Simmons; Carolyn Walters; Radric Davis; Chadron Butler	Cory Mo; TM88; Organized Noize	4:05
5.	"Order of Operations"	Patton; Eric Bellinger; Scott Storch; Diego Avendaño	Scott Storch; Diego Ave^{[a]}	3:39
6.	"All Night" (featuring LunchMoney Lewis)	Patton; Lukasz Gottwald; Henry Walter; Griffin Oskar; Chloe Angelides; Aaron Jennings; Gamal Lewis	Dr. Luke; Cirkut; Griffin Oskar	4:01
7.	"Get Wit It" (featuring Snoop Dogg)	Patton; Murray; Oliver; Calvin Broadus	Organized Noize	4:39
8.	"Overthunk" (featuring Eric Bellinger)	Patton; Murray; Rico Wade; P. Brown	Organized Noize	3:27
9.	"Chocolate" (featuring Trozé)	Patton; Jacob Troth	Jake Troth	3:01
10.	"Made Man" (featuring Killer Mike and Kurupt)	Patton; Render; Oliver; Eliot Dubock; Marcus White; Ricardo Brown	Beat Butcha; Siege Monstrosity	3:48
11.	"Freakanomics" (featuring Sleepy Brown)	Patton; Murray; Ian Kirkpatrick; Sean Douglas	Ian Kirkpatrick; Big Boi; Organized Noize	4:32
12.	"Follow Deez" (featuring Curren$y and Killer Mike)	Patton; Render; Byron Thomas; Shante Franklin	Mannie Fresh	3:52

Notes

- ^{^[a]} signifies a co-producer
- "Kill Jill" features background vocals from Rock D the Legend and Hatsune Miku.
- "Mic Jack" and "In the South" features background vocals from Miss C.C. LaFlor
- "Order of Operations" features background vocals from Eric Bellinger.
- "Get Wit It" features background vocals from Scar and Miss C.C. LaFlor.
- "Freakanomics" features background vocals from Sleepy Brown, Ian Kirkpatrick, Scar and Sean Douglas.

== Charts ==
Chart performance for Boomiverse
Chart (2017)	Peak position
Canadian Albums (Billboard)	76
New Zealand Heatseeker Albums (RMNZ)	7
US Billboard 200	28
US Top R&B/Hip-Hop Albums (Billboard)	12
