= WrestleMania 33 =

2017 WWE pay-per-view and livestreaming event

- Promotional poster featuring various WWE wrestlers
- Promotion: WWE
- Brand(s): Raw; SmackDown
- Date: April 2, 2017
- City: Orlando, Florida
- Venue: Camping World Stadium
- Attendance: 64,900
- Tagline: "The Ultimate Thrill Ride"

WWE event chronology
← Previous; NXT TakeOver: Orlando	Next → Payback

WrestleMania chronology
← Previous; 32	Next → 34

WrestleMania 33 was a 2017 professional wrestling pay-per-view (PPV) and livestreaming event produced by WWE, held for wrestlers from the promotion's main roster brands, Raw and SmackDown. It was the 33rd annual WrestleMania and took place on April 2, 2017, at Camping World Stadium in Orlando, Florida. Then-active WWE wrestlers The New Day (Big E, Kofi Kingston, and Xavier Woods) served as the hosts of the event.

Thirteen matches were contested at the event, including three on the Kickoff pre-show. In the main event, Roman Reigns defeated The Undertaker in a No Holds Barred match, giving Undertaker his second loss at WrestleMania. While the loss and the events immediately following the main event seemingly insinuated that Undertaker had retired, he would return to in-ring competition in 2018 at WrestleMania 34. In the main match from SmackDown, Randy Orton defeated Bray Wyatt to win his ninth WWE Championship. In the main match for Raw, Brock Lesnar defeated Goldberg to win the Universal Championship, thus becoming the first wrestler to win both the WWE and Universal titles. This was also Goldberg's first WrestleMania match since WrestleMania XX in 2004. The event also marked the surprise return of The Hardy Boyz (Jeff Hardy and Matt Hardy), who won the Raw Tag Team Championship in a four-team ladder match.

This was the third WrestleMania held in the U.S. state of Florida, after WrestleMania XXIV in 2008, which was at the same venue when it was still known as the Florida Citrus Bowl, and WrestleMania XXVIII in 2012 in Miami Gardens. It was also the first WrestleMania held following the reintroduction of the brand extension in July 2016. As a result, it was the first time since WrestleMania 29 in 2013 in which two men's world championships were contested on the card, and also the first time ever for two women's world championships to be contested. It subsequently marked the first time that the Universal Championship, the SmackDown Women's Championship, and Raw's WWE Cruiserweight Championship were defended at a WrestleMania, with the latter occurring on the pre-show. This was also the first WrestleMania to be on the air past midnight Eastern Time.

Reception towards the event was mixed, although it was largely considered to be an improvement over WrestleMania 32. Praise was directed towards AJ Styles vs. Shane McMahon, Kevin Owens vs. Chris Jericho, the Raw Tag Team Championship ladder match, Seth Rollins vs. Triple H, and the Universal Championship match. Criticism was reserved for the main event, the WWE Championship match, and the overall length of the show, which stretched past the seven-hour mark.

== Production ==
=== Background ===
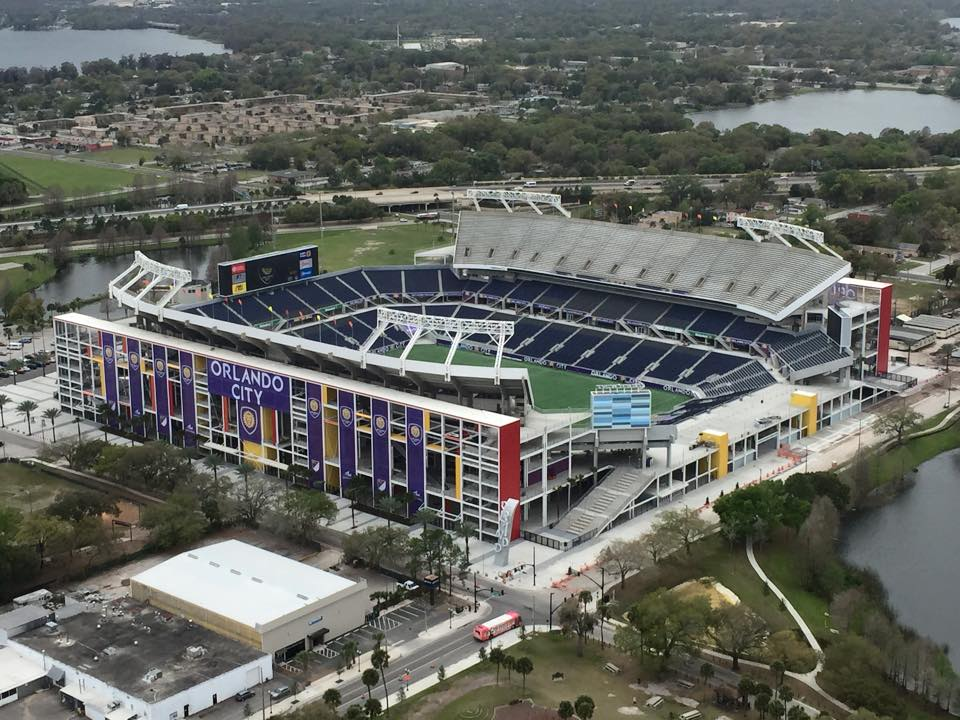
The 33rd annual WrestleMania was the second time for WWE's marquee event to be held at Camping World Stadium in Orlando, Florida, after WrestleMania XXIV in 2008 when the stadium was known as the Florida Citrus Bowl.

WrestleMania is WWE's flagship professional wrestling pay-per-view (PPV) and livestreaming event, having first been held in 1985. It was the company's first pay-per-view produced and was also WWE's first major event available via livestreaming when the company launched the WWE Network in February 2014. It is the longest-running professional wrestling event in history and is held annually between mid-March to mid-April. It was the first of WWE's original four pay-per-views, which includes Royal Rumble, SummerSlam, and Survivor Series, referred to as the "Big Four". The event has been described as the Super Bowl of sports entertainment. Much like the Super Bowl, cities bid for the right to host the year's edition of WrestleMania.

Announced on March 8, 2016, WrestleMania 33 was scheduled to be held on April 2, 2017, at Camping World Stadium in Orlando, Florida. It was the third WrestleMania to be held in the U.S. state of Florida, after WrestleMania XXIV in 2008, which was at the same stadium when it was known as the Florida Citrus Bowl, and WrestleMania XXVIII in 2012, which was in Miami Gardens. Tickets went on sale on November 18, 2016, with individual tickets costing $38 to $2,130. On October 31, 2016, traveling packages with accommodation ranging from $950 to $5,900 per person were sold. A two-hour Kickoff pre-show preceded the main show, with the second hour broadcast simultaneously on USA Network. On February 20, 2017, then-active WWE wrestlers The New Day (Big E, Kofi Kingston, and Xavier Woods) of the Raw brand were confirmed to be the hosts of WrestleMania 33.

This was the first WrestleMania held since the reintroduction of the brand extension in July 2016, in which WWE again divided the main roster between the Raw and SmackDown brands where wrestlers were exclusively assigned to perform. As such, this was the first WrestleMania since WrestleMania 29 in 2013 to include two men's world championship matches, in turn marking the first WrestleMania to feature the Universal Championship, following its introduction on Raw in July 2016 after the WWE World Heavyweight Championship became exclusive to SmackDown and renamed as WWE Championship. It was also the first to include two women's world championship matches, thus being the first WrestleMania to feature the SmackDown Women's Championship, as well as the newer WWE Cruiserweight Championship which occurred on the pre-show.

The four official theme songs for the event were "Greenlight" by Pitbull feat. Flo Rida and LunchMoney Lewis, "Like a Champion" by Danger Twins, "Flame" by Tinashe, and "Am I Savage?" by Metallica. At the event, Pitbull performed "Options" with Stephen Marley before performing "Greenlight" with Flo Rida and LunchMoney Lewis. American singer Tinashe performed "America the Beautiful" to kick off WrestleMania 33. The pre-show was broadcast on the WWE Network, WWE.com, Facebook, Google+, Pinterest, and YouTube, with USA Network joining the live coverage for the second hour.

Beginning at WrestleMania 32, a match between Big Show and National Basketball Association (NBA) star Shaquille O'Neal had been teased from various media outlets, including WWE. Shaq was a surprise entrant in the 2016 André the Giant Memorial Battle Royal where he and Big Show faced off, but the other participants eliminated both of them. In July at the 2016 ESPY Awards on the red carpet, Show and Shaq had another brief confrontation. A match was proposed for WrestleMania 33, which Shaq accepted. In January 2017, the two began calling each other out on social media, posting workout videos of themselves preparing for the potential match. Big Show then began to doubt Shaq's commitment to the match. By the end of February, Shaq said that it looked like the match was not going to happen, but he would still train just in case. The following week, Shaq said that discussions were back on between him and WWE. However, Big Show's announcement as a participant in the 2017 André the Giant Memorial Battle Royal indicated that the match was off. According to Dave Meltzer of Wrestling Observer Newsletter, the match was canceled due to monetary reasons, as both parties could not agree on a deal. Big Show said that he really wanted to do the match, especially since this would probably be his last WrestleMania and blamed Shaq's weight as a reason for why Shaq backed out.

According to wrestling journalist Dave Meltzer in January 2017, a WrestleMania 33 match between The Undertaker and John Cena was scrapped as Vince McMahon had "a different vision for the show and [was] thinking [about the] longterm picture not short-term". Since 2014, WWE had attempted to establish Roman Reigns as their top babyface and the next "face of the company", but a significant portion of fans rejected Reigns in this role, taking issue with his perceived special treatment, real-life demeanor, wrestling moveset, speaking skills, and character presentation. This resulted in Reigns being booed while he wrestled in the main events of WrestleMania 31 and WrestleMania 32. Reigns was even voted as 2016's "Most Hated Wrestler of the Year" by Pro Wrestling Illustrated readers, a first for a heroic character since the award was devised in 1972. In response to the negative reception, Reigns said that there is "possible jealousy" from fans regarding his "major success". In March 2017 before WrestleMania 33, wrestling journalist Dave Meltzer reported that WWE's long term plans ("which obviously could change") leading to WrestleMania 34 was to "once again build for a year and have the big coronation" for Reigns, who would still be a heroic character "between now and then" and beat Brock Lesnar for the Universal Championship "to fully replace John Cena as the lead babyface of the company", while the "idea" for Lesnar's role "for years now" was "to become a monster, be unbeatable, run through everybody, and then lose to Roman Reigns".

=== Storylines ===
The event comprised 13 matches, including three on the Kickoff pre-show, that resulted from scripted storylines. Results were predetermined by WWE's writers on the Raw and SmackDown brands, while storylines were produced on WWE's weekly television shows, Monday Night Raw, SmackDown Live, and the cruiserweight-exclusive 205 Live.

==== Main event match ====
At the Royal Rumble, The Undertaker was eliminated by Roman Reigns in the titular match. In the ensuing stare down, Reigns exclaimed: "This is my yard now!", a claim The Undertaker had made for many years. On the March 6 episode of Raw, The Undertaker attacked Reigns with a chokeslam, and a match between the two was scheduled for WrestleMania 33 in what would become the main event.

==== World championship matches ====
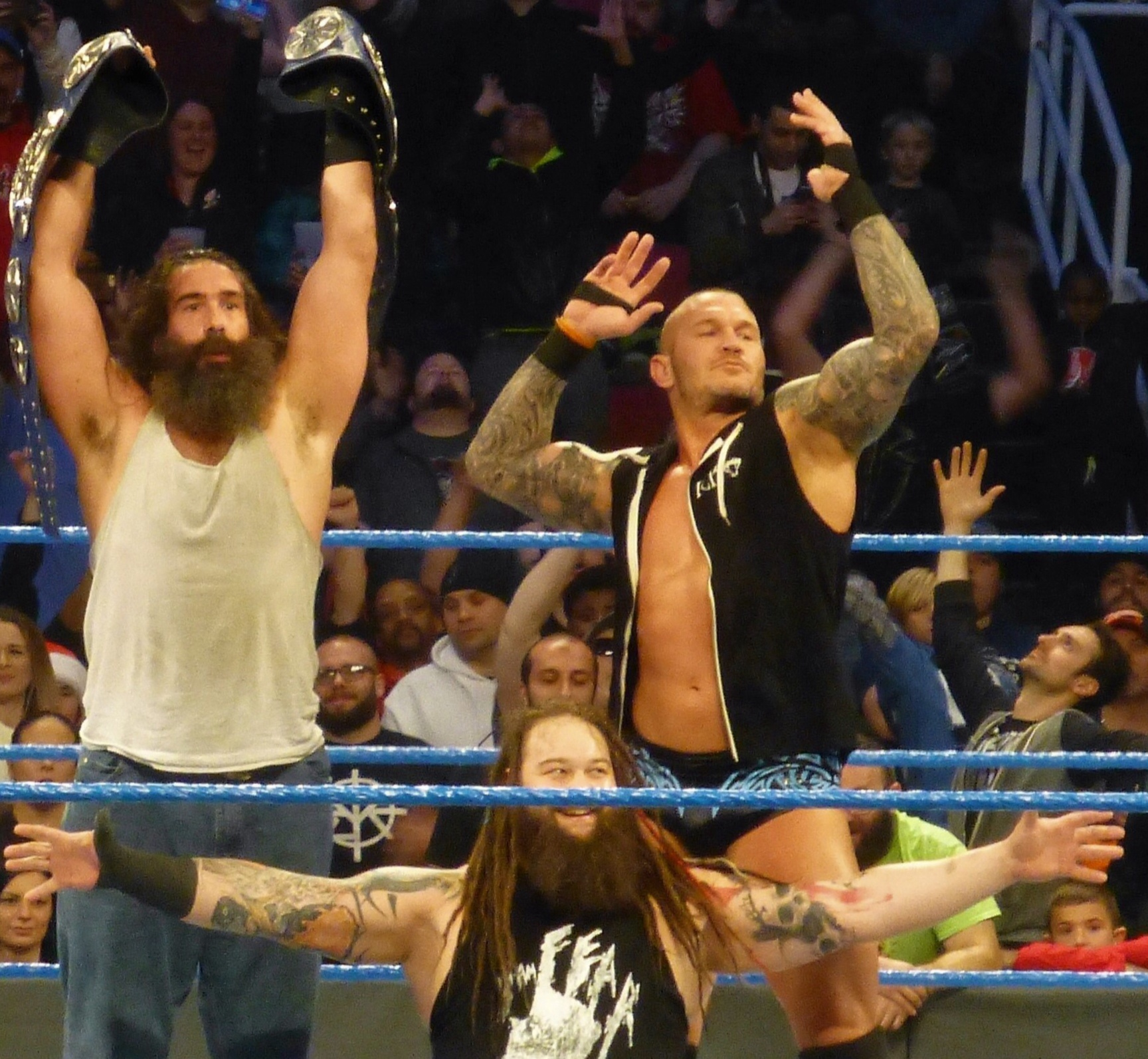
Randy Orton (right) and Bray Wyatt (below) faced off at WrestleMania 33 for the WWE Championship, in a feud that also partly involved Luke Harper (left).

At the Royal Rumble, SmackDown's Randy Orton won his second Royal Rumble match, earning himself a world championship match at WrestleMania 33 for his brand's WWE Championship. At Elimination Chamber, Bray Wyatt won the Elimination Chamber match to become the new WWE Champion. As a devoted Wyatt Family member, Orton relinquished his championship opportunity. SmackDown General Manager Daniel Bryan then scheduled a battle royal to determine Wyatt's WrestleMania challenger; it ended in a draw when both AJ Styles and Luke Harper hit the ground simultaneously. Styles then defeated Harper the following week to earn the title match, but at the conclusion of the episode, Orton restated his intentions to challenge Wyatt for the WWE Championship by appearing at the Wyatt Family compound, where Wyatt Family's matriarch Sister Abigail was buried, and setting the compound ablaze, turning face in the process. A number one contender's match between Orton and Styles was scheduled in which Orton won.

At WrestleMania XX in 2004, Goldberg defeated Brock Lesnar in their first match against each other. Both left the company after the event, but Lesnar returned in 2012. After twelve years, Goldberg returned in 2016 and immediately began a feud with Lesnar. He defeated Lesnar at Survivor Series in one minute and twenty-six seconds, and also quickly eliminated him from the Royal Rumble match. The next night on Raw, Lesnar and Paul Heyman appeared and challenged Goldberg to one final match at WrestleMania 33. Goldberg accepted Lesnar's challenge and also challenged Kevin Owens for the Universal Championship at Fastlane, which he won, turning their match into a title match for the Universal title. The following night on Raw, new Universal Champion Goldberg came out but was interrupted by Brock Lesnar and Paul Heyman. Lesnar attempted to shake Goldberg's hand to congratulate him, but Goldberg refused. Heyman then said that Goldberg would be "Brock's bitch" at WrestleMania and Lesnar attacked Goldberg with an F-5. The following week, Lesnar and Heyman gloated about Lesnar's attack on Goldberg. On the final Raw before WrestleMania, Goldberg and Lesnar had one last confrontation where Goldberg speared Lesnar.

==== Undercard matches ====
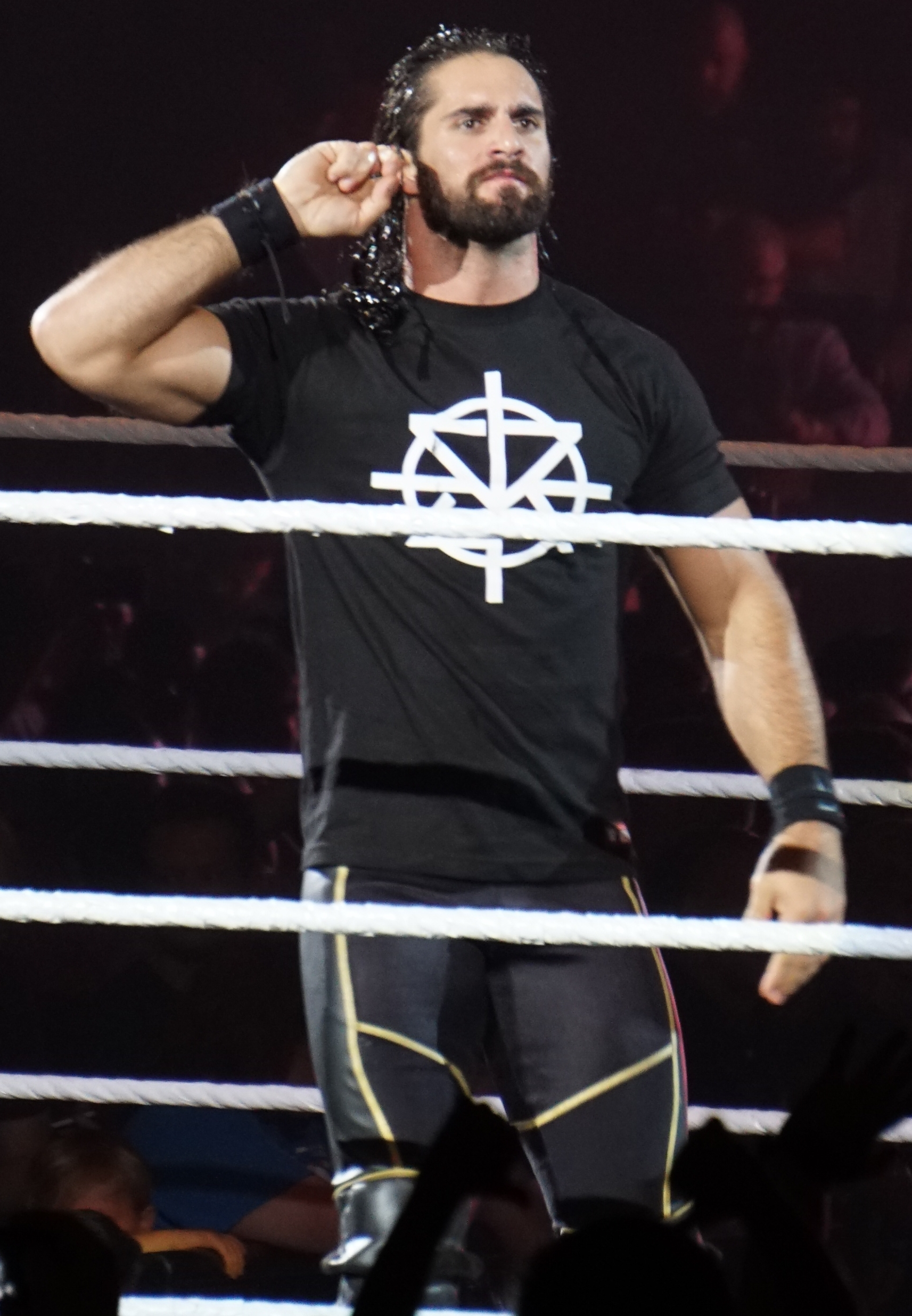
Seth Rollins had to overcome a knee injury, just a few weeks before WrestleMania 33, to face Triple H at the event.

In 2014, The Shield (Seth Rollins, Dean Ambrose, and Roman Reigns) were involved in a rivalry with Evolution (Triple H, Randy Orton, and Batista). After multiple losses to The Shield and Batista quitting WWE, Triple H recruited Rollins to The Authority. Rollins was the forefront of The Authority and won the WWE World Heavyweight Championship (later renamed WWE Championship) at WrestleMania 31, but was forced to vacate the title in November 2015 due to injury. He returned in mid-2016, and during a fatal four-way for the vacant WWE Universal Championship, Triple H aided Rollins in eliminating Reigns, but then turned on Rollins by attacking him with a Pedigree, costing Rollins the match. During the first months of 2017, Rollins started a rivalry with Triple H, asking for answers. At NXT TakeOver: San Antonio, Rollins appeared and challenged Triple H to a match, who had Rollins escorted from the building by security. On the January 30 episode of Raw, as Rollins was about to confront Triple H, Samoa Joe attacked Rollins, re-injuring his knee. Rollins was estimated to be out of action for up to eight weeks, but after an attack from Triple H, Rollins signed a contract for a non-sanctioned match with Triple H at WrestleMania 33, which forbid Rollins from suing WWE if he were to get injured again.

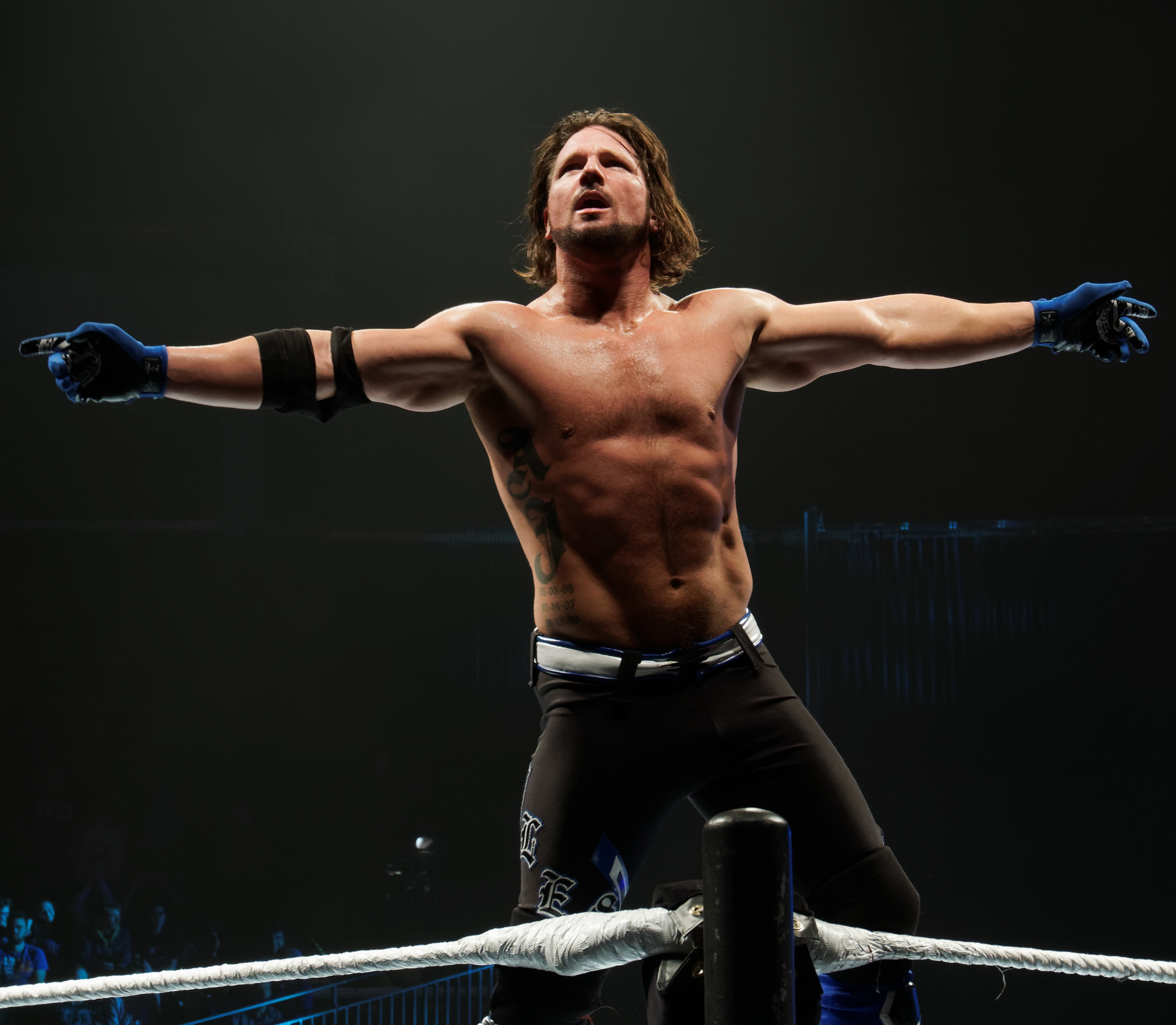
After not getting a match for the WWE Championship at this event, AJ Styles started a feud with Shane McMahon that led to a match at WrestleMania 33.

After losing the WWE Championship at Royal Rumble, AJ Styles asked for a rematch, which SmackDown Commissioner Shane McMahon promised if Styles did not win the title back in the Elimination Chamber match. At the event, Bray Wyatt won the championship. Styles received a rematch, but in the form of a triple threat match, also including John Cena, where Wyatt retained. After Randy Orton relinquished his championship opportunity, Styles entered into a number one contender's battle royal, which ended in a draw between him and Luke Harper. After defeating Harper to become the number one contender, Orton restated his intentions to challenge for the title, so McMahon and Daniel Bryan decided that Styles would have to compete in another number one contender's match, this time against Orton, who won. The following week, Styles attacked McMahon and threw him through a car window. Styles was subsequently (kayfabe) fired by Bryan, but at the end of the show, an injured McMahon challenged Styles to a match at WrestleMania 33, which Styles accepted.

In mid-2016, Chris Jericho and Kevin Owens began teaming and assisting each other. Jericho played a part in Owens winning the vacant Universal Championship. Over the next several months, Jericho assisted Owens in retaining his title in various defenses. The two also defeated Roman Reigns in a handicap match, with Jericho winning Reigns' United States Championship. After Owens retained his title at the Royal Rumble, Jericho accepted Goldberg's challenge on Owens' behalf for the Universal Championship at Fastlane, which was made official to the dismay of Owens. Jericho then held a "Festival of Friendship" for Owens, who turned on Jericho and brutally attacked him. In retaliation, Jericho cost Owens his Universal Championship match at Fastlane. On the following Raw, Jericho challenged Owens to a match at WrestleMania 33. Owens agreed only if it were for the United States Championship, and Jericho agreed.

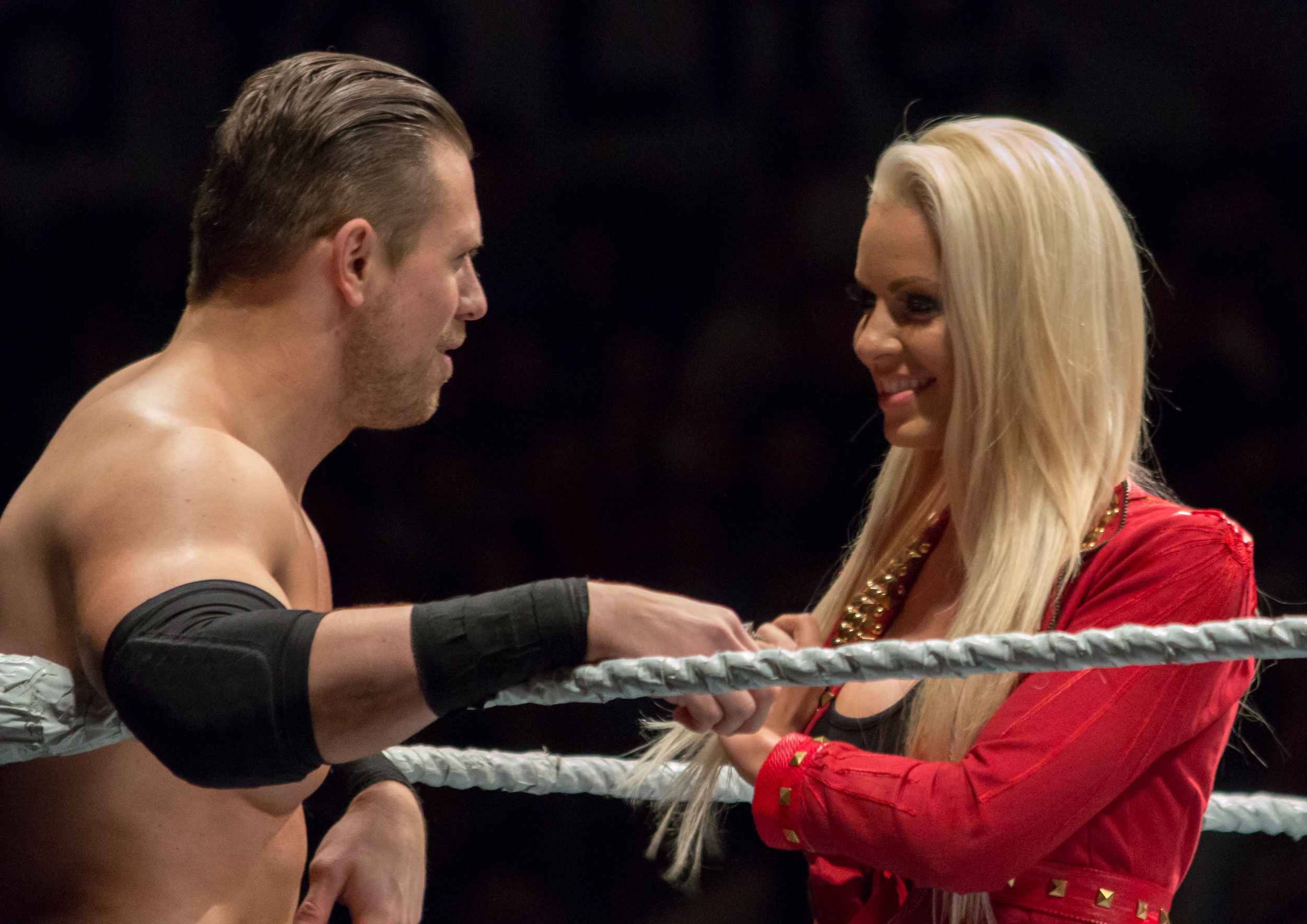
The Miz and Maryse (pictured) began a feud with John Cena and Nikki Bella that would lead to a mixed tag team match at WrestleMania 33, which would be Maryse's first match since her return to the company in 2016.

At Elimination Chamber, The Miz was eliminated by John Cena in the WWE Championship Elimination Chamber match. Cena then eliminated Miz in the number one contender battle royal, and Miz retaliated by returning and eliminating Cena. Cena was then a guest on Miz TV where Miz criticized Cena for being a hypocrite, as Cena was basically doing the same thing that he himself had criticized The Rock for doing: leaving WWE and going to Hollywood. Miz said that despite his hard work, he did not get the same opportunities as Cena, and he eliminated Cena to prevent him from going to WrestleMania 33. Cena criticized Miz for copying other people's gimmicks and moves, which caused Maryse to slap Cena for insulting her husband. Cena's girlfriend Nikki Bella then came out and Maryse and Miz retreated. During the following weeks, Miz and Maryse made fun of Cena and Nikki's reality show Total Bellas by impersonating them in "unaired footage". This ultimately led to Daniel Bryan scheduling a mixed tag team match between the two couples at WrestleMania.

At Roadblock: End of the Line, Charlotte Flair defeated Sasha Banks to win her record fourth Raw Women's Championship, ending their long feud and, as per a post-event stipulation, as long as one of them was champion, the other could not challenge for the title. Charlotte then began a feud with Bayley, losing the title against her on the February 13 episode of Raw, thanks to help from Banks. Also during this time, Banks entered into a feud with Nia Jax. Bayley retained the title against Flair at Fastlane after an interference from Banks, who defeated Jax on the Kickoff pre-show. The following weeks, Bayley was defeated by Banks and Jax. Both Flair and Banks touted their reasons why they should challenge Bayley for the title at WrestleMania 33, leading to a triple threat match being scheduled. Jax was then added, turning the match into a fatal four-way elimination match. On Raw, Bayley and Banks teamed up and defeated Flair and Jax. After the match, Jax laid out her three WrestleMania opponents.

On the Royal Rumble Kickoff pre-show, Luke Gallows and Karl Anderson defeated Cesaro and Sheamus to win the Raw Tag Team Championship. Cesaro and Sheamus invoked their rematch, but lost due to interference from Enzo Amore and Big Cass. On the February 20 episode of Raw, Amore and Cass defeated Cesaro and Sheamus to receive a tag title match at Fastlane, where Gallows and Anderson retained. A rematch occurred the following night on Raw where Cesaro and Sheamus got involved, costing Enzo and Cass the titles. Later on, Raw General Manager Mick Foley scheduled Cesaro and Sheamus to face Amore and Cass on the next episode, with the winners going on to challenge Gallows and Anderson for the titles at WrestleMania 33. However, during that match, Gallows and Anderson attacked both teams, causing a double disqualification. Foley then scheduled Gallows and Anderson to defend the titles against both teams at WrestleMania in a triple threat match. The following weeks, Gallows and Anderson attacked the others with a ladder. The WrestleMania match was then turned into a triple threat ladder match for the Raw Tag Team Championship.

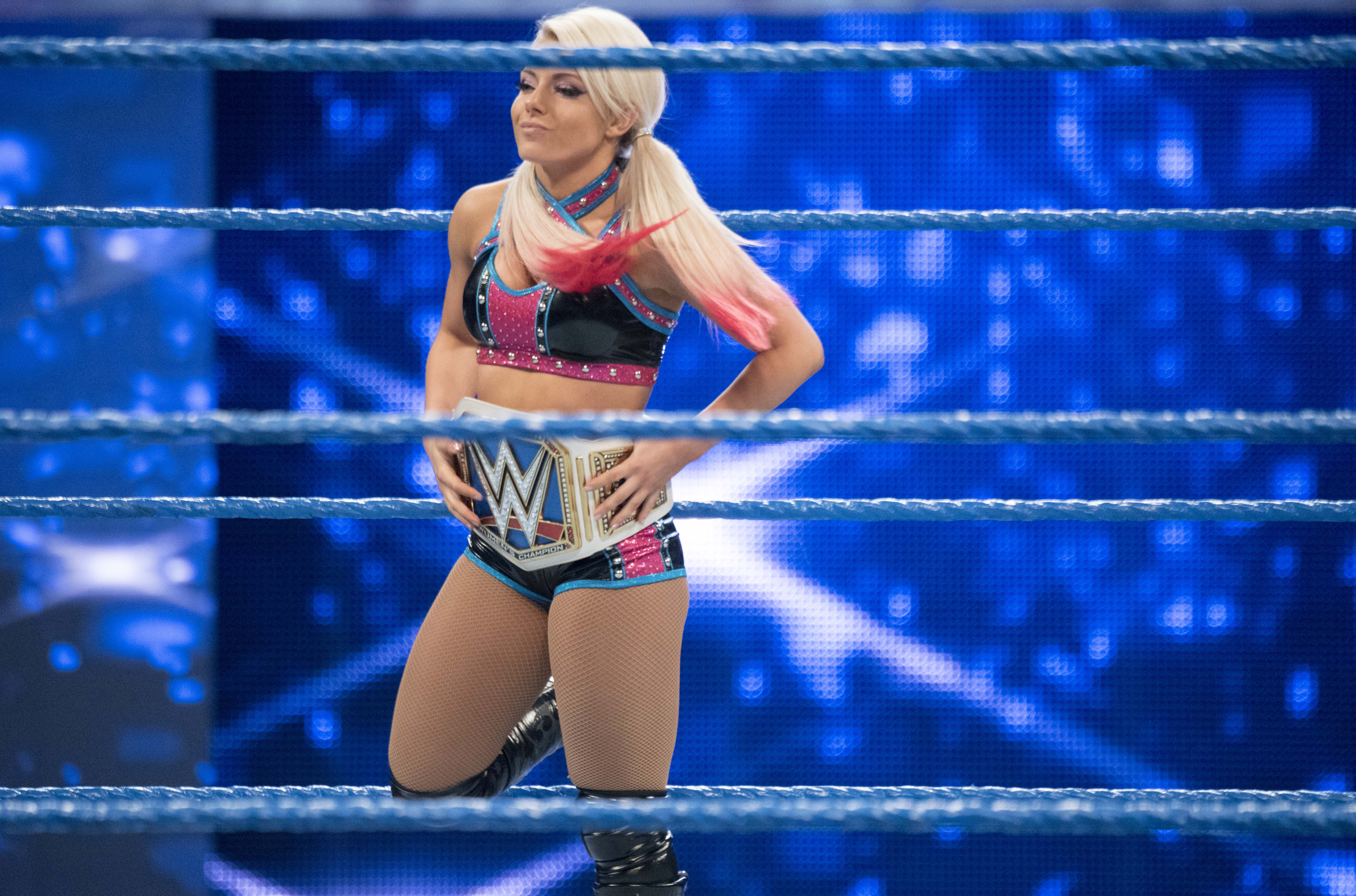
Alexa Bliss defended the SmackDown Women's Championship against all available female wrestlers of the SmackDown brand at WrestleMania 33.

At Elimination Chamber, Naomi defeated Alexa Bliss to win the SmackDown Women's Championship, but a legit injury forced her to relinquish the title. Bliss then defeated Becky Lynch for the vacant title. On the March 7 episode of SmackDown, Becky, Natalya, and even Bliss' ally Mickie James all demanded to challenge for the championship at WrestleMania 33. Daniel Bryan decided that Bliss would defend the title against all available female SmackDown wrestlers at WrestleMania. On the final SmackDown before WrestleMania, Naomi returned and confirmed that she would be in the match at WrestleMania, making it a six-pack challenge.

==== Pre-show matches ====
At Elimination Chamber during the WWE Championship Elimination Chamber match, Baron Corbin was eliminated by the Intercontinental Champion Dean Ambrose. Then, Corbin executed the "End of Days" on him before he left the chamber, causing his elimination. During the following weeks, both wrestlers attacked each other, leading to a match at WrestleMania for the Intercontinental title. The match was moved to the Kickoff pre-show.

After retaining the WWE Cruiserweight Championship for several months, Neville said there was no one left in the cruiserweight division that could compete with him. Austin Aries, who had been out of action due to injury, disagreed and attacked Neville. On the March 14 episode of 205 Live, Aries won a fatal five-way elimination match to face Neville for the title on the WrestleMania 33 Kickoff pre-show.

== Event ==
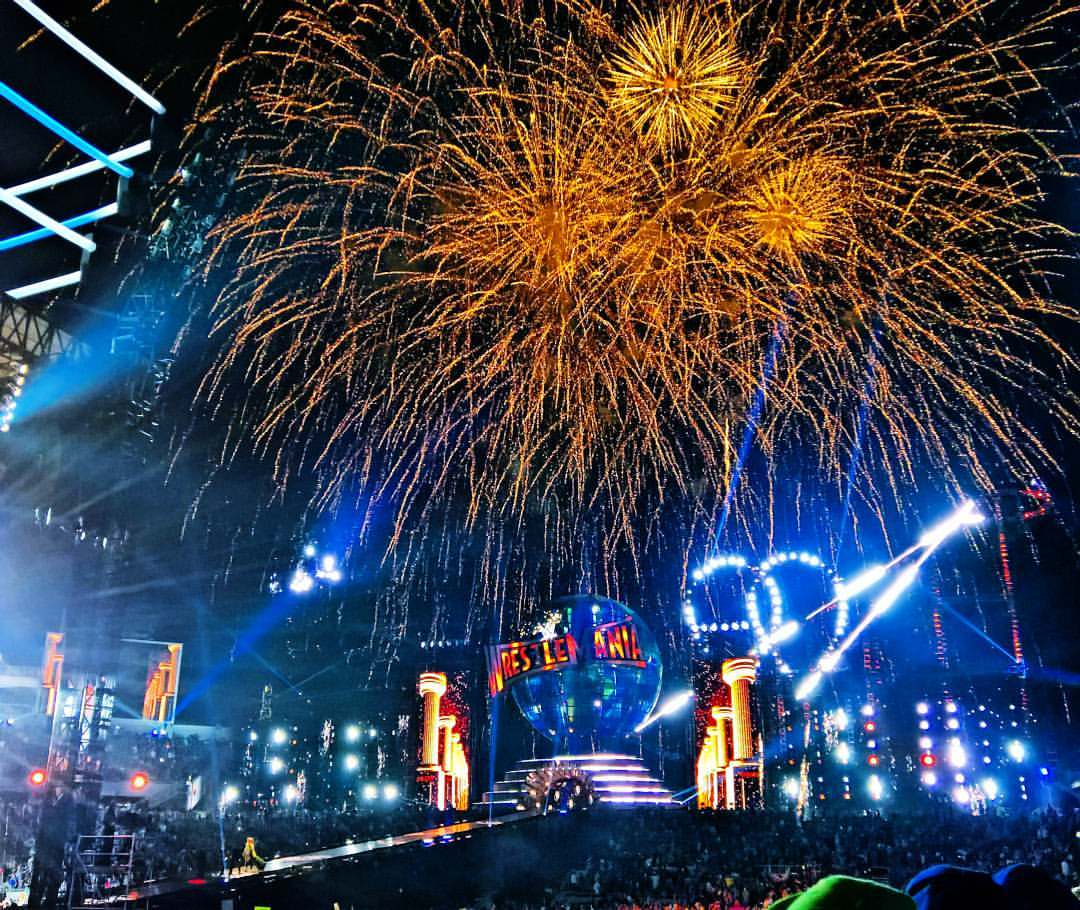
Camping World Stadium during WrestleMania 33

Other on-screen personnel
Role:	Name:
Hosts	The New Day (Big E, Kofi Kingston, and Xavier Woods)
English commentators
English commentators	Michael Cole (Raw/battle royal/main event)
English commentators	Corey Graves (Raw/Cruiserweight match)
English commentators	Byron Saxton (Raw/battle royal)
English commentators	Tom Phillips (SmackDown/mixed tag team match/Cruiserweight match)
English commentators	John "Bradshaw" Layfield (SmackDown/battle royal/mixed tag team match/main event)
English commentators	David Otunga (SmackDown)
English commentators	Jim Ross (Main event)
English commentators	Jerry Lawler (Mixed tag team match)
German commentators	Sebastian Hackl
German commentators	Carsten Schaefer
Portuguese commentators	Marco Alfaro
Portuguese commentators	Roberto Figueroa
Spanish commentators	Carlos Cabrera
Spanish commentators	Marcelo Rodríguez
Ring announcers	Greg Hamilton (SmackDown)
Ring announcers	JoJo (Raw)
Ring announcers	Al Roker (Mixed tag team match)
Referees	Jason Ayers
Referees	Shawn Bennett
Referees	Mike Chioda
Referees	John Cone
Referees	Dan Engler
Referees	Darrick Moore
Referees	Chad Patton
Referees	Charles Robinson
Referees	Ryan Tran
Referees	Rod Zapata
Backstage interviewers	Charly Caruso
Backstage interviewers	Maria Menounos
Pre-show panel	Renee Young
Pre-show panel	Booker T
Pre-show panel	Jerry Lawler
Pre-show panel	Shawn Michaels
Pre-show panel	Lita

=== Pre-show ===
Three matches were contested on the two-hour long WrestleMania 33 Kickoff pre-show. In the first match, Neville defended the WWE Cruiserweight Championship against Austin Aries. In the climax, as Aries applied the "Last Chancery" on Neville, Neville poked Aries' eyes to escape and performed a "Red Arrow" on Aries to retain the title.

Next, 33 wrestlers competed in the André the Giant Memorial Battle Royal, including previously unannounced participants Kalisto, Sin Cara, Luke Harper, Titus O'Neil, The Vaudevillains (Simon Gotch and Aiden English) and The Ascension (Konnor and Viktor). In the climax, Jinder Mahal taunted New England Patriots tight end Rob Gronkowski, who was sitting at ringside. This prompted Gronkowski to enter the ring and shove Mahal. Mojo Rawley then eliminated Mahal to win the match.

In the last pre-show match, Dean Ambrose defended the WWE Intercontinental Championship against Baron Corbin. In the end, Corbin attempted the "End of Days" on Ambrose, who countered and performed "Dirty Deeds" on Corbin to retain the title.

=== Preliminary matches ===
The actual pay-per-view opened with the hosts, The New Day (Big E, Kofi Kingston, and Xavier Woods), who were dressed as characters inspired by Final Fantasy XIV: Stormblood, a sponsor of the event. They made their entrance and hyped the live crowd for the event.

In the first match, AJ Styles faced Shane McMahon. During the match, Styles attempted a springboard 450° splash on Shane, who countered into a triangle choke on Styles, who then countered into a one-armed "Styles Clash" on Shane for a near-fall. After the referee was knocked down, Styles attempted a "Coast-to-Coast" on Shane, who countered by attacking Styles with a trash can. Shane then performed a "Coast-to-Coast" into a trash can on Styles for a near-fall. Shane attempted a "Leap of Faith" through an announce table on Styles, who moved and Shane fell through the announce table. As Styles attempted a "Phenomenal Forearm", Shane countered into a float-over DDT on Styles. Shane attempted a shooting star press, but Styles avoided and performed a "Phenomenal Forearm" on Shane to win the match.

Next, Chris Jericho defended the WWE United States Championship against Kevin Owens. Owens attempted a pop-up powerbomb on Jericho, who countered and performed a "Lionsault" on Owens for a near-fall. Owens applied the "Walls of Jericho" on Jericho, who escaped. Owens performed a pop-up powerbomb on Jericho for a near-fall. As Owens attempted a second pop-up powerbomb on Jericho, Jericho countered into a "Codebreaker" on Owens, who touched the ring ropes with one finger to void the pinfall at a two count. In the end, Owens performed a powerbomb on Jericho onto the ring apron and pinned him to win his first United States Championship.

After that, Bayley defended the WWE Raw Women's Championship against Charlotte Flair, Nia Jax and Sasha Banks in a fatal four-way elimination match. Bayley, Flair, and Banks performed a triple powerbomb on Jax and all three pinned Jax to eliminate her. Banks applied the "Bank Statement" on Flair, who escaped. Banks attempted a pinning combination on Flair, who kicked out and sent Banks into an exposed turnbuckle, after which, Flair pinned Banks to eliminate her. In the end, Flair collided with the exposed turnbuckle, allowing Bayley to perform a diving elbow drop on Flair to retain the title.

In the fourth match, Luke Gallows and Karl Anderson were originally scheduled to defend the WWE Raw Tag Team Championship against Cesaro and Sheamus and Enzo Amore and Big Cass in a triple threat ladder match. Before the match, hosts The New Day announced that a mystery fourth team had been added to the match. The team in question was revealed to be the returning Hardy Boyz (Jeff Hardy and Matt Hardy), making their first WWE appearances since August 2009 (Jeff) and October 2010 (Matt) respectively. This surprise came after they had lost the ROH World Tag Team Championship to The Young Bucks the previous day at Ring of Honor's Supercard of Honor XI evet. In the end, Matt performed a "Twist of Fate" off a ladder on Anderson and Jeff performed a "Swanton Bomb" off a ladder through a bridged ladder on Cesaro and Sheamus. Matt then retrieved the title belts to win the championship for the first time as a team; individually, the first time for Jeff and the second time for Matt, and seventh time overall.

Later, John Cena and Nikki Bella faced The Miz and Maryse in a mixed tag team match with Al Roker serving as the special guest ring announcer. In the end, as Bella and Maryse were the legal wrestlers, Cena and Bella performed "Five Knuckle Shuffles" on Miz and Maryse. Cena performed an "Attitude Adjustment" on Miz whilst Bella performed a "Rack Attack 2.0" on Maryse. Cena and Bella pinned both Miz and Maryse to win the match. After the match, Cena proposed to Nikki, who accepted.

Next, Seth Rollins then faced Triple H in a non-sanctioned match. During the match, Rollins attempted a "Pedigree" on Triple H, who countered into a DDT on Rollins onto an announce table. Triple H targeted Rollins' leg, applying an inverted figure-four leglock on Rollins, who rolled out of the ring to escape the hold. Triple H retrieved his signature sledgehammer, only for Rollins to perform an enzuigiri on Triple H. As Rollins retrieved the sledgehammer, Stephanie McMahon snatched the weapon away from Rollins. This allowed Triple H to perform a "Pedigree" on Rollins for a near-fall. As Triple H attempted a "Pedigree" on Rollins from the top rope, Rollins countered and performed a "Phoenix Splash" on Triple H for a near-fall. After trading counters, Rollins performed a superkick on Triple H, who bumped into Stephanie, causing her to crash through a table. Rollins then performed a "Pedigree" on Triple H to win the match.

Next, Bray Wyatt defended the WWE Championship against Randy Orton. At the beginning of the match, Orton attempted an "RKO" on Wyatt, who rolled out of the ring. During the match, Wyatt played mind games on Orton by having large images of different insects appear on the ring canvas. Outside of the ring, Wyatt performed "Sister Abigail" on Orton into the barricade. Orton then performed an "RKO" on Wyatt and scored a near-fall. Wyatt performed "Sister Abigail" on Orton for a near-fall. Orton then performed another "RKO" on Wyatt to win his ninth WWE Championship and his first at WrestleMania.

After that, Goldberg defended the WWE Universal Championship against Brock Lesnar (accompanied by Paul Heyman). Lesnar performed three German suplexes on Goldberg, who quickly recovered and performed two spears on Lesnar, who then rolled out of the ring. Goldberg then performed a spear on Lesnar through the barricade into the timekeeper's area. Goldberg got Lesnar back into the ring and attempted a "Jackhammer", but Lesnar countered and attempted an "F-5" on Goldberg, who also countered and performed another spear, followed by a "Jackhammer" on Lesnar, who became the first man to kick-out of the spear-"Jackhammer" combo. Goldberg attempted the fifth spear, but Lesnar avoided Goldberg with a leapfrog and performed seven more German suplexes on him. Lesnar then performed an "F-5" on Goldberg to win his first Universal Championship and gave Goldberg his first clean singles loss of his career. This win also made Lesnar the first wrestler to win both the WWE Championship and Universal Championship.

In the penultimate match, Alexa Bliss defended the WWE SmackDown Women's Championship against Becky Lynch, Naomi, Mickie James, Natalya, and Carmella in a six-pack challenge. The end came when Naomi forced Bliss to submit to the "Slay-o-Mission" to win her second SmackDown Women's Championship, tying the record.

=== Main event ===
In the main event, the match between The Undertaker and Roman Reigns was revealed to be a No Holds Barred match. Jim Ross returned as a guest commentator. In the ringside, The Undertaker threw Reigns to one of the steel steps and performed a Chokeslam on him onto an announce table, who then performed a Spear on The Undertaker through another announce table. The Undertaker performed a Last Ride on Reigns for a near-fall. Reigns performed two Superman Punches on The Undertaker, who attacked Reigns with a chair and performed a Chokeslam on him onto it for a near-fall. The Undertaker performed a Tombstone Piledriver on Reigns for a near-fall. As The Undertaker attempted a second Tombstone Piledriver, Reigns countered into a Superman Punch for a near-fall. Reigns executed another Spear, but The Undertaker applied Hell's Gate, with Reigns managing to escape. Reigns attacked The Undertaker with the same chair and performed two Spears, with both scored near-falls. The Undertaker attempted his signature sit-up, but suddenly collapsed. After another Spear, Reigns pinned The Undertaker to win the match and become the second person to defeat The Undertaker at WrestleMania after Brock Lesnar ended The Streak at WrestleMania XXX. After the match, The Undertaker symbolically left his gloves, coat and hat in the center of the ring. In a very rare moment, The Undertaker broke character and shared a kiss with his wife Michelle McCool, who was seated in the front row crying. The Undertaker walked to the center of the entrance ramp, looked at the crowd and raised his arm, as he was lowered below the stage to the sound of his music and his signature gong sounded three times, as the show ended. In the arena, the main stage lighting (not the crowd's lighting) was left off for the remainder of the evening and The Undertaker's clothes were left in the ring, as the production crew cleaned up only taking his clothing articles when it was time to disassemble the ring.

== Reception ==
WrestleMania 33 received mixed reviews from critics. Matt Geradi and Kevin Pang of The A.V. Club co-reviewed WrestleMania. Pang criticized the event for being "long and exhausting to watch at home", with "nothing that would win match-of-the-year in a 2017 poll" and "minimum" surprises. Geradi felt that the event exceeded his expectations and "the storytelling was on point all night", but it was a "tremendously front-loaded show". Yet Geradi and Pang agreed that everything "didn't matter" as WrestleMania "was about one story—the end of The Undertaker"; both reviewers agreed that the main event was "sad", with Pang also describing it as "ugly". Although "Shawn Michaels' sympathy and expressiveness" made Ric Flair's retirement at WrestleMania "moving and memorable", Geradi chided Reigns for having "barely mustered an ounce of anything other than disbelief and exasperation" as it "was business as usual for The Big Dog". For the other matches, Pang wrote that Aries–Neville fulfilled expectations as the "best technical match" with an "especially killer" finish, while Gerardi described Jericho–Owens as "really solidly worked with some clever, unique spots, and the in-ring story with all the counters was great stuff".

Dave Meltzer of the Wrestling Observer Newsletter described WrestleMania 33 as "a long but extremely newsworthy show" finished off with the "retirement" ceremony for the Undertaker, whose match was "as good as could be expected as they went long". Meltzer described that though the crowd was tired at the finish of the main event, WWE "did clearly turn down the sound" and "then they hit the pyro". For the Universal title match, Meltzer wrote that it "was what was expected" and the "match was pretty much perfect considering how late it was", with the live audience "going nuts through all of this". For McMahon–Styles, Meltzer commented that the "match had its moments that were spectacular", and that the "story was that Shane was the real striker and got the better of that". For Ambrose–Corbin, Meltzer felt it was "certainly a lot less than you'd think for a WrestleMania match", while the Raw women's match was "too short for an elimination match", and the Raw tag team title match "wasn't as good as what [sic] most WrestleMania ladder matches but the crowd went completely nuts for the Hardys". Although WWE "may have turned down the crowd noise" for Cena's proposal, Meltzer felt the proposal was "really great". Lastly, Meltzer said that Rawley winning the battle royal was "largely for the mainstream coverage of Rob Gronkowski".

Jack de Menezes of The Independent wrote that WrestleMania 33 was "an emotional night for fans", especially due to the "brutal ending" of the Undertaker's career. With Reigns' "disappointing, error-strewn display ... compared to some of the other eye-catching displays at WrestleMania", de Menezes questioned if the "obvious passing of the torch by the WWE" was "the right decision". For the other memorable moments of the night, de Menezes described the return of The Hardy Boyz as "incredible and triumphant", the Orton–Wyatt match as a "creepy and disturbing affair", Naomi recapturing the SmackDown women's title as "a homecoming to remember", McMahon–Styles as a match "filled with highlight moments" and Cena's proposal as "unthinkable".

Luis Paez-Pumar of Rolling Stone described WrestleMania as "two-faced as a Gemini"—the first half "was a brisk hybrid of styles and matches that made you think that WWE knew what it was doing all along with this lackluster build", but once Triple H appeared, the rest of the event "was a slog of plodding wrestling, brief matches and boos". Paez-Pumar described that The Undertaker as "should have retired when the Streak was broken", but "lived on to pass the rub onto Reigns in the sloppiest, saddest manner possible". Paez-Pumar proclaimed that "WWE has no idea how to handle Bray Wyatt", writing that Orton "definitely did not need the title" and ridiculing Wyatt's conjuring of "projected video screen grossness" as "the dumbest crap". Paez-Pumar called for "fresh blood or new ideas" in both women's divisions and for Triple H to retire given that he "has not put on a good Mania match" since 2005 or 2006 once WrestleMania XXX was discounted. For the positives, Goldberg–Lesnar was a "revitalizing adrenaline shot to the spine", Cena's proposal was "magic in a way that no other entertainment can match", The New Day "were excellent hosts; funny when called upon and out of the way when not", while "a stale-ass tag team division just became the most must-see part of Raw" due to the return of the Hardys. The match between Orton and Wyatt was voted by The Wrestling Observer Newsletter as the Worst Match of the Year.

In 2020, The Undertaker said during an interview he was disappointed of his performance against Reigns.

== Aftermath ==
There had been much speculation that Undertaker had competed in his final match. While it was not confirmed on air, the WWE online merchandise store released a commemorative photo plaque showing a photo of Undertaker's gear that he left in the ring, with the description stating that he had ended his in-ring career. In addition, Dave Meltzer of Wrestling Observer reported that Undertaker would be getting surgeries for his injuries, specifically a hip replacement surgery that Undertaker held off due to his commitments with WWE. However, after being challenged to a match at WrestleMania the following year, Undertaker made an impromptu return and defeated John Cena at WrestleMania 34. Undertaker continued to wrestle sporadically over the next couple of years until he had his official final match at WrestleMania 36 where he defeated AJ Styles in a Boneyard match. His retirement ceremony was then held at Survivor Series on November 22, 2020, which also celebrated the 30th anniversary of his WWE debut, which occurred at the 1990 Survivor Series.

Although John Cena had proposed to Nikki Bella at the event with plans to wed the following year, on April 15, 2018, Nikki announced on her Instagram account that she and Cena had ended their six-year-long relationship.

Chris Jericho admitted in 2021 during his appearance on The Broken Skull Sessions that the placement of his match with Kevin Owens was the proverbial straw that broke the camel's back with WWE, making him seek work elsewhere. The original plan for WrestleMania was for Jericho to win the Universal Championship from Owens in the main event, but then Vince McMahon changed his mind. Jericho stated he understood why McMahon changed his mind, but opined that at the very least, his match with Owens should have been first. To have it shunted to the second match of the show meant to Jericho that he was always going to be a "mid-card guy" in WWE and he felt he still had main event potential, so he decided to look for work elsewhere.

=== Raw ===
On the post-WrestleMania 33 Raw the following night, the show opened with "Undertaker" and "Roman sucks" chants from the live audience, which was interrupted by Roman Reigns. After the crowd blasted Reigns with torrid boos and several minutes of hostile chants, Reigns left after only stating, "This is my yard now!" A lot of the crowd hostility arose from the speculation that WrestleMania 33 was The Undertaker's last match, as well as the long running fan opposition to Reigns. After that segment, WWE commentators labelled the post-WrestleMania 33 crowd as "non-traditional WWE fans" who may cheer for those they normally boo and boo those they normally cheer "all in the name of fun". This echoed similar comments a year prior for the post-WrestleMania 32 crowd, which The A.V. Club described as WWE's "aggressive" and condescending "disclaimers" meant to shame the hardcore audience.

Later, new Universal Champion Brock Lesnar's advocate, Paul Heyman, declared that Goldberg would not be seen again and teased a match between Lesnar and Roman Reigns. Braun Strowman came out and declared that after he himself was done with Reigns, who he had been feuding with prior to WrestleMania, he would be coming for Lesnar and his title. After the show, on Raw Talk, Goldberg stated that his WrestleMania match may have been his last, but hinted that he could return. The following week, Strowman brutally attacked Reigns during a backstage interview and overturned the ambulance that Reigns was in. Afterwards, Reigns was taken to the hospital in another ambulance. A match between the two was scheduled for Payback. Lesnar would hold on to the title for the remainder of the year. At WrestleMania 34, Lesnar and Reigns had a match for the title after it was teased by Heyman over a year ago.

Also on the post-WrestleMania Raw, WWE Chairman Vince McMahon explained that his daughter, Stephanie, would be off television for a while due to her crashing through a table at WrestleMania, and then introduced 2017 WWE Hall of Fame inductee Kurt Angle as the new Raw General Manager. He also announced that there would be a Superstar Shake-up the following week between Raw and SmackDown, a talent trade between the two brands.

Chris Jericho was granted a rematch for the United States Championship against Kevin Owens at Payback. He was then attacked backstage by Owens and Samoa Joe. Jericho was subsequently replaced in a tag team match by the returning Finn Bálor. On the April 11 episode of SmackDown, the Superstar Shake-up moved Owens to SmackDown, but it was decided that if Jericho won the United States Championship at Payback, he would also move to SmackDown. Also, Seth Rollins resumed his rivalry with Samoa Joe and the two were scheduled to fight at Payback.

Also on the post-WrestleMania Raw, The Hardy Boyz retained their Raw Tag Team Championship against Luke Gallows and Karl Anderson, while Cesaro and Sheamus earned a title shot at Payback by defeating Enzo Amore and Big Cass. The New Day issued an open challenge, which was answered by NXT's The Revival (Scott Dawson and Dash Wilder) in their main roster debut. The Revival defeated and continued to beat down New Day, injuring Kofi Kingston's ankle. The following week, The New Day (Big E and Xavier Woods) lost a rematch against Revival and were moved to SmackDown as part of the Superstar Shake-up.

In the women's division, Raw Women's Champion Bayley, Sasha Banks, and Dana Brooke defeated Charlotte Flair, Nia Jax, and the returning Emma. The following week, Banks was about to challenge Bayley to a title match when she was interrupted by Alexa Bliss and Mickie James, who moved over from SmackDown as a result of the Superstar Shake-up; Charlotte was moved to the SmackDown brand. Bliss subsequently earned a title match at Payback by winning a fatal four-way match.

=== SmackDown ===
On the post-WrestleMania SmackDown, Bray Wyatt challenged the newly-crowned WWE Champion Randy Orton to a "House of Horrors" non-title match, which Orton accepted. In the ensuing brawl, Luke Harper and the returning Erick Rowan came out to help Orton and Wyatt, respectively. Subsequently, Orton and Harper defeated Wyatt and Rowan. Wyatt was moved to Raw the following week and his rematch with Orton was scheduled for the Raw-exclusive pay-per-view, Payback.

Also on the post-WrestleMania SmackDown, SmackDown Commissioner Shane McMahon addressed the Superstar Shake-Up. His WrestleMania opponent, AJ Styles, interrupted him, saying that he wanted to stay on SmackDown, and then shook Shane's hand out of respect. The following week, Styles was confirmed to stay on SmackDown and he defeated Baron Corbin and Sami Zayn, who had moved over from Raw, to become the number one contender for the United States Championship at Backlash.

In a non-title rematch, Baron Corbin defeated Intercontinental Champion Dean Ambrose in a Street Fight. This would be their last encounter as Ambrose, with the championship, moved to the Raw brand as a result of the Superstar Shake-up.

The Miz and Maryse continued their impersonation of John Cena and Nikki Bella. They claimed credit for Cena proposing to Nikki and mocked the newly-engaged couple, as they were taking a break from WWE post-WrestleMania. As they were leaving the ring, they were interrupted by the main roster debut of Shinsuke Nakamura. The Miz and Maryse were then moved to Raw, where they resumed their rivalry with Dean Ambrose. Jinder Mahal moved to SmackDown, where he continued his feud with Mojo Rawley and Rob Gronkowski. Rawley defeated Mahal following interference by Gronkowski. Both Mahal and Rawley then participated in a six-pack challenge, which Mahal won to become the #1 contender for the WWE Championship at Backlash.

In the women's division, Alexa Bliss lost her rematch for the SmackDown Women's Championship against Naomi. The following week, Bliss and Mickie James moved to Raw as a result of the Superstar Shake-up. Charlotte Flair, who moved over from Raw, defeated Naomi in a non-title match to become the number one contender.

=== 205 Live ===
In the cruiserweight division on the post-WrestleMania 205 Live, Austin Aries earned another title shot by winning a fatal four-way match, and it was scheduled for Payback.

== Results ==
No.	Results	Stipulations	Times
1^{P}	Neville (c) defeated Austin Aries by pinfall	Singles match for the WWE Cruiserweight Championship	15:40
2^{P}	Mojo Rawley won by last eliminating Jinder Mahal (Note: Order of elimination: Primo, Kalisto, Simon Gotch, Heath Slater, Jey Uso, Goldust, Konnor, Big Show, Viktor, Braun Strowman, Curt Hawkins, R-Truth, Rhyno, Aiden English, Curtis Axel, Jimmy Uso, Jason Jordan, Chad Gable, Tyler Breeze, Fandango, Sin Cara, Mark Henry, Tian Bing, Epico, Bo Dallas, Apollo Crews, Dolph Ziggler, Luke Harper, Titus O'Neil, Sami Zayn, Killian Dain, Jinder Mahal.)	33-man battle royal for the André the Giant Memorial Trophy	14:15
3^{P}	Dean Ambrose (c) defeated Baron Corbin by pinfall	Singles match for the WWE Intercontinental Championship	10:55
4	AJ Styles defeated Shane McMahon by pinfall	Singles match	20:35
5	Kevin Owens defeated Chris Jericho (c) by pinfall	Singles match for the WWE United States Championship	16:20
6	Bayley (c) defeated Charlotte Flair, Nia Jax, and Sasha Banks	Fatal four-way elimination match for the WWE Raw Women's Championship	12:45
7	The Hardy Boyz (Matt Hardy and Jeff Hardy) defeated Luke Gallows and Karl Anderson (c), Cesaro and Sheamus, and Enzo Amore and Big Cass	Fatal four-way tag team ladder match for the WWE Raw Tag Team Championship	11:05
8	John Cena and Nikki Bella defeated The Miz and Maryse by pinfall	Mixed tag team match	9:40
9	Seth Rollins defeated Triple H (with Stephanie McMahon) by pinfall	Non-sanctioned match	25:30
10	Randy Orton defeated Bray Wyatt (c) by pinfall	Singles match for the WWE Championship	10:30
11	Brock Lesnar (with Paul Heyman) defeated Goldberg (c) by pinfall	Singles match for the WWE Universal Championship	4:45
12	Naomi defeated Alexa Bliss (c), Becky Lynch, Carmella (with James Ellsworth), Mickie James, and Natalya by submission	Six-pack challenge for the WWE SmackDown Women's Championship	5:35
13	Roman Reigns defeated The Undertaker by pinfall	No Holds Barred match	23:00
(c) / – the champion(s) heading into the match; P / – the match was broadcast on the pre-show

=== Raw Women's Championship Fatal 4-Way match eliminations ===
Eliminated	Wrestler	Eliminated by	Method	Time
1	Nia Jax	Bayley, Charlotte Flair, and Sasha Banks	Pinfall	4:15
2	Sasha Banks	Charlotte Flair	Pinfall	8:30
3	Charlotte Flair	Bayley	Pinfall	12:45
Winner	Bayley (c)	—N/a		12:45
