= Ape Drums =

Mexican-American DJ and record producer (born 1990)

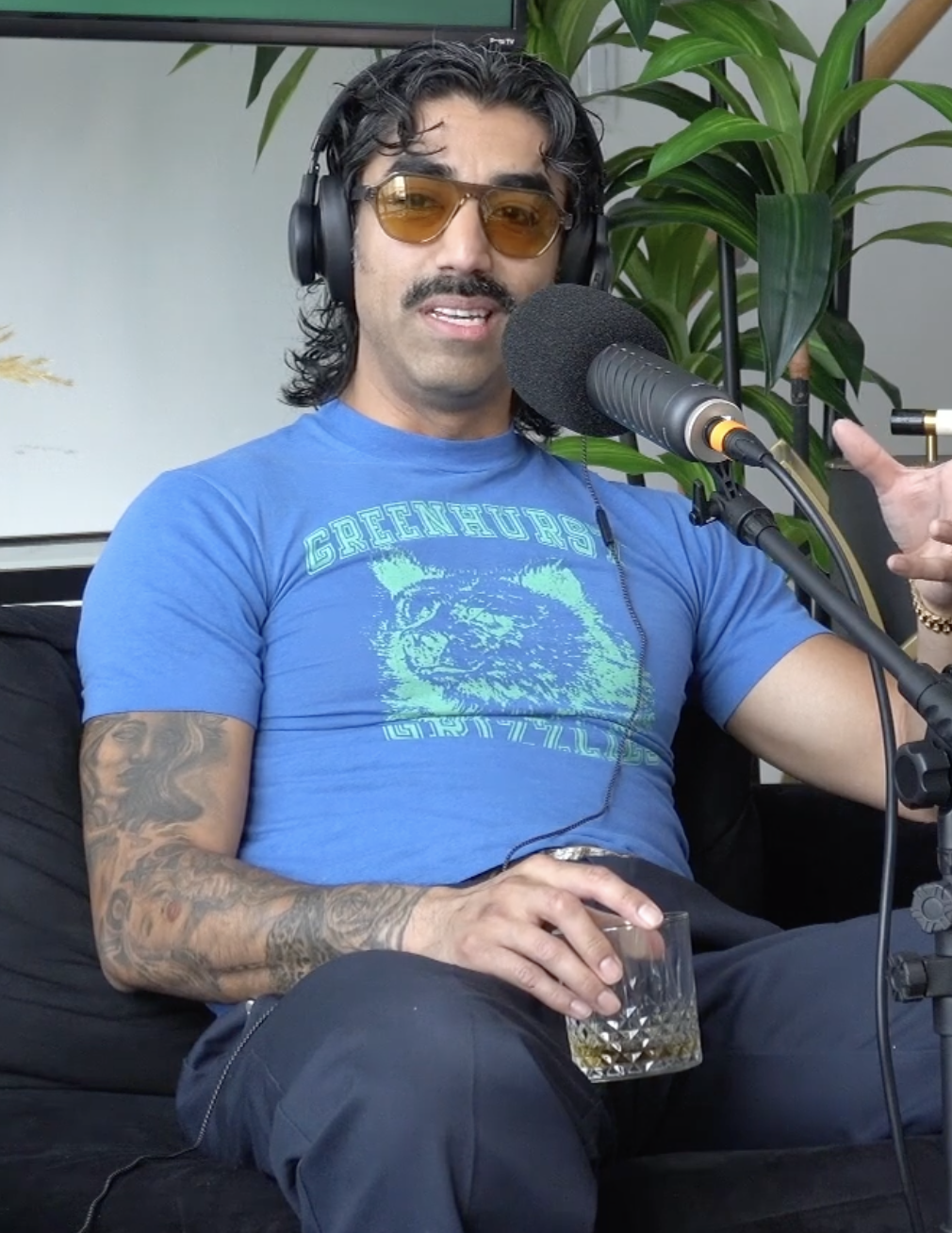
- Ape Drums in 2024

Background information
- Born: Eric Alberto-Lopez; June 28, 1990 (age 35); Houston, Texas, U.S.
- Genres: Dancehall; moombahton; electronic
- Occupations: Producer; DJ
- Instruments: Synthesizer; DAW; sampler
- Years active: 2014–present
- Labels: Club Cartel; Vision Sound; Fool's Gold; Owsla; Mad Decent
- Member of: Major Lazer

Eric Alberto-Lopez (born June 28, 1990), known professionally as Ape Drums, is a Mexican-American DJ and record producer. Ape Drums is known for fusing electronic dance music with Caribbean sounds, described by Thump as "modern dancehall music". He is also one third of the DJ/production trio Major Lazer, replacing Jillionaire in the summer of 2019.

== Career ==
His debut single "Bashment" was released in 2014 on Slow Roast Records. His Major Lazer collaboration, "The Way We Do This" (a reimagining of the classic "Bookshelf Riddim"), was played at festivals worldwide by the group, before it was finally released in 2016 on Ape Drums' debut EP for Mad Decent. Later in 2016, Ape Drums released "LFUTP", featuring the up-and-coming Philadelphia rapper Lil Uzi Vert, on Fool's Gold Records.

Ape Drums gained a new level of international fame when his single "Mutant Brain" was used in the 2016 Kenzo world ad campaign, directed by Spike Jonze and starring Margaret Qualley. The single was then quickly signed and released by Interscope Records.

On June 1, 2019, at the Governors Ball Music Festival, it was officially announced that Ape Drums would replace Jillionaire as the new member of Major Lazer. The trio now consists of founding member Diplo, Walshy Fire and Ape Drums.

== Discography ==
=== Extended plays ===
Title	Details
Jungle Rock	Released: October 18, 2011; Label: Club Cartel Records; Formats: CD, digital download
Soundboy	Released: May 7, 2021; Label: Vision Sound / Mad Decent; Formats: digital download

=== Singles ===
==== As artist ====
Year	Title	Label
2012	Lion	Believe Digital
2012	Turn It Up Again	Cherry Drop Records
2012	Casio	Believe Digital
2013	Worl'boss ft. Vybz Kartel	Universal Music Group
2014	Bashment	Slow Roast Records
2015	The Symphony	Believe Digital
2016	Magic City	Seed
2017	Ghost	Spinnin' Records
2017	Deva ft. Suku	Mad Decent
2017	CHUPACABRA (with Carnage)	Heavyweight Records
2018	Go Crazy ft. Dougie F	Mad Decent
2018	LFUTP ft. Rizzoo Rizzoo & Lil Uzi Vert	Universal Music Group
2018	Shellz ft. Denzel Curry & Frizzo	Spinnin' Records
2018	The Way We Do This ft. Major Lazer & Busy Signal	Mad Decent
2019	Bed Squeak ft. Nicky Da B (with Wuki)	Insomniac Records / Mad Decent
2020	Delete ft. Beam	Vision Sound / Mad Decent
2021	Mek Money (with Silent Addy) ft. Projexx	Vision Sound / Mad Decent
2021	BF Killa ft. Toian & Projexx	Vision Sound / Mad Decent
2023	Discoteca (with Dev) ft. NEZ	Dev

==== As feature artist ====
Year	Title	Label
2015	Tropkillaz "Wine Yuh Back" (ft. Ape Drums & Suku)	Elemess
2017	Pitbull 'Can't Have' ft. Steven A. Clark & Ape Drums	RCA Records
2021	ceR alswO "Make Your Girl Go" (ft. Good Things Ahead & Ape Drums)	Warner Music Austria

=== Remixes ===
Year	Title
2013	M.I.A 'Bring the Noize' (Ape Drums Remix)
2014	Skrillex & Kill The Noise 'Recess' (Ape Drums Remix) ft. Fatman Scoop and Michael Angelakos
2014	Yellow Claw 'Dancehall Soldier' (Ape Drums Remix) ft. Beenie Man
2014	Autoerotique 'LZR BASS' (Ape Drums Remix)
2014	Tony Matterhorn Duttiest Wine (Ape Drums & Diplo Remix)
2014	Indian Summer 'Loveweights (Ape Drums Remix)
2015	Steven A. Clark 'Can't Have' (Ape Drums Remix)
2015	Major Lazer 'Jet Blue Jet' (Ape Drums Remix)
2016	P-Money & Gappy Ranks 'Baddest' (Ape Drums Remix)
2016	Yellow Claw 'Nightmare' ft. Pusha T & Barrington Levy (Ape Drums Remix)
2017	Machel Montano & Sean Paul 'One Wine' ft. Major Lazer (Ape Drums Remix)
2018	AlunaGeorge 'Mean What I Mean' (Ape Drums Remix)
2018	Dillon Francis We The Funk ft. Fuego (Ape Drums Remix)
2018	BURNS 'Hands On Me' (Ape Drums Remix) ft. Maluma & Rae Sremmurd
2020	Britney Spears 'Mood Ring' (Ape Drums Remix)
