= Steven A. Clark =

American singer-songwriter

- Also known as: Steve Clark; Steven Clark
- Born: Little Rock, Arkansas, United States
- Origin: Miami, Florida, United States
- Genres: Pop; R&B
- Occupation: Singer-songwriter
- Years active: 2011–present
- Labels: Secretly Canadian
- Website: http://www.stevenaclark.com

Steven A. Clark is an American singer-songwriter from Miami, Florida. Born in Little Rock, Arkansas, he signed with Secretly Canadian in 2014.

== Career ==
=== Stripes ===
After moving from Fayetteville, North Carolina, fresh from High Point University, creative R&B crooner Steven A. Clark moved to Miami, Florida to explore his musical ambitions that eventually created this 8-song LP Stripes. The album is a "movement towards a distinctive and immersive preview of R&B, reminiscent of other innovative R&B artists Frank Ocean and The Weeknd."

=== LATE ===
LATE, Clark's debut release after signing with Secretly Canadian, is a 3-song EP, mostly self written and self-produced. The album was just the beginning for Clark, with soul-searching stories told throughout each track in a generous pop/R&B vision. The album includes track "The Lonely Roller," the title of his highly anticipated subsequently released full-length album on Secretly Canadian.

=== The Lonely Roller ===
Following the success of his 3 track EP LATE, Clark released his first full-length album on the Secretly Canadian roster, The Lonely Roller in 2015. An intimate, indie-pop-R&B record, the album includes tracks that incorporate both personal and emotional stories with fresh rhythms and pulsing synthesizers. The album shows the struggles in his musical journey and promises creative potential in a new wave of honest, verse R&B. Zane Lowe from Beats 1 and SPIN magazine have praised the album, specifically tracks "Not You," "Can't Have," and "Just Ride," and the stories they tell. Clark is currently on tour with Sinkane promoting his new album.

== Musical style ==
Steven A. Clark's musical style has been described as a mix of indie-pop and intimate, verse R&B. Noisey describes track "Not You" off of his debut LP with Secretly Canadian as "relaxed and effortless, sounding similar to Frank Ocean-meets-pop, while channeling some universal themes of love lost." Clark himself calls himself a "flawed character." The Lonely Roller tells emotional, tragic love stories from the artist's own personal life, and is a creative, interesting new force in the world of R&B and indie pop.

== Discography ==
=== Studio albums ===
- Stripes (2011)
- Late (2014)
- The Lonely Roller (2015)
- Where Neon Goes To Die (2018)
- Hypervigilant (2019)

=== Guest appearances ===
List of non-single guest appearances, with other performing artists, showing year released and album name
Title	Year	Artist(s)	Album
"Like Me"	2013	Denzel Curry	Nostalgic 64
"Can't Have"	2017	Pitbull, Ape Drums	Climate Change
"Killer"	2018	Boys Noize	Non-album single
