= Chromeo discography =

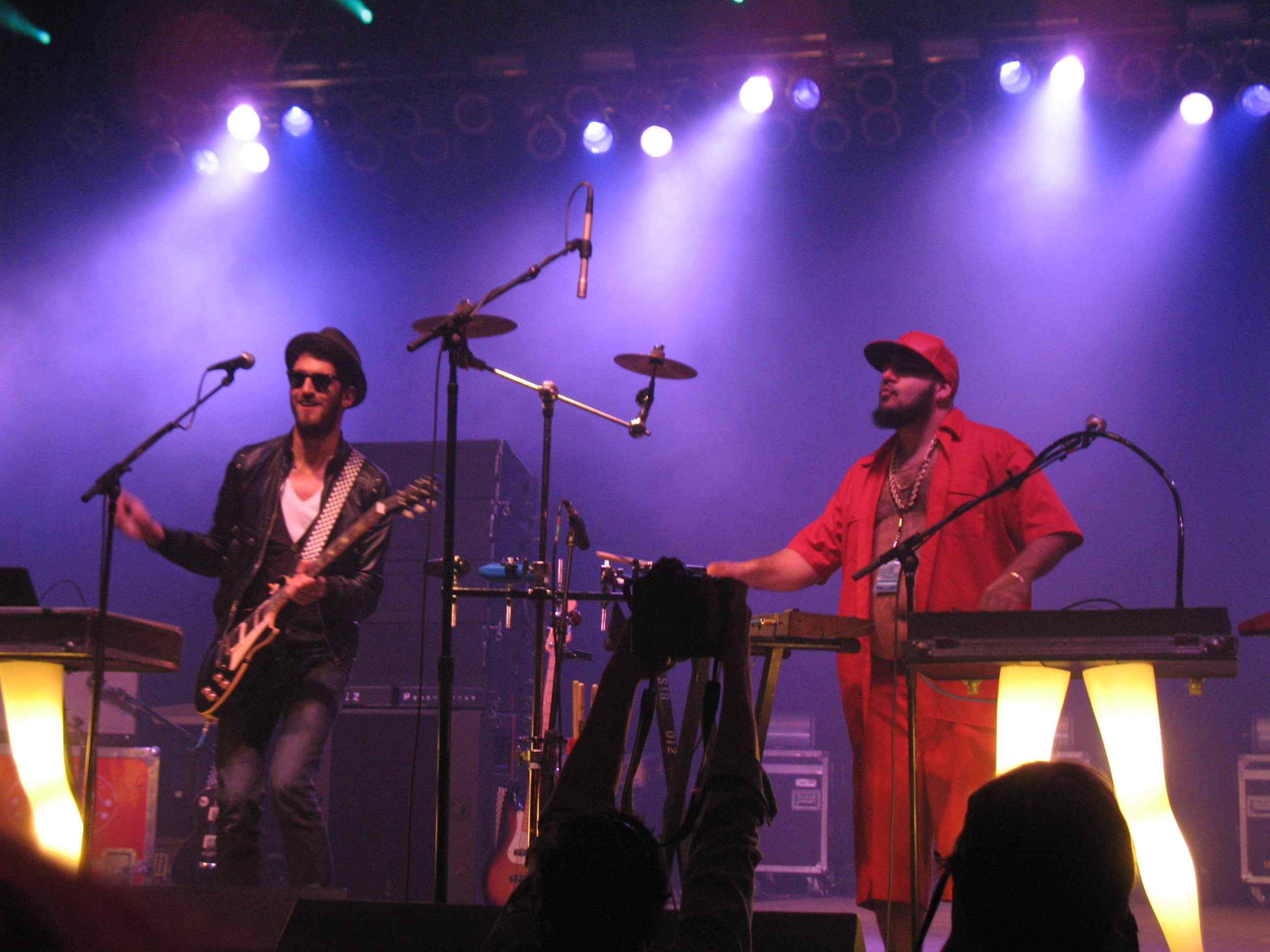
- Chromeo performing at the Bonnaroo Music Festival in June 2008
- Studio albums: 6
- EPs: 3
- Live albums: 1
- Singles: 36
- Music videos: 23
- Mix albums: 3

French-Canadian electro-funk duo Chromeo has released six studio albums, three mix albums, three extended plays, 36 singles (including eight as a featured artist) and 23 music videos.

== Albums ==
=== Studio albums ===
List of studio albums, with selected chart positions
| Title | Details | Peak chart positions | | | | | | | | | Sales |
| Title | Details | CAN | AUS | BEL (FL) | FRA | IRE | SWI | UK | US | US Dance | Sales |
|---|---|---|---|---|---|---|---|---|---|---|---|
| She's in Control | Released: February 17, 2004; Label: Turbo, Vice; Formats: CD, LP, digital download | — | — | — | — | — | — | — | — | — | |
| Fancy Footwork | Released: May 8, 2007; Label: Turbo, Last Gang; Formats: CD, LP, digital download | — | — | — | — | — | — | — | — | 11 | |
| Business Casual | Released: September 14, 2010; Label: Last Gang, Turbo; Formats: CD, LP, digital download | 44 | — | — | — | — | — | 151 | 70 | 4 | |
| White Women | Released: May 12, 2014; Label: Last Gang; Formats: CD, LP, digital download | 6 | 50 | 82 | 182 | 70 | 49 | 42 | 11 | 1 | CAN: 3,500; US: 16,000; UK: 1,940 |
| Head Over Heels | Released: June 15, 2018; Label: Big Beat, Atlantic; Formats: CD, LP, cassette, digital download | 74 | — | 142 | 189 | — | 62 | — | 91 | 1 | |
| Adult Contemporary | Released: February 16, 2024; Label: BMG; Formats: CD, LP, Digital download, streaming | — | — | — | — | — | — | — | — | 21 | |
"—" denotes a recording that did not chart or was not released in that territory.

=== Compilation albums ===
| Title | Details |
|---|---|
| Bend the Rules (Deluxe) | Released: May 7, 2021; Label: Juilet, Last Gang; Formats: Digital download |

=== Live albums ===
| Title | Details |
|---|---|
| Date Night: Chromeo Live! | Released: June 25, 2021; Label: Last Gang Records, eOne; Formats: LP, Digital download |

=== Mix albums ===
| Title | Details |
|---|---|
| Chromeo Presents Un Joli Mix pour Toi | Released: September 13, 2005; Label: Eskimo; Formats: CD, LP |
| Ce Soir on Danse! | Released: September 5, 2006; Label: Disque Primeur; Format: CD |
| DJ-Kicks: Chromeo | Released: September 28, 2009; Label: Studio !K7; Formats: CD, digital download |

== Extended plays ==
List of extended plays, with selected chart positions
| Title | Album details | Peak chart positions | |
| Title | Album details | US Cur. | US Dance |
|---|---|---|---|
| iTunes Live from Montreal | Released: September 14, 2010; Label: Atlantic; Format: Digital download | — | — |
| Quarantine Casanova | Released: June 12, 2020; Label: Atlantic; Format: Digital download | 48 | 24 |
| Bend the Rules | Released: December 2, 2020; Label: Juilet, Last Gang; Format: Digital download | — | — |

== Singles ==
=== As lead artist ===
List of singles as lead artist, with selected chart positions, showing year released and album name
| Title | Year | Peak chart positions | | | | | | | | | | Sales | Certifications | Album |
| Title | Year | CAN | CAN CHR | CAN HAC | BEL (FL) Tip | BEL (WA) Tip | HUN | MEX Ing. | SWE | UK | US Dance | Sales | Certifications | Album |
|---|---|---|---|---|---|---|---|---|---|---|---|---|---|---|
| "You're So Gangsta" | 2002 | — | — | — | — | — | — | — | — | — | — | | | She's in Control |
| "Destination: Overdrive" | 2003 | — | — | — | — | — | — | — | — | — | — | | | She's in Control |
| "Needy Girl" | 2004 | — | — | — | — | — | — | — | 29 | 189 | — | | | She's in Control |
| "Me & My Man" | 2004 | — | — | — | — | — | — | — | — | — | — | | | She's in Control |
| "Rage!" | 2005 | — | — | — | — | — | — | — | — | — | — | | | She's in Control |
| "Fancy Footwork" | 2007 | — | — | — | — | — | — | — | — | 185 | — (Note: "Fancy Footwork" did not enter the Billboard Dance/Electronic Songs chart, but peaked at number 26 on the Dance/Electronic Digital Song Sales chart.) | | | Fancy Footwork |
| "Tenderoni" | 2007 | — | — | — | — | — | — | — | — | — | — | | | Fancy Footwork |
| "Bonafied Lovin" | 2007 | — | — | — | — | — | — | — | — | — | — | | | Fancy Footwork |
| "I Can't Tell You Why" | 2009 | — | — | — | — | — | — | — | — | — | — | | | DJ-Kicks: Chromeo |
| "Night by Night" | 2009 | — | — | — | — | — | — | — | — | — | — (Note: "Night by Night" did not enter the Billboard Dance/Electronic Songs chart, but peaked at number 45 on the Dance/Electronic Digital Song Sales chart.) | | | Business Casual |
| "Don't Turn the Lights On" | 2010 | — | — | — | — | — | — | — | — | — | — (Note: "Don't Turn the Lights On" did not enter the Billboard Dance/Electronic Songs chart, but peaked at number 42 on the Dance/Electronic Digital Song Sales chart.) | | | Business Casual |
| "Hot Mess" | 2011 | — | — | 35 | — | 38 | — | — | — | — | — (Note: "Hot Mess" did not enter the Billboard Dance/Electronic Songs chart, but peaked at number four on the Dance Singles Sales chart.) | | | Business Casual |
| "When the Night Falls" (featuring Solange Knowles) | 2011 | — | — | — | — | — | — | — | — | — | — | | | Business Casual |
| "Over Your Shoulder" | 2013 | — | — | — | — | — | — | — | — | — | — | | | White Women |
| "Come Alive" (featuring Toro y Moi) | 2014 | — | 45 | — | 34 | — | — | — | — | — | 35 | | | White Women |
| "Sexy Socialite" | 2014 | — | — | — | — | — | — | — | — | — | — | | | White Women |
| "Jealous (I Ain't with It)" | 2014 | 12 | 5 | 5 | 5 | 4 | 2 | — | — | 172 | 12 | CAN: 85,000 | MC: Gold | White Women |
| "Old 45s" | 2015 | — | — | — | — | — | — | 43 | — | — | — | | | White Women |
| "Juice" | 2017 | — | — | — | — | — | — | — | — | — | 33 | | | Head Over Heels |
| "Bedroom Calling" (featuring The-Dream) | 2018 | — | — | — | — | — | — | — | — | — | — | | | Head Over Heels |
| "Must've Been" (featuring DRAM) | 2018 | — | 47 | — | — | — | — | — | — | — | 44 | | | Head Over Heels |
| "Bad Decision" | 2018 | — | — | — | — | — | — | — | — | — | — | | | Head Over Heels |
| "Don't Sleep" (featuring French Montana and Stefflon Don) | 2018 | — | — | — | — | 9 | — | — | — | — | — | | | Head Over Heels |
| "Clorox Wipe" | 2020 | — | — | — | — | — | — | — | — | — | 50 | | | Quarantine Casanova |
| "Clean Up Your Own Backyard" | 2021 | — | — | — | — | — | — | — | — | — | — | | | Non-album single |
| "Cabin Fever" | 2021 | — | — | — | — | — | — | — | — | — | — | | | Quarantine Casanova |
| "6 Feet Away" | 2021 | — | — | — | — | — | — | — | — | — | — | | | Quarantine Casanova |
| "Stay in Bed (And Do Nothing)" | 2021 | — | — | — | — | — | — | — | — | — | — | | | Quarantine Casanova |
| "Bend the Rules" (with Anomalie and Mndsgn) | 2021 | — | — | — | — | — | — | — | — | — | — | | | Bend the Rules |
| "Blutooth/Enough 4 U" | 2022 | — | — | — | — | — | — | — | — | — | — | | | Non-album singles |
| "Raspberry Blush" | 2022 | — | — | — | — | — | — | — | — | — | — | | | Non-album singles |
| "Words with You" | 2023 | — | — | — | — | — | — | — | — | — | — | | | Adult Contemporary |
| "Replacements" (featuring La Roux) | 2023 | — | — | — | — | — | — | — | — | — | — | | | Adult Contemporary |
| "(I Don't Need a) New Girl" | 2023 | — | — | — | — | — | — | — | — | — | — | | | Adult Contemporary |
| "Personal Effects" | 2023 | — | — | — | — | — | — | — | — | — | — | | | Adult Contemporary |
| "Lost and Found" | 2024 | — | — | — | — | — | — | — | — | — | — | | | Adult Contemporary |
| "Fancy Footwork" (with Chris Lorenzo) | 2026 | — | — | — | — | — | — | — | — | 51 | 13 | | | Non-album single |
"—" denotes a recording that did not chart or was not released in that territory.

=== As featured artist ===
List of singles as featured artist, with selected chart positions, showing year released and album name
| Title | Year | Peak chart positions | Album |
| Title | Year | US Pop | Album |
|---|---|---|---|
| "I Am Somebody" (DJ Mehdi featuring Chromeo) | 2006 | — | Lucky Boy |
| "Legs" (Chuck Inglish featuring Chromeo) | 2014 | — | Convertibles |
| "Future Is Mine" (DJ Cassidy featuring Chromeo) | 2015 | — | Paradise Royale |
| "Go With It" (Oliver featuring Chromeo) | 2017 | — | Full Circle |
| "No Price" (Slam Dunk'd featuring Chromeo and Al-P) | 2018 | — | Non-album single |
| "Checklist" (Max featuring Chromeo) | 2019 | 36 | Colour Vision |
| "J.A.M. (Just a Minute)" (Cory Wong featuring Chromeo) | 2022 | — | Power Station |
| "Heartbreaker" (Purple Disco Machine featuring Chromeo) | 2024 | — | Non-album single |

== Guest appearances ==
List of non-single guest appearances, with other performing artists, showing year released and album name
| Title | Year | Other artist(s) | Album |
|---|---|---|---|
| "Chrome Knight" | 2008 | Surkin | Next of Kin: Mark II |
| "Lies" | 2015 | Dillon Francis | This Mixtape Is Fire |
| "Luv You Right" | 2026 | BNYX, Immanuel Wilkins | Genesis FM |

== Remixes ==
List of remixes produced by Chromeo for other artists, showing year released
| Title | Year | Artist |
|---|---|---|
| "Future" | 2004 | Cut Copy |
| "Breathe" | 2006 | Lenny Kravitz |
| "Sea Lion Woman" | 2007 | Feist |
| "Cross the Dancefloor" | 2008 | Treasure Fingers |
| "The Kids Don't Stand a Chance" | 2008 | Vampire Weekend |
| "What You Need" | 2010 | Tiga |
| "Superstar" | 2010 | Aeroplane |
| "A Long Time" | 2011 | Mayer Hawthorne |
| "What You Want" | 2013 | Boys Noize |
| "Love Is in Control (Finger on the Trigger)" | 2013 | Donna Summer |
| "Green Light" | 2017 | Lorde |
| "Wait" | 2018 | Maroon 5 |
| "Lose Your Love" | 2020 | Dirty Projectors |
| "Clean Up Your Own Backyard" | 2021 | Elvis Presley |
| "10 Years" | 2021 | Daði & Gagnamagnið |
| "Get a Guitar" | 2023 | Riize |

== Music videos ==
List of music videos, showing year released and directors
| Title | Year | Director(s) |
|---|---|---|
| "Needy Girl" | 2004 | Tomorrow's Brightest Minds |
| "Rage!" | 2005 | Moh Azima |
| "I Am Somebody" (DJ Mehdi featuring Chromeo) | 2006 | So Me |
| "Tenderoni" | 2007 | Jérémie Rozan and Martial Schmeltz |
| "Bonafied Lovin" | 2007 | Nima Nourizadeh |
| "Fancy Footwork" | 2008 | Ben Levine |
| "Momma's Boy" | 2008 | Stéphane Manel |
| "Night by Night" | 2009 | Jérémie Rozan |
| "Don't Turn the Lights On" | 2010 | Keith Schofield |
| "Hot Mess" | 2010 | Jérémie Rozan |
| "When the Night Falls" | 2011 | DANIELS |
| "Come Alive" (featuring Toro y Moi) | 2014 | Alex Southam |
| "Jealous (I Ain't with It)" | 2014 | Ryan Hope |
| "Legs" (Chuck Inglish featuring Chromeo) | 2014 | Andreis Costa |
| "Old 45's" | 2014 | Dugan O'Neal |
| "Juice" | 2017 | David Wilson |
| "Must've Been" (featuring DRAM) | 2018 | Dugan O'Neal |
| "Don't Sleep" (featuring French Montana and Stefflon Don) | 2018 | Allie Avital |
| "Clorox Wipe" | 2020 | Patrick Jean |
| "(I Don't Need a) New Girl" | 2023 | Spencer Ford |
| "Personal Effects" | 2023 | Spencer Ford |
| "Lost and Found" | 2024 | Spencer Ford |
| "Heartbreaker" (Purple Disco Machine featuring Chromeo) | 2024 | Spencer Ford |
