= David Macklovitch =

Canadian musician (born 1978)

- دافيد ماكلوفيتش
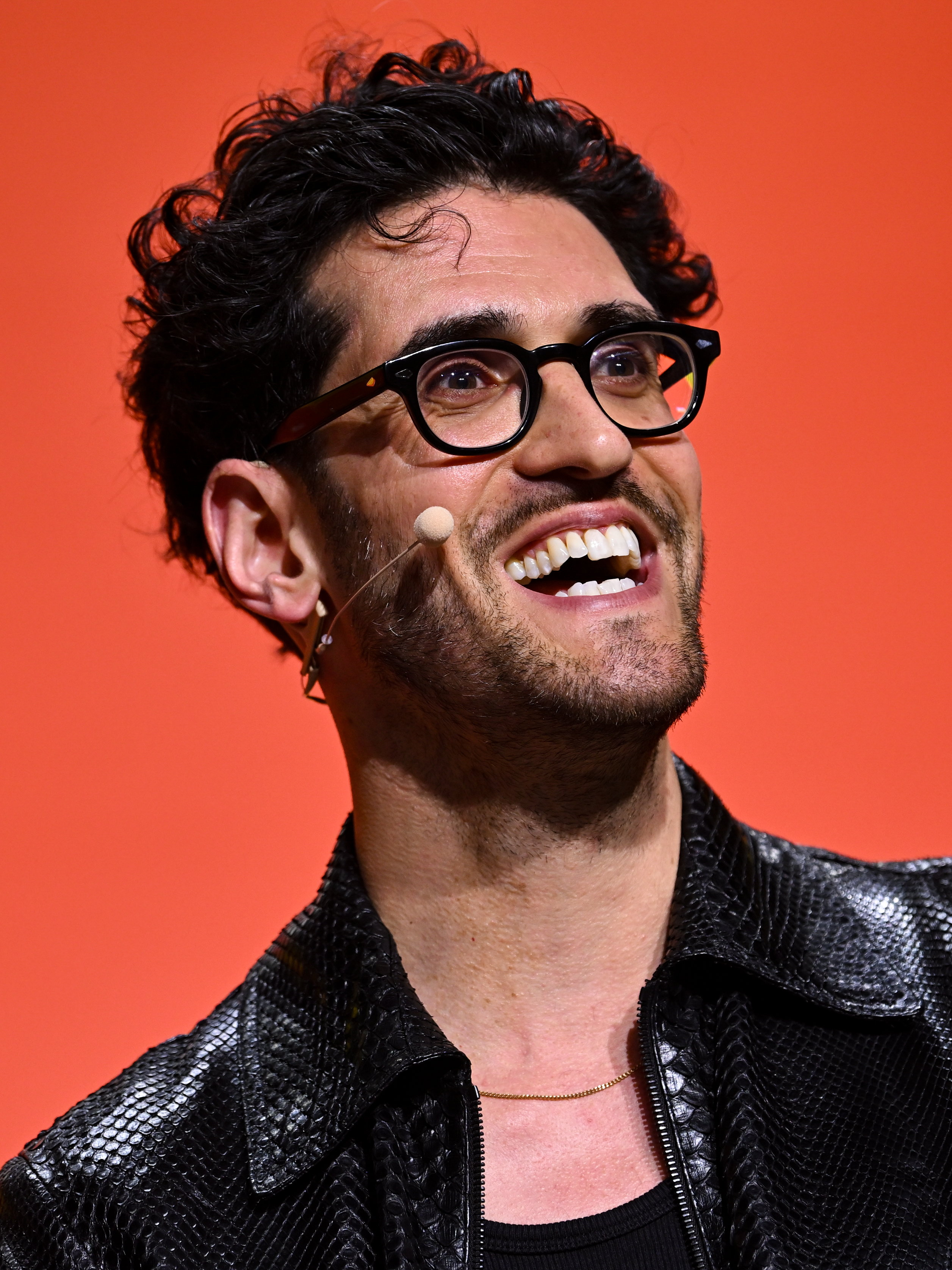
- Macklovitch in 2024
- Born: David Macklovitch; 7 June 1978 (age 48); Montreal, Quebec, Canada
- Other name: Dave 1
- Education: Barnard College; Columbia University
- Occupations: Musician; producer; songwriter; Singer; composer; actor
- Years active: 2002–present
- Spouse: Atlanta de Cadenet (m. 2025)
- Musical career
- Genres: Electro-funk; nu-disco; synth-pop; dance-rock
- Instruments: Electric guitar; Synthesizer
- Labels: Juliet Records; Turbo; Vice; Back Yard; V2; Modular; Last Gang; Big Beat; Atlantic; Parlophone
- Member of: Chromeo

David Macklovitch (Arabic: دافيد ماكلوفيتش; born 7 June 1978), known professionally as Dave 1, is a Canadian-Moroccan musician and singer. He is one of the two members of Canadian electronic music duo Chromeo along with Patrick Gemayel.

== Early and personal life ==
Macklovitch was born in Montreal, Quebec, into a family of French and Moroccan Jewish descent. He is the older brother of DJ and producer Alain Macklovitch, also known as A-Trak. Their relationship has been a constant throughout his career; they frequently collaborate on musical projects and maintain a joint presence in the electronic music scene.

In October 2019, Macklovitch announced his engagement to Atlanta de Cadenet, daughter of British musician John Taylor and photographer Amanda de Cadenet. The couple were married at the Brooklyn Courthouse on 18 September 2025.

== Discography ==
=== Albums ===
==== As Chromeo ====
- She's in Control (2004)
- Fancy Footwork (2007)
- Business Casual (2010)
- White Women (2014)
- Head over Heels (2018)
- Quarantine Casanova (2020)
- Adult Contemporary (2024)

== Filmography ==
=== Film ===
| Year | Title | Role | Notes |
|---|---|---|---|
| 2014 | 22 Jump Street | Fictionalized version of himself | |
| 2015 | The D Train | Himself (Cameo) | |
| 2016 | Barbershop: The Next Cut | Himself | |
| 2019 | Jexi | Himself and a special appearance alongside his partner, P-Thugg. | |

=== Television ===
| Year | Title | Role | Notes |
|---|---|---|---|
| 2011 | Entourage | Himself (Cameo) | Episode: "The Big Bang" |
| 2017–2018 | Neo Yokio | Himself | Voice |
