= Vaughn Oliver =

Canadian record producer (born 1995)

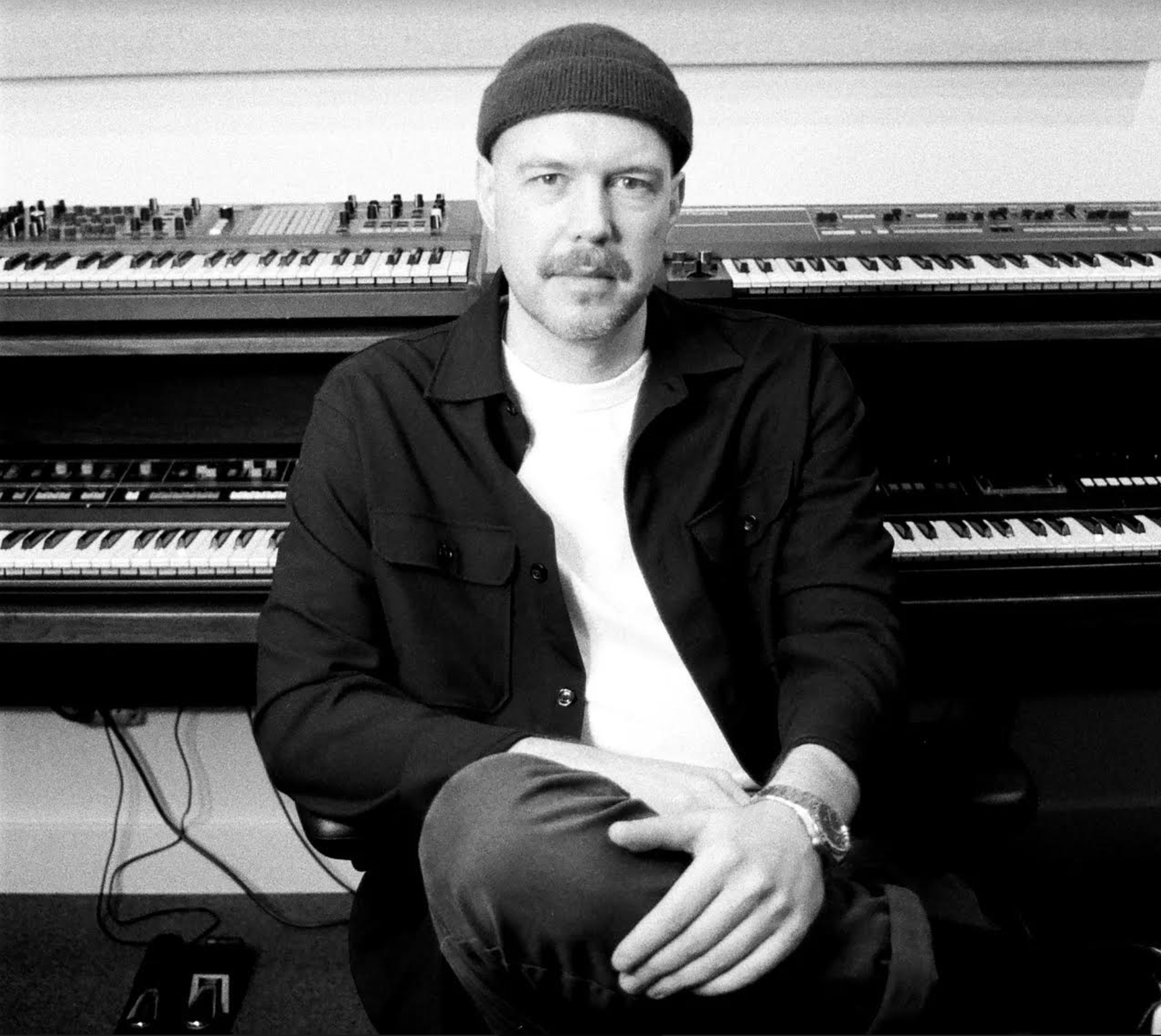
- Oliver in 2024

Background information
- Also known as: U-Tern
- Born: Vaughn Richard Oliver
- Origin: Vancouver, Canada
- Genres: Electronic; electro house; nu disco; electropop
- Occupations: DJ; record producer; songwriter
- Years active: 2010–present
- Labels: Interscope; Fool's Gold
- Member of: Oliver

Vaughn Richard Oliver is a Canadian record producer, sound designer, disc jockey (DJ), and audio engineer. He was one half of the musical duo Oliver with fellow disc jockey Oliver Goldstein.

== Career ==
Vaughn Richard Oliver (also known as U-Tern), originally from Canada, was a hip-hop and scratch DJ in the 1990s. Oliver, upon moving to Vancouver, started DJing in clubs and radio shows, while Goldstein played in bands and made beats in the studio. While living separately by distance, Oliver and Oliver Goldstein communicated by Skype and produced music by sending each other parts via the internet.

Oliver launched his duo's debut studio album, titled Full Circle, which featured collaborations with Chromeo, MNDR, Sam Sparro, De La Soul and Yelle, was released via Interscope Records on August 25, 2017, alongside singles titled "Heart Attack" featuring De La Soul, "Electrify" and "Chemicals". The song "Electrify" has received over 1.8 million streams on Spotify and was included in the official soundtrack of EA Sports' FIFA 17.

In the years before 2014, Oliver released the extended plays titled Dirty Talk (2012), Mechanical (2013), and Light Years Away (2014). In an interview, Oliver noted his dream collaborations to be Prince, Quincy Jones, and Daft Punk.

A remix EP of Mechanical was released, featuring remixes from Tchami, Dillon Francis, Values, and Nom De Strip. Their song "MYB" was featured on Annie Mac's BBC Radio 1 show. Earlier in 2017, they featured on the Leon Else song "The City Don't Care", which was released via What Are We Doing/Interscope Records.

On October 23, 2019, Oliver announced on their official Twitter account that no plans were set for any future albums/tours and that they (Goldstein and he) hadn't worked together on music for over a year, citing professional issues. Oliver intends to sporadically release under the Oliver name, but states that his focus has been on producing and sound engineering for other artists.

After 2019, he made the switch to mainly producing for artists including Latto, Kim Petras, Nicki Minaj, and Megan Thee Stallion.

In 2021, Oliver handled the production of Big Energy, a single by Latto. "Big Energy" has gone 2 x platinum and earned Latto her first top 10 hit on the US Billboard Hot 100, peaking at number three in April 2022. "Big Energy" also reached #1 on U.S. Rhythmic chart and #1 on Top 20.

Oliver also made contributions to 9 Kim Petras songs from the album Problematique and 3 songs from the album Feed the Beast.

Oliver has worked with Nicki Minaj, Megan Thee Stallion, Katy Perry, Latto, Kim Petras, Kylie Minogue, Khalid, Poppy, Slayyyter, Yelle, Remi Wolf, Chromeo, Lu Kala, as a producer and songwriter, and frequent collaborators include Dr. Luke, Tobias Wincorn, Jesse St John, Malibu Babie, LunchMoney Lewis, KBeaZy, Ryland Blackinton, Yung Bae, Nico Stadi, Blake Straus, and Chloe Angelides.

== Artistry ==
Oliver is established in the producer community through Splice, where his Power Tools sample packs have become one of the platform's most downloaded brands. He has released three main packs with a total of around 3,000 sounds. Oliver's Power Tools sample packs have been used by producers for artists including Doja Cat, Dua Lipa, SZA, Justin Timberlake, Kygo, Sabrina Carpenter, The Weeknd, and Adele, among others.

== Discography ==
=== Studio albums ===
Year	Artist	Album
2017	Oliver	Full Circle

=== Extended plays ===
Year	Artist	Album
2018	Oliver	Inner Circle: Remixes & Rarities
2014	Oliver	Light Years Away
2013	Oliver	Mechanical
2012	Oliver	Dirty Talk

=== Singles ===
Year	Artist	Song
2017	Leon Else (featuring Oliver)	"The City Don't Care"
2017	Oliver (featuring De La Soul)	"Heart Attack"
2017	Oliver (featuring MNDR)	"Chemicals"
2013	Oliver, Tchami	"Myb - Tchami Remix"
2016	Oliver (featuring Scott Mellis)	"Electrify"

== Production discography ==
=== Remixes ===
Year	Artist	Song
2022	Kavinsky	"Renegade" (Oliver Remix)
2018	Beck	"Up All Night" (Oliver Remix)
2017	Collapsing Scenery	"Straight World" (Oliver Mix)
2017	Tove Lo	“Disco Tits” (Oliver Remix)
2017	The Knocks & Captain Cuts	"House Party" (Oliver Disco Mixx)
2017	Grey featuring Bahari	"I Miss You" (Oliver Remix)
2016	Fred Falke featuring Elohim & Mansions on the Moon	"It's A Memory" (Oliver Remix)
2016	Leon Else	"Dance" (Oliver Remix)
2015	Breakbot	"One Out Of Two" (Oliver Remix)
2015	Madeon featuring Kyan	"You're On" (Oliver Remix)
2015	Club Cheval	"From the Basement to the Roof" (Oliver Remix)
2015	Jack Ü featuring AlunaGeorge	"To Ü" (Oliver Remix)
2015	BØRNS	"Electric Love" (Oliver Remix)
2014	Boys Noize featuring Siriusmo	"Conchord" (Oliver Remix)
2014	Big Data	"Dangerous (ft. Joywave)“ (Oliver Remix)
2013	Kris Menace (featuring Black Hills)	"Waiting For You" (Oliver Remix)
2013	Blondie	"Heart Of Glass" (Oliver & Thee Mike B Remix)
2013	Mayer Hawthorne	"Her Favorite Song" (Oliver Remix)
2013	Bonnie McKee	"American Girl" (Oliver Remix)
2013	Gigamesh	"Enjoy" (Oliver Remix)
2013	Donna Summer	"Love Is In Control (Finger On The Trigger)" [Chromeo & Oliver Remix]
2012	Childish Gambino	“Heartbeat” (Oliver Remix)
2012	Housse de Racket	"Roman" (Oliver Remix)
2012	Smalltown DJs featuring Alanna Stuart	"Love Decoy" (Oliver Remix)
2012	Foster The People	"Don't Stop" (Oliver Remix)
2012	Punks Jump Up	"Mr. Overtime" (Oliver Remix)
2012	Live Element	"Be Free" (Oliver Remix)
2012	Black Van	"Inside" (Oliver Remix)
2012	Aeroplane	"We Can't Fly" (Oliver Remix)
2011	Don Diablo (featuring Dragonette)	"Animale"(Oliver Remix)
2011	Chromeo	"Hot Mess" (Oliver Remix)
2011	Juan Atkins	"Dayshift" (Oliver's Nightshift Remix)
2011	Penguin Prison	"Fair Warning" (Oliver Remix)
2011	Britney Spears	"I Wanna Go" (Oliver Remix)
2011	Sneaky Sound System	"Big" (Oliver Remix)

=== Produced and co-written songs ===
Year	Song	Artist	Album
2026	"Time After Time"	Ejae	—N/a
2026	"In My Hands"	Meovv	Bite Now
2024	"Criminal"	Lu Kala	No Tears on This Ride
2024	"Who's Gonna"	Lu Kala	No Tears on This Ride
2024	“Please U”	Usher	—N/a
2024	“Diamonds”	Kylie Minogue	Tension II
2024	“Dance to the Music”	Kylie Minogue	Tension II
2023	"Hotter Now"	Lu Kala	No Tears on This Ride
2023	"Out of Time"	Slayyyter	Starfucker
2023	"Purrr"	Slayyyter	Starfucker
2023	"Hit It From The Back"	Kim Petras	Feed the Beast
2023	"Problématique"	Kim Petras	Feed the Beast
2023	"Revelations"	Kim Petras	Feed the Beast
2023	“Dirty Things”	Kim Petras	Feed the Beast
2023	"All She Wants"	Kim Petras	Feed the Beast
2023	"Sex Talk"	Kim Petras	Feed the Beast
2023	"Je T'Adore"	Kim Petras	Feed the Beast
2023	“Born Again“	Kim Petras	Feed the Beast
2023	“Deeper“	Kim Petras	Feed the Beast
2023	“Something About You“	Kim Petras	Feed the Beast
2023	“Confession“	Kim Petras	Feed the Beast
2023	“Love Ya Leave ya“	Kim Petras	Feed the Beast
2023	"Coconuts"	Kim Petras	Feed the Beast
2023	"Softest Touch"	Khalid	—N/a
2023	"Voices (feat. Kylie Minogue)"	Jake Shears	Last Man Dancing
2023	“Too Much Music”	Jake Shears	Last Man Dancing
2022	"Super Freaky Girl"	Nicki Minaj	—N/a
2022	"Show Me the Way 2 Love“	NVDES	Vibe Mountain Love
2022	“Anti Cigarettes Love“	NVDES	Vibe Mountain Love
2022	Big Energy	Latto	777
2022	"Big Energy (feat. DJ Khaled) - Remix"	Latto	777
2022	"Her"	Megan Thee Stallion	—N/a
2022	"Passenger"	Choices, Oliver, Ryland Blackinton	—N/a
2022	“Right Here”	Kiinjo, Oliver	—N/a
2022	“Lundi”	Kiinjo, Oliver	—N/a
2022	“Dipshits”	Cam'ron, A-Trak, Juelz Santana, Damon Dash	—N/a
2021	“Midnight In Tokyo (feat. Little Glee Monster)”	Pentatonix, Little Glee Monster	—N/a
2021	“LA On Fire”	NYIKO	—N/a
2020	“ova U”	Shae Jacobs	—N/a
2020	“Purple Flames”	NVDES	—N/a
2020	“Nvdity Worldwide”	NVDES, Khadyak	—N/a
2020	“Global”	NVDES, Khadyak	—N/a
2020	"Future Starts Now"	Kim Petras	—N/a
2020	"Malibu"	Kim Petras	—N/a
2019	"Personal Hell"	Kim Petras	Clarity
2019	"Sweet Spot"	Kim Petras	Clarity
2019	"Do Me"	Kim Petras	Clarity
2019	"Icy"	Kim Petras	Clarity
2019	"There Will Be Blood"	Kim Petras	Turn Off the Light, Vol. 2
2019	"Wrong Turn"	Kim Petras	Turn Off the Light, Vol. 2
2019	"Purgatory"	Kim Petras	Turn Off the Light, Vol. 2
2019	"Bloody Valentine"	Kim Petras	Turn Off the Light, Vol. 2
2019	"Knives"	Kim Petras	Turn Off the Light, Vol. 2
2019	"Demons"	Kim Petras	Turn Off the Light, Vol. 2
2019	"Massacre"	Kim Petras	Turn Off the Light, Vol. 2
2019	"Death by Sex"	Kim Petras	Turn Off the Light, Vol. 2
2018	"Time Is Up"	Poppy	Am I a Girl?
2018	"Boo! Bitch!"	Kim Petras	Turn Off the Light
2018	"TRANSylvania"	Kim Petras	Turn Off the Light
2018	"i don't wanna die..."	Kim Petras	Turn Off the Light
2018	"o m e n"	Kim Petras	Turn Off the Light
2018	"Party Till I Die"	Kim Petras	Turn Off the Light
2017	"You can Cry Tomorrow"	Betty Who	—N/a
2016	"Lying To You"	Goldroom	—N/a
2015	"Calling Out"	Penguin Prison	—N/a
2014	“Toho”	Yelle	—N/a
2014	“Motion Study”	Alex Metric	—N/a
2014	"Old 45s"	Chromeo	White Women
2014	"Frequent Flyer"	Chromeo	White Women

=== Co-written songs ===
Year	Artist	Song
2026	Blackpink	"Me and My"
2024	Bree Runway, Khalid	"Be The One (with Khalid)"
2024	B.I	"Tasty"
2023	Benny Sings	“Movie Star“
2023	JHart	“Crash My Car”
2023	Benny Sings and Remi Wolf	“Pyjamas”
2022	WENGIE	“Ghost“
2022	GuiltyBeatz, Twitch 4EVA, Mr Hudson	“Universe“
2022	Snakehips	“WATER“
2021	Jake Shears	"Do The Television"
2020	Yelle	"Je t'aime encore"
2020	Sam Sparro	“Marvelous Lover”
2020	Choices	"Less Is More"
2019	Goldroom	"Everybody's Lonely"
2018	Aeroplane, Tawatha Agee	"Love On Hold (feat. Tawatha Agee)"
2017	Smalltown DJs, Lisa Lobsinger	“Erased the Night”
2016	Alex Frankel	"Negative Space"
2016	Jordan Smith	“Leave A Little Light On“
2015	Against The Current	"Outsiders"
2015	Kelly Clarkson	"Nostalgic"
2014	Yelle	"Nuit de baise I"
2014	Destructo	"Technology"
2014	Alex Metric, Oliver	“Galaxy”
2013	Destructo	“Higher”
2013	Destructo	“2112”
2013	A-Trak, Oliver	“Zamboni”
2013	Anna Lunoe	“Breathe - Extended”
2012	A-Trak, Oliver	“Disco Nap”
2012	Destructo	“La Funky”
2012	Destructo	“Stand Sill”
