= Amra Silajdžić =

Bosnian model and actress (born 1984)

Amra Silajdžić-Džeko
- Born: Amra Silajdžić; 1 October 1984 (age 41); Sarajevo, SR Bosnia and Herzegovina, SFR Yugoslavia
- Occupations: Model, actress
- Years active: 2000–present (as model); 2010–present (as actress)
- Spouses: Vladimir Vićentijević (m. 2001; div. 2007) Edin Džeko (m. 2016)
- Children: 5

Amra Silajdžić-Džeko (born 1 October 1984) is a Bosnian model and actress.

== Career ==
In 2000, aged 16, Silajdžić won the French contest, Metropolitan Top Model. She was noticed by fashion scouts and then joined Elite Model in Paris. Silajdžić was featured in commercials for the clothing company Anchor Blue and was the face of Robin Jeans. Since 2010, she has had bit parts in several American television series and a couples of films.

Silajdžić has appeared in music-videos by recording artists such as Enrique Iglesias, Chromeo, The Cataracs, Taio Cruz and Blake Shelton.

Silajdžić had her first starring role in the American film Gothic Assassins, which premiered in October 2011 at the Lucerne Int'l Film Festival in Switzerland.

== Personal life ==
Silajdžić married Serbian businessman Vladimir Vićentijević in 2001. Their daughter was born in 2003. They divorced in 2007.

Silajdžić has been in a relationship with Bosnian footballer Edin Džeko since 2011. The couple married in January 2016 in Rome. In 2016, Džeko and Silajdžić became parents of a girl. In 2017, their second child, a boy, was born in Rome. She delivered their third child, a daughter, in 2020. Their fourth child, a daughter, was born in 2023.

== Filmography ==
Film
Year	Title	Role	Notes
2011	Gothic Assassins	Scarlett Dax	
2013	Ja sam iz Krajine, zemlje kestena	Young Ajka	
2014	Devet položaja samoće		

Television
Year	Title	Role	Notes
2010	CSI: NY	Sass Dumonde	
2011	Entourage	Vince's Ex	
2012	Don't Trust the B— in Apartment 23	Svetlana	
2015	Silicon Valley	Jelena	

Music videos
Year	Title	Artist
2010	Dynamite	Taio Cruz
2010	No Me Digas Que No	Enrique Iglesias
2011	Top of the World	The Cataracs
2011	Honey Bee	Blake Shelton
2014	Jealous (I Ain't with It)	Chromeo
2014	Old 45's	Chromeo
