= Wherever We Are =

Wherever We Are may refer to:

- "Wherever We Are", song by Human Life
- "Wherever We Are", song by Oliver from Full Circle
- "Wherever We Are", song from the musical Come from Away
