= Ben Maddahi =

American music executive (born 1983)

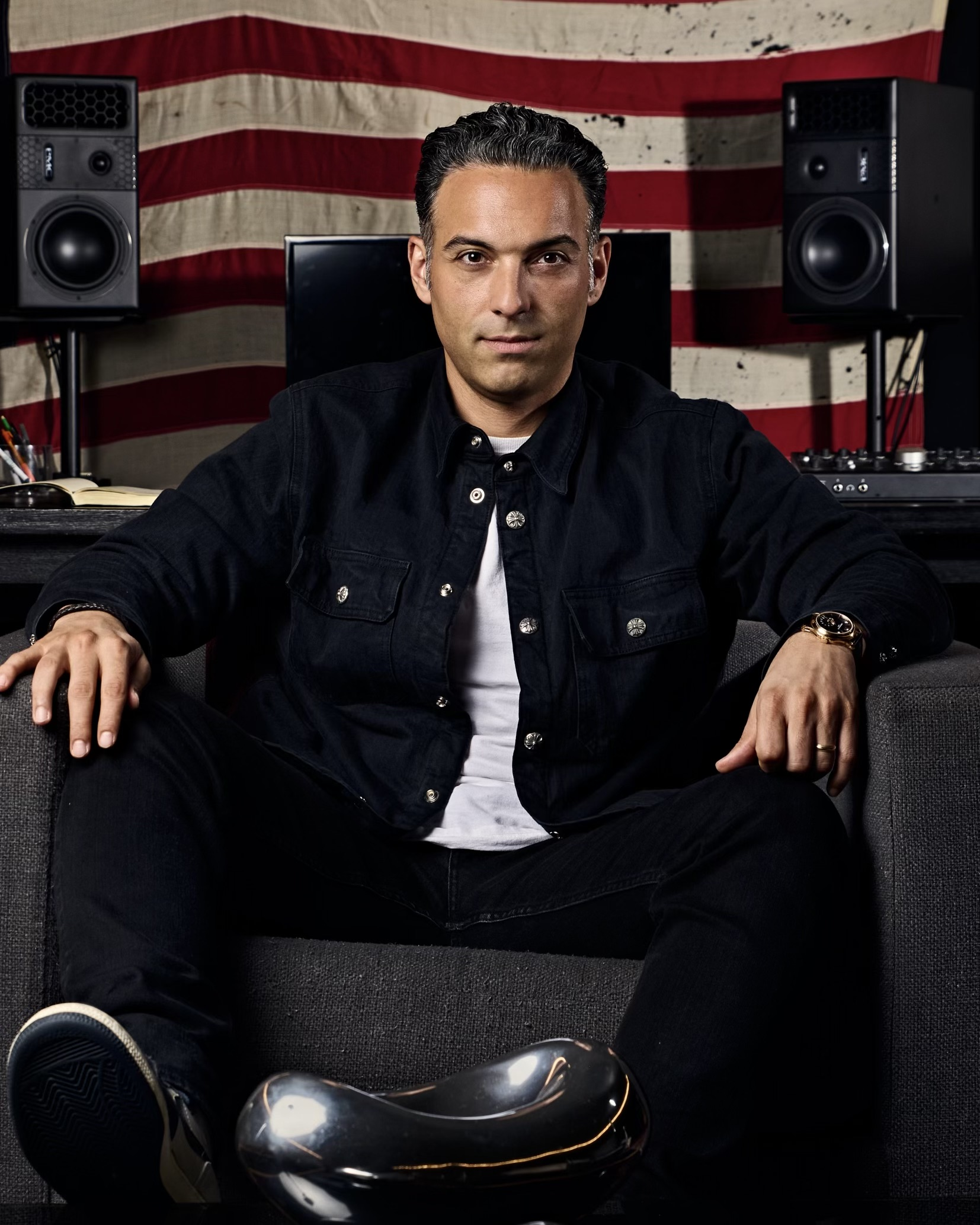
- Maddahi in 2025

Background information
- Born: Benjamin Maddahi; 1984 (age 41–42)
- Origin: Los Angeles, California, U.S.
- Occupations: Executive Vice President of A&R at Columbia Records and President of UNRESTRICTED

Ben Maddahi is an American music executive. He is currently executive vice-president of A&R at Columbia Records and president of UNRESTRICTED, a music publishing and management company he founded in 2015. From 2012 to 2015, he served as the president of Artist Publishing Group (APG), the parent company of Artist Partner Group.

At Columbia, APG, and Atlantic Records, Maddahi has worked as an A&R representative with artists including XXXTentacion, Jennie Kim, Diplo, Koe Wetzel, Jessie Murph, David Guetta, Chromeo, Bilmuri, The Chainsmokers, John Legend, Grimes, Charlie Puth, Demi Lovato, Flo Rida, Clinton Kane, and Cochise. As a publisher, he has had a role in shaping songs for artists including Kanye West, Chris Brown, Enrique Iglesias, Ariana Grande, Zedd, Black Eyed Peas, and Future. He has written and produced for artists including Jessie Murph, Koe Wetzel, Sia, Flo Rida, Justin Bieber, and Pitbull, and worked as the executive producer of Chromeo's Grammy-nominated album Head Over Heels.

== Early life ==
Maddahi was born in 1984 in Los Angeles, California. His father, Jamshid Maddahi, is a professor of Molecular and Medical pharmacology at the David Geffen School of Medicine at UCLA. He began playing music at the age of five, and played drums for the Los Angeles Junior Philharmonic while attending high school at Milken Community School. In 2001, he enrolled at the University of Southern California, where he began producing and writing music. Though he initially planned to attend law school after completing his undergraduate studies, a course he took in music management directed him further towards a career in the music industry. He became increasingly focused on music, gaining his first management client—the producer King David—while still in college. He graduated in 2005 with a degree in political science and a music industry minor.

== Career ==
In February 2006, Maddahi joined Atlantic Records as an A&R intern. There, he worked under A&R executive Mike Caren, who soon founded Artist Publishing Group (APG) and hired Maddahi as the company's first employee in August of that year. Around this time, Maddahi also started his own management company, Madd Music Management, which later operated under Atlantic.

In his early years at APG, Maddahi played a role in crafting songs like Enrique Iglesias' "Tonight (I'm Lovin' You)" and Chris Brown's "Yeah 3x." In 2010, he was promoted to Vice President of A&R at APG, and was promoted to A&R Director at Atlantic Records the following year. At APG, he then helped shape four hit singles for the rapper Flo Rida -- "Good Feeling," "Wild Ones," "Whistle," and "I Cry"—each of which were co-written by writers signed to APG. Later that year, he arranged studio sessions for David Guetta's album Nothing But The Beat, including bringing the Australian vocalist Sia in to record the topline for what later became the hit single "Titanium." In December 2012, he was promoted to president at APG.

In 2014, Maddahi arranged the studio session between Charlie Puth and the producers DJ Frank E and Andrew Cedar that led to Wiz Khalifa's "See You Again," released as the lead single on the soundtrack to the 2015 film Furious 7. The track was both Puth and Khalifa's biggest single to date, spending twelve nonconsecutive weeks atop the US Billboard Hot 100.

In 2015, Maddahi left both Atlantic and APG to consult for SONGS Music Publishing, where he, in partnership with Ron Perry, launched UNRESTRICTED, a music publishing and artist management company. Early management clients included DJ Frank E and pop songwriter Shy Carter, while publishing clients included XXXTentacion collaborators John Cunningham and Robert Soukiasyan.

In 2017, he joined Island Records as an A&R consultant.

In 2018, following the $150 million sale of SONGS' catalog to Kobalt Capital (the capital fund of Kobalt Music Group), the previous year, Maddahi was hired as senior vice president of A&R at Columbia Records. There, he has worked in an A&R capacity with artists including Koe Wetzel, Jessie Murph, Diplo, The Chainsmokers, Jennie Kim, and Bilmuri.

== Select credits ==
- XXXTENTACION - "SKINS" album (publisher)
- XXXTENTACION - "BAD!" (publisher)
- XXXTENTACION - "Fuck Love"
- Zedd & Alessia Cara - "Stay" (Grammy Nominee)
- XXXTENTACION - "SAD!" (publisher)
- XXXTENTACION - "Moonlight" (publisher)
- Wiz Khalifa feat. Charlie Puth - "See You Again" (3x Grammy Nominee)
- David Guetta - "Nothing But The Beat" album (Grammy Nominee)
- David Guetta feat. Sia - "Titanium"
- Kanye West - "Blame Game" feat. John Legend
- Ariana Grande - "One Last Time"
- Chromeo - "Head Over Heels" album (Co-Executive Producer)
- Flo Rida feat. Sia - "Wild Ones" (Co-writer, Grammy Nominee)
- Chris Brown - "Yeah 3X"
- Jawsh 685 feat. Jason Derulo - "Savage Love (Laxed - Siren Beat)"
- Internet Money feat. Gunna, Don Toliver, NAV - "Lemonade"

== Accolades ==
Several songs and albums that Maddahi has worked on have been nominated for Grammy awards, including:

- David Guetta - "Nothing But The Beat" (2011) for Best Dance/Electronica Album
- Flo Rida feat. Sia - "Wild Ones" (2012) for Best Rap/Sung Collaboration
- Wiz Khalifa feat. Charlie Puth - "See You Again" (2015) for Song of the Year, Best Pop Duo/Group Performance, and Best Song Written for Visual Media
- Zedd & Alessia Cara - "Stay" (2018) for Best Collaboration by a Duo or Group
- Chromeo - "Head Over Heels" (2018) for Best Engineered Album, Non-Classical

In 2011, Maddahi was also listed in Billboard Magazine's "30 Under 30" list.

== TV appearances ==
Starting in April 2013, Maddahi appeared as 1 of 3 judges on the VH1 DJ competition series Master of the Mix for 10 episodes
