= Jealous (I Ain't with It) =

Single by Chromeo

from the album White Women
- Released: March 4, 2014
- Genre: Electrofunk; dance-pop
- Length: 3:48
- Label: Parlophone
- Songwriters: David Macklovitch; Patrick Gemayel; Oliver Goldstein
- Producers: Chromeo; Oliver

Chromeo singles chronology
"Come Alive" (2014)	"Jealous (I Ain't with It)" (2014)	"Old 45's" (2015)

"Jealous (I Ain't with It)" is a song by French-Canadian electrofunk duo Chromeo. It was released in March 2014 as the fourth single from their album White Women. The song has reached #12 in their native country, Canada.

== Music video ==
A music video was released on March 18, 2014, directed by Ryan Hope. Dave 1 is a priest in Las Vegas and weds several couples inside the chapel including a loan shark and his bride, a rancher and his bride, and an older couple. Throughout the song, the priest becomes increasingly irritable and jealous of the beautiful women he is blessing, at one point, even yelling out in his outrage, causing a scene. Finally, A$AP Ferg walks down the aisle with Amra Silajdžić, and the priest is awestruck. The man snaps his fingers at the priest impatiently after noticing him staring at her, to which the priest pushes the man away and runs away with the woman and jumps into a 1987 Ford Mustang GT convertible and P-Thugg drives them off. The song closes out with Dave 1 on the side of the road peeing onto the vegetation when he hears the tires squeal and tries chasing down the Mustang as P-Thugg and the bride drive off without him, leaving him stranded.

== Use in the media ==
The song was used in commercials by Canadian Mazda, and Google Wear OS. The song was also used on an episode of Dancing with the Stars, along with being included on the Forza Horizon 2 soundtrack.

== Charts and certifications ==
=== Weekly charts ===
Chart (2014)	Peak position
Belgium (Ultratip Bubbling Under Flanders)	5
Belgium (Ultratip Bubbling Under Wallonia)	4
Canada (Canadian Hot 100)	12
Czech Republic (Singles Digitál Top 100)	54
Hungary (Rádiós Top 40)	2
Slovakia (Singles Digitál Top 100)	55
UK Singles Chart (OCC)	172
US Hot Dance/Electronic Songs (Billboard)	12

=== Year-end charts ===
Chart (2014)	Position
Canada (Canadian Hot 100)	55
Hungary (Rádiós Top 40)	41
US Hot Dance/Electronic Songs (Billboard)	35

=== Certifications ===
Region	Certification	Certified units/sales
Canada (Music Canada)	Platinum	85,000
