= No Tears on This Ride =

EP by Lu Kala
- Released: April 25, 2025
- Genre: Pop
- Length: 19:08
- Label: LVK; Amigo Records
- Producer: The Stereotypes; 9am; Blake Straus; Vaughn Oliver; Frequency; Dr. Luke; Space Primates; Aaron Joseph

Lu Kala chronology
Worthy (2020)	No Tears on This Ride (2025)

Singles from No Tears on This Ride
- 1. "Pretty Girl Era" Released: December 2, 2022; 2. "Hotter Now" Released: September 22, 2023; 3. "Who's Gonna" Released: May 10, 2024; 4. "Criminal" Released: September 27, 2024; 5. "Cry Baby" Released: December 6, 2024

No Tears on This Ride is the second extended play by Congolese-Canadian singer Lu Kala, released on April 25, 2025, under LVK and Amigo Records. The EP includes the singles "Pretty Girl Era", which went viral on social media, and "Hotter Now", which reached number 1 on Canadian iTunes.

== Composition ==
No Tears on This Ride is the second EP by Lu Kala, and her first project under Dr. Luke's imprint Amigo Records. Lu told Tmrw Magazine, "It's fun and filled with a bunch of bad bitch anthems and reminders to never settle for anything less."

== Tour ==
=== Background ===
The release was accompanied by the No Tears on This Ride Tour. She had four dates in Los Angeles, Toronto, Montreal, and New York City.

=== Tour dates ===
Date (2025)	City	Country	Venue
May 8	Los Angeles	United States	The Peppermint Club
May 21	Toronto	Canada	The Axis Club
May 22	Montreal	Canada	La Sala Rossa
September 10	New York City	United States	Mercury Lounge

== Track listing ==
Track listing and credits adapted from Apple Music and Spotify.

No Tears on This Ride – track listing
No.	Title	Writer(s)	Producer(s)	Length
1.	"No Exes"	Elizabeth Lowell Boland; Jeff Baraonowski; Jeremy Reeves; Jonathan Yip; Luke Milano; Lusamba Vanessa Kalala	The Stereotypes; 9am	3:11
2.	"Criminal"	Boy Matthews; Vaughn Oliver; Lukasz Gottwald; Blake Straus; Kalala	Blake Straus; Vaughn Oliver	2:11
3.	"Cry Baby"	Oliver; Bryan Fryzel; Boland; Kalala; Stephanie Jane Lang	Oliver; Frequency	2:55
4.	"Work" (with Shelailai)	Lailah Francis; Kalala; Rocco Valdes; Theron Thomas; Gottwald	Dr. Luke; Rocco Did It Again!	2:15
5.	"Pretty Girl Era"	Madison Love; Gottwald; Kalala; Valdes	Dr. Luke	2:35
6.	"Hotter Now"	Matthews; Oliver; Gottwald; Kalala; Marc Raymond Ernest Sibley; Nathan Cunningham	Oliver; Space Primates; Dr. Luke	3:01
7.	"Who's Gonna"	Oliver; Gottwald; Aaron Joseph; Kalala; Valdes	Aaron Joseph; Oliver; Dr. Luke	2:58
Total length:				19:08

== Personnel ==
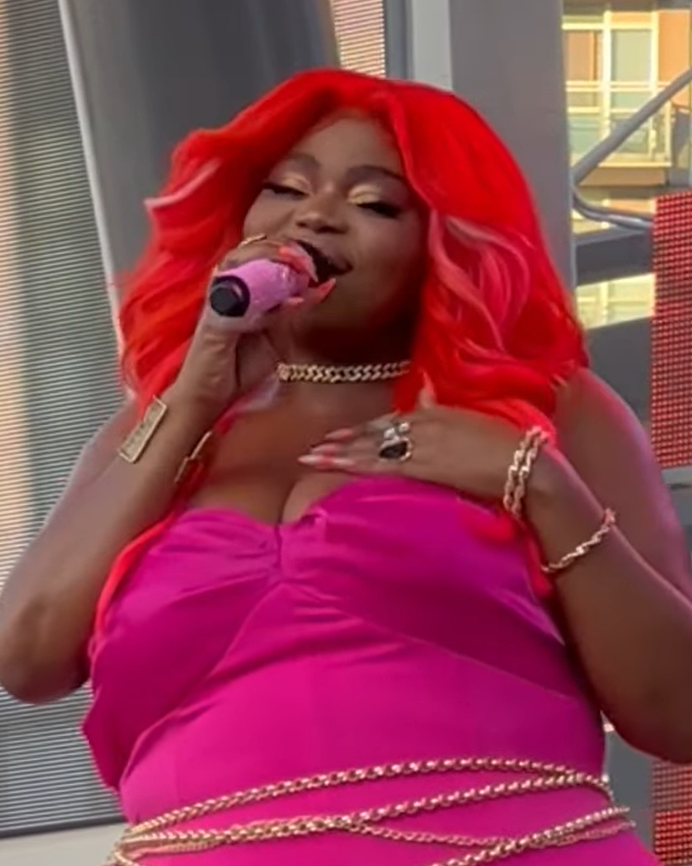
Lu Kala is the only person with writing credits on all songs from the EP.

Personnel adapted from Apple Music and Spotify.

- Lu Kala – primary artist, composer, vocals
- Shelailai – featured artist, composer, vocals
- Blake Straus – composer, producer
- Vaughn Oliver – composer, producer
- Rocco Did It Again! – composer, producer
- Dr. Luke – composer, producer
- Aaron Joseph – composer, producer
- Elizabeth Lowell Boland – composer
- Jeff Baraonowski – composer
- Jeremy Reeves – composer
- Jonathan Yip – composer
- Luke Milano – composer
- Boy Matthews – composer
- Bryan Fryzel – composer
- Lailah Francis – composer
- Theron Thomas – composer
- Madison Love – composer
- Marc Raymond Ernest Sibley – composer
- Nathan Cunningham – composer
- The Stereotypes – producer
- Space Primates – producer
- Frequency – producer
