= Lu Kala =

Congolese-Canadian singer (born 1995)

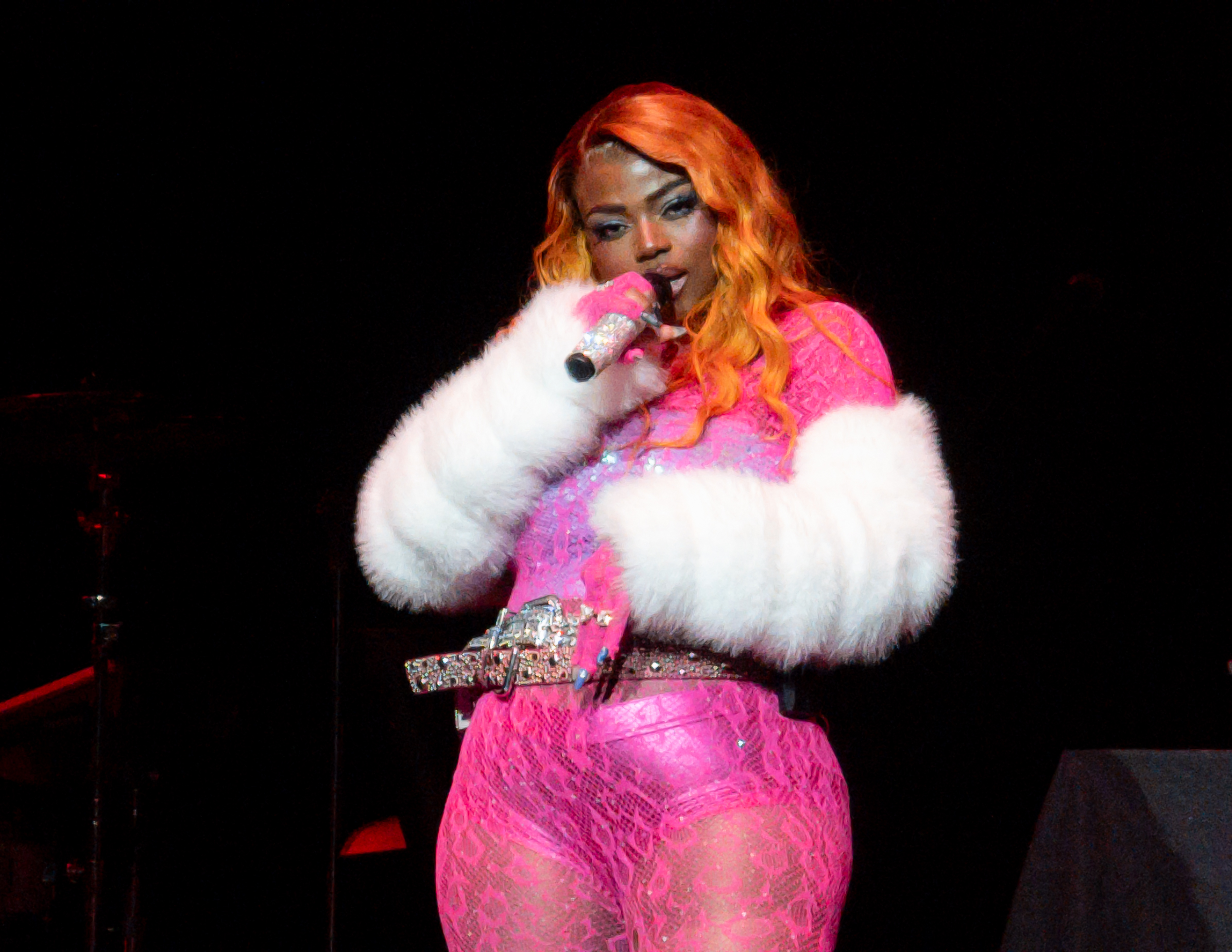
- Kala performing in 2025

Background information
- Born: Lusamba Vanessa Kalala; 21 July 1995 (age 31); Kinshasa, Zaire
- Origin: Toronto, Ontario, Canada
- Genre: Pop
- Occupations: Singer; songwriter
- Labels: AWAL; Amigo
- Website: igobylu.com

Lusamba Vanessa Kalala (born 21 July 1995), better known by her stage name Lu Kala (stylized in all caps), is a Congolese-Canadian singer. She received recognition after writing on "Dangerous" by Jennifer Hudson and "OK" by Katy Perry, and her guest appearance on American rapper Latto's 2023 single "Lottery", which entered the Billboard Hot 100 and Canadian Hot 100. Her 2025 extended play, No Tears on This Ride, spawned the viral hit "Pretty Girl Era" and Canadian iTunes Store number one "Hotter Now". In addition to a solo tour, Kala has also toured with Cyndi Lauper and Aqua.

== Career ==
Kala emigrated to Canada at the age of three. She first grew up in the Regent Park neighbourhood and later lived in Ajax, Ontario.

Kala began her career with songwriting, as she is credited as a writer on Jennifer Hudson's track "Dangerous" from her 2014 studio album JHUD.

Kala performed at the Canadian Music Week in 2019 where she performed her debut single, "DCMO (Don't Count Me Out)". She also won the grand prize at Royal Bank of Canada's Emerging Musician Program, earning $10,000 worth of studio time among other prizes.

In February 2023, Latto released "Lottery" which featured Kala, marking Kala's first entry on the Billboard Hot 100 and Billboard Canadian Hot 100. On 1 March, Latto and Kala performed the song at the 2023 Billboard Women in Music event. In April, her 2022 single "Pretty Girl Era" entered the Billboard Canadian Hot 100, marking her first solo entry on the chart. On 24 September 2023, Kala received the Emerging Artist Award at the Legacy Awards. On 10 December, she performed at TikTok's inaugural In the Mix festival in Mesa, Arizona.

Kala was nominated for two Juno Awards in 2024, and she performed at the opening night of the show. In March, Kala received two No. 1 Song Awards from SOCAN for her singles "Hotter Now" and "Nothing but Love". Following this, "Hotter Now" became her highest peaking song on the Billboard Canadian Hot 100. In April, it was revealed that Kala had written a song with Katy Perry (later revealed to be "OK" from the deluxe edition of Perry's 2024 studio album 143). On 4 July, Kala won the inaugural Billboard Canada Women in Music Rising Star Award. In the same month, her single "Who's Gonna" the entered Canadian Contemporary hit radio chart. In September 2024, Kala released her single "Criminal" after performing it at the Billboard Canada Women in Music event. In October 2024, Kala joined Cyndi Lauper as an opener for two dates on the Girls Just Wanna Have Fun Farewell Tour. On 21 November 2024, Kala appeared as a guest judge on the season premiere of the fifth season of Canada's Drag Race. Two days later, she announced her single "Cry Baby".

On 25 April 2025, Kala released her second EP, No Tears on This Ride. She later embarked on the No Tears on This Ride Tour to accompany the project. In September 2025, Kala was an opening act for Aqua's Canada tour.

On 10 July 2026, Kala released her single "G.Y.M." following a fitness transformation.

== Discography ==
=== Extended plays ===
| Title | Details |
|---|---|
| Worthy | Released: 21 October 2020; Label: Self-released; Formats: Digital download, streaming |
| No Tears on This Ride | Released: 25 April 2025; Label: Amigo Records; Formats: Digital download, streaming |

=== Singles ===
==== As lead artist ====
List of singles, with selected chart positions
| Title | Year | Peak chart positions | | | | | Album |
| Title | Year | CAN | CAN AC | CAN CHR | CAN HAC | RUS | Album |
|---|---|---|---|---|---|---|---|
| "DCMO (Don't Count Me Out)" | 2018 | — | — | — | — | — | Worthy |
| "Body Knew" | 2020 | — | — | — | — | — | Worthy |
| "Want You" | 2020 | — | — | — | — | — | Worthy |
| "No Smoke" | 2020 | — | — | — | — | — | Worthy |
| "Love Like" | 2020 | — | — | — | — | — | Worthy |
| "Pretty Girl Era" | 2022 | 49 | 6 | 9 | 23 | — | No Tears on This Ride |
| "Hotter Now" | 2023 | 40 | 4 | 7 | 8 | 13 | No Tears on This Ride |
| "Nothing But Love" | 2024 | — | — | — | — | — | Non-album single |
| "Who's Gonna" | 2024 | — | 49 | 10 | 30 | — | No Tears on This Ride |
| "Criminal" | 2024 | — | — | — | — | — | No Tears on This Ride |
| "Cry Baby" | 2024 | — | — | — | — | — | No Tears on This Ride |
| "Jingle Bell Rock" | 2025 | — | — | — | — | — | Non-album singles |
| "G.Y.M." | 2026 | — | — | — | — | — | Non-album singles |
| "Bad News" | 2026 | — | — | — | — | — | Non-album singles |
"—" denotes a title that did not chart, or was not released in that territory.

==== As featured artist ====
List of singles showing year released, chart positions and album name
| Title | Year | Peak chart positions | | | | | Album |
| Title | Year | CAN | US | US R&B/HH | US Rap | NZ | Album |
|---|---|---|---|---|---|---|---|
| "Today" (Polun featuring Lu Kala) | 2021 | — | — | — | — | — | Non-album singles |
| "Lottery" (Latto featuring Lu Kala) | 2023 | 51 | 83 | 29 | 17 | — (Note: "Lottery" did not enter the NZ Top 40 Singles Chart, but peaked at number 32 on the NZ Hot Singles Chart.) | Non-album singles |
"—" denotes a title that did not chart, or was not released in that territory.

=== Songwriting credits ===
| Title | Year | Co-writers | Artist | Album |
|---|---|---|---|---|
| "Dangerous" | 2014 | Paul Jefferies; Daniel Daley; Stephen Kozmeniuk; Zale Epstein | Jennifer Hudson | JHUD |
| "OK" | 2024 | Katy Perry; Lukasz Gottwald; Vaughn Oliver; Aaron Joseph; Rocco Valdes; Chloe Angelides; Ryan Ogren; Ferras Alqaisi | Katy Perry | 143 |

== Tours ==
=== Headlining ===
- No Tears On This Ride Tour (2025)

=== Supporting ===
- Cyndi Lauper - Girls Just Wanna Have Fun Farewell Tour (2024)
- Aqua - Canada 2025 Tour (2025)
