= Full Circle (Oliver album) =

Studio album by Oliver
- Released: August 25, 2017
- Genre: Electropop
- Label: Interscope Records

Full Circle is the only studio album of Los Angeles-based electronic duo Oliver. It was released on August 25, 2017 by Interscope Records. After its release, Vaughn Oliver announced that no plans have been set for the duo's future, and stated that though he and Goldstein are on good terms, they haven't worked on music for over a year since then.

== Background ==
Billboard described the opener as "a '70s sci-fi movie with a cinematic, moody intro called 'Portrait' that melts into the sleek synth-porn of 'Ottomatic'." The album features collaborations with De La Soul, Chromeo, Sam Sparro, MNDR, Elohim, Yelle, Leon Else and Scott Mellis. Oligee Goldstein from Oliver, said:

It's not really an album era anymore, but we love albums. We wanted to create a piece of work that had an arc to it, that shows a lot of different approaches stylistically. When you have a three- or four-song EP, you can't really showcase everything that you want to say. With a full-length, we could really spread it out and just show all the different ideas and different sides of us.

== Singles ==
"Heart Attack" and "Chemicals" were released as the first and second singles respectively.

== Track listing ==
Adapted from iTunes.

Standard version
No.	Title	Writer(s)	Producer(s)	Length
1.	"Portrait"	Oliver Goldstein; Vaughn Oliver	Oliver	1:06
2.	"Ottomatic"	Oliver Goldstein; Vaughn Oliver; Steve George; Charles Johnson; Richard Page; John Ross Lang	Oliver	4:41
3.	"Chemicals" (featuring MNDR)	Oliver Goldstein; Vaughn Oliver; Amanda Warner; Justin Drew Tranter	Oliver	4:20
4.	"Love Like This" (featuring Leon Else)	Oliver Goldstein; Vaughn Oliver; Joshua Thompson; Leon Else	Oliver	3:38
5.	"Last Forever" (featuring Sam Sparro)	Oliver Goldstein; Vaughn Oliver; Samuel Falson	Oliver	4:47
6.	"Heart Attack" (featuring De La Soul)	Oliver Goldstein; Vaughn Oliver; Kelvin Mercer; Nicole Morier; Martika; Michael Jay Margules; David Jolicoeur; Chris Glover	Oliver	3:50
7.	"One"	Oliver Goldstein; Vaughn Oliver	Oliver	2:24
8.	"Space & Sound"	Oliver Goldstein; Vaughn Oliver; Johnnie Newman	Oliver	4:26
9.	"Falling Back" (featuring MNDR)	Oliver Goldstein; Vaughn Oliver; Amanda Warner	Oliver	3:50
10.	"Go With It" (featuring Chromeo)	Oliver Goldstein; Vaughn Oliver; David Macklovitch; Patrick Gemayel	Oliver	3:52
11.	"Wherever We Are" (featuring ELOHIM)	Oliver Goldstein; Vaughn Oliver; ELOHIM	Oliver	4:27
12.	"Electrify" (featuring Scott Mellis)	Oliver Goldstein; Vaughn Oliver; Scott Mellis	Oliver	3:36
13.	"Heterotopia" (featuring Yelle)	Oliver Goldstein; Vaughn Oliver; Julie Budet; Jean-Francois Perrier	Oliver	3:44
14.	"At Night"	Oliver Goldstein; Vaughn Oliver	Oliver	4:30
15.	"Full Circle"	Oliver Goldstein; Vaughn Oliver	Oliver	1:21
