= Head over Heels (Chromeo album) =

Studio album by Chromeo
- Released: June 15, 2018
- Recorded: 2016–2018
- Studio: Chumba Meadows, Tarzana; Clift Studios, Brooklyn; Liedtke Studios, New York; Maddahi Vineyards, Solvang; No Nome Studios; Studio City; The Funklordz Writing Retreat, Ojai; The Mothership, Montreal; The Private Sector, Burbank; TZM Studios, Tarzana
- Genre: Funk
- Length: 43:05
- Label: Big Beat; Atlantic
- Producer: A-Trak; Chromeo; Raphael Saadiq; Rodney "Darkchild" Jerkins; Pino Palladino; Adam "Ash" Harrison; Jason Evigan; Ben Maddahi; Gian Stone; Oligee; Gladius James; Chris O'Ryan; John Cunningham; Vaughn Oliver; Ian Kirkpatrick; Morgan Taylor Reid; Ammo; DallasK

Chromeo chronology
White Women (2014)	Head over Heels (2018)	Adult Contemporary (2024)

Singles from Head Over Heels
- 1. "Juice" Released: November 7, 2017; 2. "Bedroom Calling" Released: January 29, 2018; 3. "Must've Been" Released: April 6, 2018; 4. "Bad Decision" Released: June 15, 2018

Head over Heels is the fifth studio album by Canadian electro-funk duo Chromeo. It was released on June 15, 2018, via Big Beat and Atlantic Records. The album features vocals from artists such as The-Dream, French Montana, Stefflon Don, DRAM and Amber Mark, with production work from producers such as Raphael Saadiq, Rodney Jerkins and Pino Palladino.

== Background ==
The album was first announced in November 2017 and a release date for the album in April 2018. It consists of "talk-box–assisted pop songs about dating mishaps, comically disastrous relationships and anxiety-inducing sexual encounters." The album's recording process began 2 years before its release with Chromeo stating "...we were impatient to do the new record – so we spent the last two years working on this one [Head Over Heels]."

Speaking about the album, Chromeo said: "The mission statement for this album, for us, was to kind of pen this overarching love letter to funk music and the different kinds of funk music that have influenced us throughout the years since we discovered funk music when we were teenagers all the way until now... But it's also sort of, you know, going back to the real roots of funk. We made this one much more live, just a little less electronic than our previous two, three albums."

The artwork displays the legs of Chromeo members instead of a pair of women's legs, which is their signature symbol that has been on the artwork of previous albums.

A video for "Don't Sleep" was released on December 7, 2018.

In December 2018, Chromeo received their first Grammy nomination for Best Engineered Album, Non-Classical in the 61st Grammy Awards for the album.

== Critical reception ==
Professional ratings
Aggregate scores
Source	Rating
Metacritic	70/100
Review scores
Source	Rating
Consequence of Sound	B−
Drowned in Sound	9/10
Exclaim!	7/10
The Independent	3/5 stars
Pitchfork	5.7/10
Rolling Stone	3/5 stars
Slant	3/5 stars
Spectrum Culture	4/5 stars

Pitchfork described the album as "sound[ing] expert, expensive, accomplished, while being distasteful in almost everything else", rating it 5.7 out of 10. They also implied that the album's heavy usage of guest stars was the band's attempt to emulate Daft Punk's Random Access Memories. Rolling Stone described the album as consisting of moments that are "fleeting and aren't enough to make one fall head over heels", rating it with 3 out of 5 stars. Songs from the album were described as "chronicles of potential partner worship of goddess devotion" by Drowned in Sound. Slant Magazine called the album "White Women Part 2".

== Track listing ==
Head over Heels track listing
No.	Title	Writer(s)	Producer(s)	Length
1.	"Must've Been" (featuring DRAM)	Patrick Gemayel; David Macklovitch; Jason Evigan; Jacob Kasher Hindlin; Gamal Lewis; Isaiah Tejada; Ammar Malik; Shelly Massenburg-Smith; William Bastian	Chromeo; A-Trak; J. Evigan; Gian Stone; Ash Harrison; Ben Maddahi	3:28
2.	"Don't Sleep" (featuring French Montana and Stefflon Don)	Gemayel; Macklovitch; Rodney "Darkchild" Jerkins; Sean Douglas; Karim Kharbouch; Stephanie Allen	Chromeo; A-Trak; Darkchild; Oligee; Gladius James; Harrison; Maddahi	3:18
3.	"One Track Mind"	Gemayel; Macklovitch; J. Evigan; Gregory Evigan; Lindy Robbins; Scott Friedman; Talay Riley; Lenny Macaluso	Chromeo; A-Trak; J. Evigan; Chris "TEK" O'Ryan; John Cunningham; Harrison; Maddahi	3:23
4.	"Count Me Out"	Gemayel; Macklovitch; Ian Kirkpatrick; Douglas	Chromeo; A-Trak; Kirkpatrick; Harrison; Maddahi	3:36
5.	"Bad Decision"	Gemayel; Macklovitch; Morgan Taylor Reid; Annaliese Schiersch; Chelsea Lena; Peter Harding	Chromeo; A-Trak; Morgan Taylor Reid; O'Ryan; Oligee; Vaughn Oliver; Harrison; Maddahi	3:06
6.	"Right Back Home to You (Interlude)"	Gemayel; Macklovitch; Ian Smith	Chromeo; A-Trak; Harrison; Maddahi	2:43
7.	"Just Friends" (featuring Amber Mark)	Gemayel; Macklovitch; Charles Wiggins; Alexander Frankel; Amber Mark	Chromeo; A-Trak; Oligee; Harrison; Maddahi	3:49
8.	"Juice"	Gemayel; Macklovitch; J. Evigan; Douglas	Chromeo; J. Evigan; O'Ryan	3:17
9.	"Slumming It"	Gemayel; Macklovitch; Kirkpatrick; Douglas	Chromeo; A-Trak; Kirkpatrick; Harrison; Maddahi	4:30
10.	"Bedroom Calling, Pt. 1"	Gemayel; Macklovitch; Joshua Coleman; Dallas Koehlke	Chromeo; A-Trak; Ammo; Oligee; DallasK; Harrison; Maddahi	3:14
11.	"Bedroom Calling, Pt. 2" (featuring The-Dream)	Gemayel; Macklovitch; Coleman; Koehlke; Carlos McKinney; Terius Nash	Chromeo; A-Trak; Oliver; Harrison; Maddahi	3:24
12.	"Room Service"	Gemayel; Macklovitch; Douglas	Chromeo; Oligee	5:17
Total length:				43:05

== Charts ==
Chart performance for Head over Heels
Chart (2018)	Peak position
Belgian Albums (Ultratop Flanders)	142
French Albums (SNEP)	189
Canadian Albums (Billboard)	74
Swiss Albums (Schweizer Hitparade)	62
US Billboard 200	91
US Top Dance Albums (Billboard)	1
