= Date Night: Chromeo Live! =

Live album by Chromeo
- Released: June 25, 2021
- Venue: multiple
- Genres: Electro-funk; nu-disco; synth-pop; dance-rock
- Length: 1:24:00
- Labels: Last Gang Records; eOne

Date Night: Chromeo Live! is the first live album by Canadian electro-funk duo Chromeo, released on June 25, 2021, by Last Gang Records (LP) and eOne (digital download). The album was recorded during the group's 2019 US tour. The album was born while the group was listening to tour recordings out of a feeling of nostalgia during the COVID-19 pandemic. Proceeds from the album's sales benefit the Touring Professionals Alliance, which helps members of the live music industry impacted by the pandemic. The group released ‘Don’t Sleep (Live in Washington D.C.)’ as the first single from the album.

== Track listing ==
No.	Title	Length
1.	"Funklordz Intro (live in New York City)"	2:09
2.	"Fancy Footwork (live in New York City)"	3:09
3.	"Juice (live in Vancouver)"	3:19
4.	"Hot Mess (live in Seattle)"	3:47
5.	"Come Alive (live in Los Angeles)"	4:29
6.	"Night By Night (live in Portland)"	4:13
7.	"Bad Decision (live in Minneapolis)"	4:04
8.	"(My Girl Is Calling Me A) Liar (live in Minneapolis)"	5:46
9.	"Needy Girl (live in Los Angeles)"	4:53
10.	"One Track Mind (live in Seattle)"	4:06
11.	"Bonafied Lovin' (live in San Francisco)"	3:27
12.	"Don't Sleep (live in Washington DC)"	4:36
13.	"Old 45s (live in Portland)"	5:32
14.	"Slumming It (live in New York City)"	4:27
15.	"Don't Turn The Lights On (live in Vancouver)"	4:02
16.	"Over Your Shoulder (live in San Francisco)"	5:13
17.	"100% (live in Minneapolis)"	6:14
18.	"Must've Been (live in Vancouver)"	3:31
19.	"Count Me In (live in New York)"	2:54
20.	"Jealous (I Ain't With It) (live in New York City)"	4:48
