= Adult Contemporary (album) =

Studio album by Chromeo
- Released: February 16, 2024
- Studios: Rift Studios, Brooklyn; The Private Sector, Burbank
- Genre: Funk
- Length: 50:47
- Label: BMG
- Producers: Chromeo; Ryland Blackinton

Chromeo chronology
Head over Heels (2018)	Adult Contemporary (2024)

Singles from Adult Contemporary
- 1. "Words with You" Released: March 10, 2023; 2. "Replacements" Released: April 25, 2023; 3. "(I Don't Need A) New Girl" Released: June 30, 2023; 4. "Personal Effects" Released: October 2, 2023

Adult Contemporary is the sixth studio album by Canadian electro-funk duo Chromeo. It was released on February 16, 2024, via BMG.

== Background ==
Thematically, the album centres around mature relationships and "staying funky in your 30s and 40s". According to Macklovitch, the title is a "play around that double entendre of maturity, but also sexiness."

== Critical reception ==
Professional ratings
Aggregate scores
Source	Rating
Metacritic	70/100
Review scores
Source	Rating
The Arts Desk	3/5 stars
Exclaim!	7/10
The Line of Best Fit	7/10
Pitchfork	6.3/10
Resident Advisor	Mixed

Adult Contemporary received generally favorable reviews from music critics. Writing for The Line of Best Fit, David Cobbald praised the album as "a whole lot of fun" and a "return to form" for the band. In a less favorable Pitchfork review, the album was described as "grown and sexy", and "a well-made 2010s pastiche of disco-funk". The Arts Desk opined that the album "has its moments, but never breaks a sweat". In a mostly favorable review, Flood Magazine noted "a sound far less overproduced than their recent material", but criticized some of the lyrics.

== Track listing ==
All tracks are written by Dave Macklovitch and Patrick Gemayel; "Replacements" written with Elly Jackson.

Adult Contemporary track listing
No.	Title	Length
1.	"(I Don't Need A) New Girl"	4:33
2.	"Got It Good"	4:02
3.	"Lost and Found"	3:34
4.	"BTS"	4:34
5.	"Replacements" (featuring La Roux)	4:18
6.	"Lonesome Nights"	4:10
7.	"Personal Effects"	3:59
8.	"She Knows It (Personal Effects Pt. 2)"	2:19
9.	"Ballad of the Insomniacs"	4:12
10.	"CODA"	3:48
11.	"Words with You"	3:56
12.	"A Cut Above"	2:38
13.	"Friendsnlovers"	2:35
14.	"Two of Us (Friendsnlovers Pt. 2)"	2:06
Total length:		50:47

Deluxe edition
No.	Title	Length
15.	"Replacements" (featuring La Roux) (single version)	3:49
16.	"On the Move" (featuring Cannons)	2:41
17.	"Justify" (featuring Felicia Douglass)	3:06
18.	"Real Breezy"	2:48
19.	"Lost and Found" (The Midnight Remix)	3:45
20.	"Replacements" (featuring La Roux) (Harvey Sutherland Remix)	4:39
Total length:		1:11:00

== Personnel ==
Chromeo

- Dave 1 – vocals, instruments, production
- P-Thugg – vocals, instruments, production

Additional musicians

- The Funklordz – gang vocals
- Tawatha Agee – backing vocals on "Got It Good", "Lonesome Nights", and "Words with You"
- A-Trak – gang vocals on "Got It Good" and "Ballad of the Insomniacs"
- Blake Martin – gang vocals on "Got It Good" and "Ballad of the Insomniacs"
- Patrick Kyle – gang vocals on "Got It Good" and "Ballad of the Insomniacs"
- La Roux – vocals and backing vocals on "Replacements"
- Sean Douglas – backing vocals on "Personal Effects"
- Felicia Douglass – backing vocals on "Ballad of the Insomniacs"
- Madeon – backing vocals on "Friendsnlovers"

Technical

- Ryland Blackinton – production on "Lost and Found" and "Personal Effects"
- Alex Gopher – mastering
- Morgan Geist – mixing

== Charts ==
Chart performance for Adult Contemporary
Chart (2024)	Peak position
UK Albums Sales (OCC)	35
UK Independent Albums (OCC)	13
US Top Current Album Sales (Billboard)	35
US Top Dance Albums (Billboard)	21
