= She's in Control =

Studio album by Chromeo
- Released: February 17, 2004
- Genre: Electro-funk; nu-disco; new wave; boogie; indietronica
- Length: 44:31
- Label: Turbo; Vice
- Producer: Chromeo

Chromeo chronology
She's in Control (2004)	Fancy Footwork (2007)

Singles from She's in Control
- 1. "You're So Gangsta" Released: July 10, 2002; 2. "Destination: Overdrive" Released: August 19, 2003; 3. "Me & My Man" Released: May 24, 2004; 4. "Needy Girl" Released: September 13, 2004; 5. "Rage!" Released: June 6, 2005

Professional ratings
Aggregate scores
Source	Rating
Metacritic	72/100
Review scores
Source	Rating
AllMusic	3/5 stars
Blender	3/5 stars
Pitchfork Media	7.3/10

She's in Control is the debut studio album by Canadian electro-funk duo Chromeo, released on February 17, 2004 by Turbo Recordings and Vice Records.

== Track listing ==
All tracks are written by Chromeo.

No.	Title	Length
1.	"Me & My Man"	4:19
2.	"Needy Girl"	4:17
3.	"You're So Gangsta"	4:01
4.	"Woman Friend"	3:46
5.	"Destination: Overdrive"	3:55
6.	"Rage!"	4:34
7.	"Since You Were Gone"	2:56
8.	"Way Too Much"	4:08
9.	"Mercury Tears"	4:01
10.	"Ah Oui Comme Ça" (translation: "Ah, yeah; like that")	5:20
11.	"She'z n Control"	3:14

UK edition bonus tracks
No.	Title	Length
12.	"You're So Gangsta" (Playgroup Remix)	5:48
13.	"Me & My Man" (Chromeo vs Whitey 'Fly Whitey' Mix)	4:03
14.	"Destination: Overdrive" (DFA Remix)	5:37
15.	"Needy Girl" (video)	3:59

== Personnel ==
Credits adapted from the liner notes of She's in Control.

- Chromeo – art direction, executive producer, instruments, mixing, production, vocals
- Coco – extra vocal bits (track 3)
- Tom Coyne – mastering
- Eskimo Design – art direction, artwork, cover photo
- Craig Hodgeson – saxophone, soloist (track 3)
- Kool DJ Alain M. – turntable scratches (track 2)
- Ozzie – extra vocal bits (track 1)
- Greg Smith – mixing, recording
- Tiga – executive producer

== Release history ==
Region	Date	Label	Ref.
Canada	February 17, 2004	Turbo; Vice	
United States	February 17, 2004	Vice	
Australia	June 6, 2004	Modular	
Germany	September 6, 2004	V2	
United Kingdom	September 20, 2004	Back Yard	
