= Fancy Footwork =

Studio album by Chromeo
- Released: May 8, 2007
- Studio: DNA Productions, Mixart Studios (Montreal); Third Side Studios (Paris)
- Genre: Electro-funk; nu-disco
- Length: 39:53
- Label: Turbo; Last Gang
- Producer: Chromeo

Chromeo chronology
She's in Control (2004)	Fancy Footwork (2007)	Business Casual (2010)

Singles from Fancy Footwork
- 1. "Fancy Footwork" Released: April 12, 2007; 2. "Tenderoni" Released: June 10, 2007; 3. "Bonafied Lovin" Released: November 1, 2007

Professional ratings
Review scores
Source	Rating
AllMusic	3/5 stars
Robert Christgau	A−
DIY	2.5/5 stars
musicOMH	3/5 stars
The Phoenix	3/4 stars
Pitchfork Media	7.9/10
PopMatters	6/10
Slant Magazine	2/5 stars
Stylus Magazine	B

Fancy Footwork is the second studio album by Canadian electro-funk duo Chromeo, released on May 8, 2007, by Turbo Recordings and Last Gang Records. The album spawned three singles: "Fancy Footwork", "Tenderoni", and "Bonafied Lovin". In the United States, Fancy Footwork reached number eleven on the Top Electronic Albums chart and number twenty-five on the Top Heatseekers chart.

A deluxe edition of the album was released in July 2008, containing a bonus disc of remixes and bonus tracks, as well as music videos. A special edition titled Fancier Footwork was released digitally in June 2008, consisting of three bonus tracks and fifteen remixes.

== Track listing ==
All tracks are written by Chromeo.

No.	Title	Length
1.	"Intro"	1:08
2.	"Tenderoni"	4:14
3.	"Fancy Footwork"	3:18
4.	"Bonafied Lovin (Tough Guys)"	4:32
5.	"My Girl Is Calling Me (A Liar)"	2:20
6.	"Outta Sight"	2:36
7.	"Opening Up (Ce soir on danse)"	4:58
8.	"Momma's Boy"	2:49
9.	"Call Me Up"	4:11
10.	"Waiting 4 U"	3:47
11.	"100%"	6:00

Deluxe edition bonus music videos
No.	Title	Length
12.	"Fancy Footwork"	3:22
13.	"Bonafied Lovin"	3:50
14.	"Tenderoni"	3:34
15.	"Needy Girl"	3:59
16.	"I Am Somebody" (DJ Mehdi featuring Chromeo)	3:20

Deluxe edition bonus disc
No.	Title	Length
1.	"Needy Girl"	4:17
2.	"Rage!"	4:35
3.	"You're So Gangsta"	4:03
4.	"I Am Somebody" (DJ Mehdi featuring Chromeo)	3:10
5.	"Tenderoni" (MSTRKRFT Remix)	4:45
6.	"Fancy Footwork" (Crookers Remix)	5:28
7.	"Needy Girl" (Lifelike Remix)	7:05
8.	"Bonafied Lovin" (Yuksek Remix)	4:25
9.	"Me & My Man" (Whitey vs. Chromeo Fly Whitey Remix)	4:03
10.	"You're So Gangsta" (Playgroup Remix)	5:48
11.	"Destination: Overdrive" (DFA Remix)	5:37
12.	"Fancy Footwork" (Laidback Luke Remix)	6:37
13.	"Bonafied Lovin" (Jori Hulkkonen Remix)	9:02

Fancier Footwork
No.	Title	Length
1.	"Needy Girl"	4:17
2.	"Rage!"	4:34
3.	"You're So Gangsta"	4:01
4.	"Needy Girl" (Lifelike Remix)	7:04
5.	"Me & My Man" (Whitey Remix)	4:08
6.	"You're So Gangsta" (Playgroup Remix)	5:58
7.	"Destination: Overdrive" (DFA Remix)	5:48
8.	"Bonafied Lovin" (Jori Hulkkonen Remix)	9:07
9.	"Bonafied Lovin" (Riot in Belgium & Ooh Ee Remix)	4:55
10.	"Bonafied Lovin" (Les Petits Pilous Remix)	3:37
11.	"Bonafied Lovin" (Sweetlight Remix)	6:32
12.	"Tenderoni" (MSTRKRFT Remix)	4:46
13.	"Tenderoni" (Étienne de Crécy Remix)	6:00
14.	"Tenderoni" (Proxy Distort Mix)	4:15
15.	"Tenderoni" (Sinden Remix)	4:43
16.	"Fancy Footwork" (D.I.M. Remix)	6:31
17.	"Fancy Footwork" (Tomas Barfod Remix)	6:29
18.	"Fancy Footwork" (Surkin Rogue Teens Remix)	5:04

== Personnel ==
Credits adapted from the liner notes of Fancy Footwork.

- Chromeo – executive producer, instruments, production, recording, vocals
- Coralie Bailleuil – image manipulation
- Adrien Blanchat – image manipulation
- Jean-Charles de Castelbajac – shoes
- Coco – additional female vocals (tracks 1, 4)
- Simon Davey – mastering
- Charlotte Delarue – art direction
- Sébastien Gerbi – mixing assistance
- Adrian "A-Dogg" Harpham – percussion, rototoms (track 3)
- Craig Hodgson – saxophone (track 11)
- Kevin Kocher – management
- Roxane Lagache – model
- Farah Malick – additional female vocals (track 5)
- Santiago Marotto – art direction
- Mart One – percussion (track 2)
- Samy Osta – recording (tracks 4, 6, 8, 9)
- Ozzie – additional female vocals (track 3)
- Harry Peccinotti – photography
- Jérémie Rozan – art direction
- Oliver Sasse – project coordinator for Turbo Recordings
- Greg Smith – recording (tracks 1–3, 5, 7, 10, 11)
- Tiga – executive producer
- Melisa Young – additional vocals (track 9)
- Philippe Zdar – mixing

== Charts ==
Chart performance for Fancy Footwork
Chart (2007)	Peak position
US Top Dance Albums (Billboard)	11
US Heatseekers Albums (Billboard)	25

== Release history ==
Region	Date	Format	Edition	Label	Ref.
Canada	May 8, 2007	CD; digital download	Standard	Turbo; Last Gang	
Australia	May 26, 2007	CD; digital download	Standard	Modular	
United States	June 19, 2007	CD; digital download	Standard	Vice	
Germany	June 22, 2007	CD	Standard	V2; Turbo	
Japan	July 4, 2007	CD; digital download	Standard	KSR	
United Kingdom	July 22, 2007	Digital download	Standard	Back Yard	
United Kingdom	July 30, 2007	CD	Standard	Back Yard	
Canada	June 3, 2008	Digital download	Fancier Footwork	Turbo; Last Gang	
Canada	July 3, 2008	CD	Deluxe	Vice	
United States	July 8, 2008	CD; LP; digital download	Deluxe	Vice	
