= Oliver (DJs) =

American music production duo

- Origin: Los Angeles, United States
- Genres: Electronic; electro house; nu disco; electropop
- Occupations: DJs; record producers
- Years active: 2010–2019
- Labels: Interscope; Fool's Gold
- Past members: Vaughn Oliver; Oliver Goldstein

Oliver was an American electronic music production and DJ duo, consisting of Vaughn Oliver and Oliver Goldstein, based in Los Angeles.

== Career ==
Vaughn (also known as U-Tern) and Goldstein (also known as Oligee), were hip hop and scratch DJs in the 1990s. Vaughn, upon moving to Vancouver, started DJing in clubs and radio shows, while Goldstein played in bands and made beats in the studio. While living separately by distance, they communicated by Skype and produced music by sending each other parts via the internet. Oliver has worked with Shakira, Britney Spears, and Kelly Clarkson as a producer and songwriter.

Their debut studio album titled Full Circle, which featured collaborations with Chromeo, MNDR, Sam Sparro, De La Soul and Yelle, was released via Interscope Records on August 25, 2017, alongside singles titled "Heart Attack" featuring De La Soul, "Electrify" and "Chemicals". Speaking about the album, they said "We're not really paying attention too much to what's happening with electronic music." The song "Electrify" has received over 1.8 million streams on Spotify and was included in the official soundtrack of EA Sports' FIFA 17. In the years before 2014, they released the extended plays titled Dirty Talk (2012), Mechanical (2013) and Light Years Away (2014). In an interview, Vaughn noted his dream collaborations to be Prince, Quincy Jones and Daft Punk. A remix EP of Mechanical was released, featuring remixes from Tchami, Dillon Francis, Values and Nom De Strip. Their song "MYB" was featured on Annie Mac's BBC Radio 1 show. Earlier in 2017, they featured on the Leon Else song "The City Don't Care", which was released via What Are We Doing/Interscope Records.

On October 23, 2019, Vaughn announced on their official Twitter account that no plans were set for any future albums/tours, and that they (Goldstein and he) hadn't worked together on music for over a year, citing professional issues. Vaughn intends to sporadically release under the Oliver name, but states that his focus has been on producing and sound engineering for other artists.

== Discography ==
=== Studio albums ===
- Full Circle (2017)

=== Extended plays ===
- Dirty Talk (2012)
- Mechanical (2013)
- Light Years Away (2014)
- Inner Circle (2018)

=== Singles ===
- Oliver featuring Scott Mellis – "Electrify" (2016)
- Leon Else featuring Oliver – "The City Don't Care" (2017)
- Oliver featuring De La Soul – "Heart Attack" (2017)
- Oliver featuring MNDR – "Chemicals" (2017)

=== Remixes ===
- Don Diablo featuring Dragonette - "Animale" (Oliver Remix)
- Chromeo – "Hot Mess" (Oliver Remix)
- Juan Atkins - "Dayshift" (Oliver's Nightshift Remix)
- Penguin Prison – "Fair Warning" (Oliver Remix)
- Britney Spears - "I Wanna Go" (Oliver Remix)
- Housse de Racket - "Roman" (Oliver Remix)
- Sneaky Sound System – "Big" (Oliver Remix)
- Childish Gambino - “Heartbeat” (Oliver Remix)
- Smalltown DJs featuring Alanna Stuart - "Love Decoy" (Oliver Remix)
- Foster The People – "Don't Stop" (Oliver Remix)
- Punks Jump Up – "Mr. Overtime" (Oliver Remix)
- Breakbot – "One Out Of Two" (Oliver Remix)
- Live Element - "Be Free" (Oliver Remix)
- Aeroplane – "We Can't Fly" (Oliver Remix)
- Black Van – "Inside" (Oliver Remix)
- Gigamesh - "Enjoy" (Oliver Remix)
- Kris Menace featuring Black Hills – "Waiting For You" (Oliver Remix)
- Blondie – "Heart Of Glass" (Oliver & Thee Mike B Remix)
- Mayer Hawthorne - "Her Favorite Song" (Oliver Remix)
- Bonnie McKee - "American Girl" (Oliver Remix)
- Donna Summer - "Love Is In Control (Finger On The Trigger)" [Chromeo & Oliver Remix]
- Boys Noize featuring Siriusmo - "Conchord" (Oliver Remix)
- Big Data – "Dangerous" (Oliver Remix)
- Madeon featuring Kyan - "You're On" (Oliver Remix)
- Club Cheval - "From the Basement to the Roof" (Oliver Remix)
- Jack Ü featuring AlunaGeorge - "To Ü" (Oliver Remix)
- BØRNS - "Electric Love" (Oliver Remix)
- Fred Falke featuring Elohim & Mansions on the Moon - "It's A Memory" (Oliver Remix)
- Leon Else - "Dance" (Oliver Remix)
- Grey featuring Bahari - "I Miss You" (Oliver Remix)
- Collapsing Scenery – "Straight World" (Oliver Mix)
- Tove Lo - “Disco Tits” (Oliver Remix)
- The Knocks & Captain Cuts - "House Party" (Oliver Disco Mixx)
- Beck – "Up All Night" (Oliver Remix)
- Kavinsky - "Renegade" (Oliver Remix)
