= Business Casual (Chromeo album) =

2010 studio album by Chromeo

Studio album by Chromeo
- Released: September 14, 2010
- Studio: Metrosonic (Brooklyn) (Note: Tracks 1, 2, 4, 5, 7, 8 and 10); Clinton Recording (Manhattan) (Note: Tracks 3, 6 and 9; additional recording on track 2); The Studio (Philadelphia) (Note: Additional recording on tracks 7 and 8); Masterkut (Montreal) (Note: Additional recording on track 9); Endangered Species (Montreal) (Note: All tracks)
- Genre: Electro-funk; nu-disco
- Length: 39:35
- Label: Last Gang; Turbo
- Producer: Chromeo

Chromeo chronology
Fancy Footwork (2007)	Business Casual (2010)	White Women (2014)

Singles from Business Casual
- 1. "Night by Night" Released: September 22, 2009; 2. "Don't Turn the Lights On" Released: June 28, 2010; 3. "Hot Mess" Released: February 7, 2011; 4. "When the Night Falls" Released: July 25, 2011

Business Casual is the third studio album by Canadian electro-funk duo Chromeo, released on September 14, 2010, by Last Gang Records and Turbo Recordings. The album is Chromeo's major-label debut, following the duo's signing to Atlantic Records. Upon its release, Business Casual was met with generally positive reviews from music critics. Four singles were released from the album: "Night by Night", "Don't Turn the Lights On", "Hot Mess", and "When the Night Falls".

== Promotion ==
The album's lead single, "Night by Night", was released on September 22, 2009 as a free download through Green Label Sound, a Mountain Dew-sponsored record label. The Jérémie Rozan-directed music video, which was also funded by Mountain Dew, was filmed at a warehouse in Greenpoint, Brooklyn. Chromeo performed "Night by Night" on Late Show with David Letterman on September 20, 2010.

"Don't Turn the Lights On" was released on June 28, 2010, as the second single from Business Casual, and its music video was directed by Keith Schofield.

"Hot Mess" served as the album's third single. An alternative version of the song featuring Elly Jackson of La Roux was released in the United Kingdom on February 7, 2011, while the original version was released in the United States on February 15 and in Canada on March 1. The accompanying video, directed by Jérémie Rozan, was shot in Dumbo, Brooklyn. The duo performed "Hot Mess" on Conan on February 21, 2011.

"When the Night Falls" was released on July 25, 2011, as the album's fourth and final single. The song's video was directed by Daniels and features Solange Knowles, who also provides additional vocals for the track.

== Critical reception ==
Professional ratings
Aggregate scores
Source	Rating
Metacritic	68/100
Review scores
Source	Rating
AllMusic	3/5 stars
The A.V. Club	B+
Entertainment Weekly	B
NME	6/10
Now	2/5
Pitchfork	6.9/10
PopMatters	7/10
Slant Magazine	3.5/5 stars
Spin	3.5/5 stars
URB	4/5 stars

Business Casual received generally positive reviews from music critics. At Metacritic, which assigns a normalised rating out of 100 to reviews from mainstream publications, the album received an average of 68, based on 19 reviews, which indicates "generally favorable reviews". Simon Vozick-Levinson of Entertainment Weekly wrote that despite the duo's major-label deal, "[o]n Business Casual they remain adept students of the Hall & Oates school of hooks, which they surround with gleaming synth grooves and robotic talkbox solos that recall '80s funk masters like Zapp & Roger." Chris Martins of The A.V. Club stated that the album "opens with a powerful three-part salvo crafted for maximum dance-floor penetration. [...] But as the album progresses, an unexpected soulfulness emerges". Anupa Mistry of URB remarked, "The defining thread running through Chromeo's body of work is earnestness: you might scoff at the Lothario-obsession, the legs on display in the artwork, the almost-religious adherence to '80s stylistics, but in the end you either have to a) give it up for their studiousness, or b) just dance." Marc Hogan of Spin opined that Business Casual's "libidinous wit can't quite match 2007's Fancy Footwork, but this day at the office still features booty calls, romantic squabbles, and digitally syrupy declarations of devotion."

Slant Magazine's Jesse Cataldo found the album to be "transparent and tacky enough that its not becoming insufferable is a triumph in itself. Its earnestness, and the enthusiasm which it presents its reconstituted '80s sounds, is even lovable." AJ Ramirez of PopMatters felt that "Chromeo still won't win any points for originally [sic] or distinctiveness", but noted, "For the majority of its runtime, Business Casual booms with the allure of a greatest hits collection, and actually stands as a more consistent work than the full-length efforts of many of Chromeo's influences." AllMusic's Jason Lymangrover commented that the album has "the typically synth-suave electro-funk jams [...] As the album progresses, though, [the duo] dig[s] deeper into crates for cheesy inspiration, and you can hear glimmers of Rockwell, Lionel Richie, Oran Juice, and even The Kids from Fame TV series." Pitchfork's Larry Fitzmaurice suggested that the album's "most successful moments are the result of genre-related leg-stretching", adding that "the record is a unique situation, as it represents Chromeo's growth as master arrangers and producers, despite feeling like a step backwards in overall quality." Kevin Ritchie of Now concluded that "Business Casual has a few bangers, but over the course of an album, the synth soloing gets old fast. Still, while we wait for a pop saviour to take the genre forward, Chromeo provide a nice enough tribute to its past." In a review for NME, Mike Williams expressed that "Phillippe Zdar's production is a deluxe weave of dreamy synths, biting snares, throbbing bass and warbly Vocoders, but it feels as if Chromeo are just doodling knobs over the top."

== Track listing ==
All tracks are written by Chromeo.

No.	Title	Length
1.	"Hot Mess"	3:40
2.	"I'm Not Contagious"	3:39
3.	"Night by Night"	3:47
4.	"Don't Turn the Lights On"	4:33
5.	"You Make It Rough"	7:18
6.	"When the Night Falls"	3:45
7.	"Don't Walk Away"	3:31
8.	"J'ai claqué la porte"	2:26
9.	"The Right Type"	3:54
10.	"Grow Up"	3:02

Deluxe edition and Japanese edition bonus tracks
No.	Title	Length
11.	"Night by Night" (Skream Remix)	3:59
12.	"Night by Night" (Siriusmo Remix)	4:37
13.	"Don't Turn the Lights On" (Aeroplane Remix)	5:35
14.	"Don't Turn the Lights On" (Christian Martin Remix)	5:05

Canadian iTunes Store deluxe edition bonus tracks
No.	Title	Length
15.	"Momma's Boy" (live)	4:42
16.	"I Could Be Wrong" (featuring Ezra Koenig)	4:01
17.	"Don't Turn the Lights On" (video)	4:33
18.	"Night by Night" (video)	3:50

US iTunes Store deluxe edition bonus tracks
No.	Title	Length
11.	"I Could Be Wrong" (featuring Ezra Koenig)	4:01
12.	"Night by Night" (Skream Remix)	3:57
13.	"Night by Night" (Siriusmo Remix)	4:34
14.	"Don't Turn the Lights On" (Aeroplane Remix)	5:33
15.	"Don't Turn the Lights On" (Christian Martin Remix)	5:05
16.	"Don't Turn the Lights On" (video)	4:35
17.	"Night by Night" (video)	3:51

UK iTunes Store deluxe edition bonus tracks
No.	Title	Length
11.	"Hot Mess" (featuring Elly Jackson)	3:34
12.	"Hot Mess" (Duck Sauce Remix) (featuring Elly Jackson)	5:27
13.	"Night by Night" (Skream Remix)	3:59
14.	"Don't Turn the Lights On" (Aeroplane Remix)	4:01

== Personnel ==
Credits adapted from the liner notes of Business Casual.

=== Musicians ===
- Chromeo – all vocals, instruments (all tracks)
- Kesh – additional vocals (track 1)
- Solange Knowles – additional vocals (track 6)
- Adrian Harpham – tom solos (tracks 1, 5)
- Ezekiel Wexley – guitar (track 8)
- Tom Smith – saxophone (track 5)
- Larry Gold – string arrangements, string conducting (tracks 7, 8)

=== Technical ===
- Chromeo – production, recording (all tracks); additional recording (track 9); executive production
- Jon Martinez – recording assistance
- Teruhisa Uchiyama – recording assistance
- Lawson White – recording (tracks 3, 6, 9); additional recording (track 2)
- A-Trak – additional recording (track 2); consigliere
- Jeff Chestek – additional recording (tracks 7, 8)
- Rick Friedrich – additional recording assistance (tracks 7, 8)
- Greg Smith – additional recording assistance (track 9)
- Zdar – mixing (Note: Mixed at Motorbass Studio (Paris))
- Julien Naudin – mixing assistance
- Simon Davey – mastering (Note: Mastered at The Exchange (London)) (tracks 1, 2, 5–10)
- Mike Marsh – mastering (track 3)
- Emily Lazar – mastering (Note: Mastered at The Lodge (New York City)) (track 4)
- Joe LaPorta – mastering (track 4)
- Tiga – executive production
- Kevin Kocher – project coordination
- Oliver Sasse – project coordination
- Adrien Fillon – additional co-production

=== Technical ===
- Jérémie Rozan – art direction
- Charlotte Delarue – art direction
- Harri Peccinotti – photography
- Adrien Blanchat – image manipulation
- Marjorie Van Hoegaerden – model

== Charts ==
Chart performance for Business Casual
Chart (2010)	Peak position
Australian Dance Albums (ARIA)	20
Canadian Albums (Nielsen SoundScan)	44
UK Albums (OCC)	151
UK Independent Albums (OCC)	18
US Billboard 200	70
US Top Dance Albums (Billboard)	4

== Release history ==
Release history for Business Casual
Region	Date	Format	Edition	Label	Ref(s)
Canada	September 14, 2010	CD; digital download	Standard; deluxe	Last Gang; Turbo	
United States	September 14, 2010	CD; digital download	Standard; deluxe	Big Beat; Atlantic	
United States	September 14, 2010	LP	Standard	Big Beat; Atlantic	
Japan	September 14, 2010	Digital download	Standard	KSR	
Japan	September 15, 2010	CD + DVD	Standard	KSR	
Australia	September 17, 2010	CD; digital download	Standard	Modular	
Germany	September 17, 2010	CD; digital download	Standard	!K7	
France	September 21, 2010	Digital download	Standard	!K7	
United Kingdom	September 26, 2010	Digital download	Standard	Back Yard	
United Kingdom	September 27, 2010	CD	Standard	Back Yard	
France	October 13, 2010	CD	Standard	!K7	
Canada	November 16, 2010	LP	Standard	Last Gang; Turbo	
United Kingdom	February 6, 2011	Digital download	Deluxe	Back Yard	
