= White Women (album) =

Studio album by Chromeo
- Released: May 12, 2014
- Studios: The Mothership (Montreal) (Note: All tracks); Pulse Recording (Los Angeles) (Note: Tracks 1, 2, 4–7, 9, 11 and 12; backing vocals on track 1); The Cutting Room (New York City); Sunset Lodge (Los Angeles) (Note: Track 2); Avatar (New York City) (Note: Strings on track 12)
- Genre: Electro-funk
- Length: 53:22
- Label: Last Gang
- Producers: Chromeo; Oliver

Chromeo chronology
Business Casual (2010)	White Women (2014)	Head Over Heels (2018)

Singles from White Women
- 1. "Over Your Shoulder" Released: October 29, 2013; 2. "Come Alive" Released: January 7, 2014; 3. "Sexy Socialite" Released: January 10, 2014; 4. "Jealous (I Ain't with It)" Released: March 4, 2014; 5. "Old 45's" Released: January 16, 2015

White Women is the fourth studio album by Canadian electro-funk duo Chromeo, released on May 12, 2014, by Last Gang Records. The album features contributions from Vampire Weekend's Ezra Koenig, Toro y Moi, Solange Knowles, LCD Soundsystem's Pat Mahoney, and Fool's Gold duo Oliver.

Upon its release, the album was met with generally positive reviews from music critics. White Women entered the Canadian Albums Chart at number six with first-week sales of 3,500 copies. It also debuted at number 11 on the Billboard 200, selling 16,000 copies in its first week, and became the duo's first album to chart in the United Kingdom, debuting at number 42 on the UK Albums Chart with 1,940 copies sold. The album spawned five singles: "Over Your Shoulder", "Sexy Socialite", "Come Alive", "Jealous (I Ain't with It)", and "Old 45's".

== Background and release ==
White Women was announced on September 9, 2013, along with a Jérémie Rozan-directed teaser featuring the song "Over Your Shoulder". The following night, Chromeo performed at Boiler Room in New York City, where the duo debuted new music. Chromeo described the album as "Larry David funk", which singer Dave "Dave 1" Macklovitch defined as "a combination of sexy, funky, macho music with neurotically love-torn lyrics". Macklovitch stated that the duo aimed to "take it back to the real careless dance party vibes", in contrast to their previous album, Business Casual (2010), which he said was "a little more serious and moody". "There's more guitar, there's more bass, there are string arrangements; it feels more alive to me", Macklovitch said.

On September 18, 2013, the duo hosted an "Ask Me Anything" (AMA) session on Reddit to reveal upcoming collaborations with Vampire Weekend's Ezra Koenig, Toro y Moi, Solange Knowles, LCD Soundsystem's Pat Mahoney, and Fool's Gold duo Oliver. Chromeo had previously collaborated with Koenig on the song "I Could Be Wrong", a bonus track from the duo's third studio album, Business Casual. According to Macklovitch, including guest artists was part of changing Chromeo's studio approach for their fourth album. "Instead of working in a vacuum, we were working in an open, more curatorial environment. It's harder to work and have people come to the studio, listen to what you're doing, and then integrate and synthesize what they say into the music than to work in a vacuum. That's what we tried to do as an artistic challenge", he said.

During their AMA session, the duo also elaborated on the inspiration behind the album's title, stating: "We chose the title because it's the name of the first Helmut Newton book. He's a huge influence on us...you know, the legs, that 80s sexy look. And we thought the title was ballsy, funny, was going to get people thinking. Our music always blurred boundaries between past and present (is it retro? is it modern? is it both?) and now we want to blur boundaries between gender and race as well." Chromeo unveiled the cover art and release date for the album via a missed connections ad on Craigslist on February 14, 2014. On May 6, the album was made available to stream in full at iTunes Radio.

== Singles and promotion ==
The album's lead single, "Over Your Shoulder", was released on October 29, 2013. "Come Alive", featuring vocals from Toro y Moi, was released as the album's second single in the United Kingdom and Ireland on January 7, 2014, and as the third single in Canada on January 21 and in the United States on February 24. The accompanying music video for "Come Alive" was directed by Alex Southam and debuted on January 30, 2014.

"Sexy Socialite", which features former LCD Soundsystem member Pat Mahoney on drums, was released as the album's third single in Ireland on January 10, 2014, and in the UK on January 12, and as the second single in the US on January 20 and in Canada on January 21. "Jealous (I Ain't with It)" was released on March 4, 2014, as the album's fourth single, for which a video was directed by Ryan Hope and premiered on March 18. The album's fifth single, "Old 45's", was released on January 16, 2015; the music video, directed by Dugan O'Neal and featuring appearances from Haim and Jon Heder, debuted on September 30, 2014.

Chromeo performed "Sexy Socialite" with Death from Above 1979 on Late Night with Jimmy Fallon on October 29, 2013. On January 6, 2014, Chromeo announced the Come Alive Tour, which visited North America and select European cities from January 9 to June 6. On April 21, the duo appeared on Jimmy Kimmel Live! to perform "Jealous (I Ain't with It)" and "Come Alive". Chromeo also performed "Jealous (I Ain't with It)" on Late Show with David Letterman on May 16. On June 24, 2014, the duo announced the Frequent Flyer Tour in support of White Women, which commenced at Glastonbury Festival on June 27 and concluded in Eugene, Oregon, on October 29.

== Critical reception ==
Professional ratings
Aggregate scores
Source	Rating
Metacritic	66/100
Review scores
Source	Rating
AllMusic	3.5/5 stars
Exclaim!	8/10
The Guardian	3/5 stars
NME	3/10
Now	3/5
Paste	8.5/10
Pitchfork	7.6/10
PopMatters	7/10
Rolling Stone	3.5/5 stars
Spin	7/10

White Women received generally positive reviews from music critics. At Metacritic, which assigns a normalized rating out of 100 to reviews from mainstream publications, the album received an average score of 66, based on 24 reviews. Stephen Carlick of Exclaim! lauded the album as "the best Chromeo record yet, a seamless combination of energy and melancholy, disco and soul, all mixed together into some of the most effective songs they've written", while also calling it "consistently fun and well-crafted, a shining example of disco's renewed relevance from a pair of musicians for whom the genre never went out of style." David Jeffries of AllMusic dubbed the album "an equally titillating, prose-free, and '80s-embracing effort" and described it as "fun, frivolous, and floor-filling stuff where that slick '80s flair is gloriously bolstered by that modern dancefloor punch." Pitchfork's Jordan Sargent wrote, "[W]ith no classic hanging over their heads and no true expectations, it's easy to be seduced by their quietly fantastic fourth album White Women", adding that the album is "the closest Chromeo have come yet to fully realizing their sound, but it's also far from perfect." Will Salmon of Clash noted that "there's a playful sense of bawdy humour at work across White Women. Some may find the irony unpalatable, but there's little denying Chromeo's cheeky pop mastery."

Rolling Stone's Nick Murray expressed that the duo's "disco revival isn't quite as cheeky as similar efforts from, say, Duck Sauce [...] but songs like 'Sexy Socialite' are clearly meant as clever fun all the same." Jonathan Zwickel of Spin commented, "It's not that Chromeo's run out of ideas—they've been a one-idea band all along. But now they've got more of the world singing along, so their brand of fun suddenly means a little bit more." Benjamin Aspray of PopMatters opined, "For every track that mines neurotic hetero-masculinity for laughs, [...] another is more charitable, which is to say more sentimental. This isn't necessarily a dealbreaker." Benjamin Boles of Now stated that "the novelty disco elements are balanced by enough rock-solid grooves that the cheesier moments don't stink up the whole thing." The Guardian's Lanre Bakare observed that "there are more sophisticated elements at play" on the album, but felt that "[t]he comedy lyrics and tongue-in-cheek delivery mask the fact that behind the japes there are some brilliant songwriting chops." In a negative review, Leonie Cooper of NME found the album to be "so dripping with awkward, wink-wink irony that it's utterly impossible to appreciate the Hall & Oates style synth pop that underpins the yacht rocking groove of 'Old 45s'", and concluded, "Even a run of solid guest stars [...] can't pump any passion into this flaccid cringe-fest."

The album was a longlisted nominee for the 2014 Polaris Music Prize.

== Commercial performance ==
White Women entered the Canadian Albums Chart at number six with 3,500 copies sold in its first week, becoming Chromeo's highest-peaking album in their native Canada. In the United States, it debuted at number 11 on the Billboard 200 with first-week sales of 16,000 copies, earning the duo their highest-peaking album on the chart to date. White Women sold 1,940 copies to debut at number 42 on the UK Albums Chart, the duo's first album to chart in the United Kingdom.

== Track listing ==
No.	Title	Writer(s)	Producer(s)	Length
1.	"Jealous (I Ain't with It)"	David Macklovitch; Patrick Gemayel; Oliver Goldstein	Chromeo; Oliver	3:48
2.	"Come Alive" (featuring Toro y Moi)	Macklovitch; Gemayel; Chaz Bundick	Chromeo; Oligee^{[a]}	3:58
3.	"Over Your Shoulder"	Macklovitch; Gemayel	Chromeo	4:32
4.	"Sexy Socialite"	Macklovitch; Gemayel	Chromeo; Oligee^{[b]}	5:36
5.	"Lost on the Way Home" (featuring Solange)	Macklovitch; Gemayel; Solange Knowles; Justin Meldal-Johnsen	Chromeo; Oligee^{[a]}	5:24
6.	"Play the Fool"	Macklovitch; Gemayel	Chromeo; Oligee^{[b]}	5:15
7.	"Hard to Say No"	Macklovitch; Gemayel	Chromeo; Oligee^{[a]}	3:35
8.	"Ezra's Interlude" (featuring Ezra Koenig)	Macklovitch; Gemayel; Koenig	Chromeo	1:54
9.	"Old 45's"	Macklovitch; Gemayel; Goldstein; Vaughn Oliver	Oliver; Chromeo^{[b]}	3:47
10.	"Somethingood"	Macklovitch; Gemayel	Chromeo	6:30
11.	"Frequent Flyer"	Macklovitch; Gemayel; Goldstein; Oliver	Oliver; Chromeo^{[a]}	3:13
12.	"Fall Back 2U"	Macklovitch; Gemayel	Chromeo; Oligee^{[b]}	5:50

=== Notes ===
- ^{^[a]} signifies a co-producer
- ^{^[b]} signifies an additional producer

== Personnel ==
Credits adapted from the liner notes of White Women.

=== Musicians ===
- Chromeo – all instruments (tracks 1–8, 10, 12); guitar (track 9)
- Oliver – all instruments (tracks 1, 9)
- Noelle Scaggs – backing vocals (track 1)
- Toro y Moi – vocals (track 2)
- Oligee – all instruments (tracks 2, 5, 7)
- Erika Spring – backing vocals (tracks 2, 6, 7)
- Asian Dan – extra bass bits (track 3)
- Tawatha Agee – backing vocals (tracks 3, 4, 10, 11)
- Pat Mahoney – drums (track 4)
- Ozzie – rap (track 4)
- Solange – vocals (track 5)
- Adrian "A-Dogg" Harpham – drums (track 5)
- Paul Pesco – guitar (track 6)
- Taku Hirano – percussion (tracks 6, 7, 10)
- Ezra Koenig – vocals, all instruments (track 8)
- Thad DeBrock – guitar (track 9)
- Louisahhh!!! – rap (track 11)
- Ben Jacobs – pilot (track 11)
- James Casey – saxophone (track 12)
- Rob Mounsey – string arrangement (track 12)
- Dave Eggar – string section (track 12)
- Rachel Goulb – string section (track 12)
- Julie Goodale – string section (track 12)
- Katie Kresek – string section (track 12)
- Tod Low – string section (track 12)
- Pat Mangan – string section (track 12)
- Peter Schön – string section (track 12)
- Entcho Todorov – string section (track 12)

=== Technical ===
- Chromeo – production (tracks 1–8, 10, 12); recording (all tracks); additional production (track 9); co-production (track 11)
- Oliver – production (tracks 1, 9, 11)
- Tom Gardner – recording
- Sean Walsh – additional vocal production (track 1)
- Manny Marroquin – mixing (track 1)
- Chris Galland – mixing assistance (track 1)
- Delbert Bowers – mixing assistance (track 1)
- Oligee – co-production (tracks 2, 5, 7); additional production (tracks 4, 6, 12)
- Dave Bascombe – mixing (tracks 2–12)
- Greg Marriott – mixing assistance (tracks 2–4, 6, 8, 10–12)
- Rommel Villanueva – recording (track 5)
- Scott Knapper – mixing assistance (tracks 7, 10, 11)
- Mario J. McNulty – string recording (track 12)
- Stuart Hawkes – mastering
- Kevin Kocher – executive production
- Tha Funk Lordz – executive production
- A-Trak – consigliere

=== Artwork ===
- Jérémie Rozan – art direction, back cover photo
- Charlotte Delarue – art direction
- Timothy Saccenti – photography
- Adrien Blanchat – image manipulation
- Malik Lacheheb – image manipulation
- Benjamin Bastide – image manipulation
- Karen Soto – model

== Charts ==
=== Weekly charts ===
Weekly chart performance for White Women
Chart (2014)	Peak position
Australian Albums (ARIA)	50
Australian Dance Albums (ARIA)	9
Belgian Albums (Ultratop Flanders)	82
Belgian Albums (Ultratop Wallonia)	117
Canadian Albums (Billboard)	6
French Albums (SNEP)	182
Irish Albums (IRMA)	70
Scottish Albums (Official Charts)	72
Swiss Albums (Schweizer Hitparade)	49
UK Albums (Official Charts)	42
US Billboard 200	11
US Top Dance Albums (Billboard)	1

=== Year-end charts ===
Year-end chart performance for White Women
Chart (2014)	Position
US Top Dance/Electronic Albums (Billboard)	21

== Release history ==
Release dates and formats for White Women
Region	Date	Format(s)	Label	Ref.
Canada	May 12, 2014	CD; LP; digital download	Last Gang	
France	May 12, 2014	CD; LP; digital download	Warner	
Japan	May 12, 2014	Digital download	Warner	
United Kingdom	May 12, 2014	CD; LP; digital download	Parlophone	
United States	May 12, 2014	CD; LP; digital download	Big Beat; Atlantic	
Australia	May 16, 2014	CD; LP; digital download	Warner	
Germany	May 16, 2014	CD; digital download	Parlophone	
