= Chromeo =

Canadian electro-funk musical duo

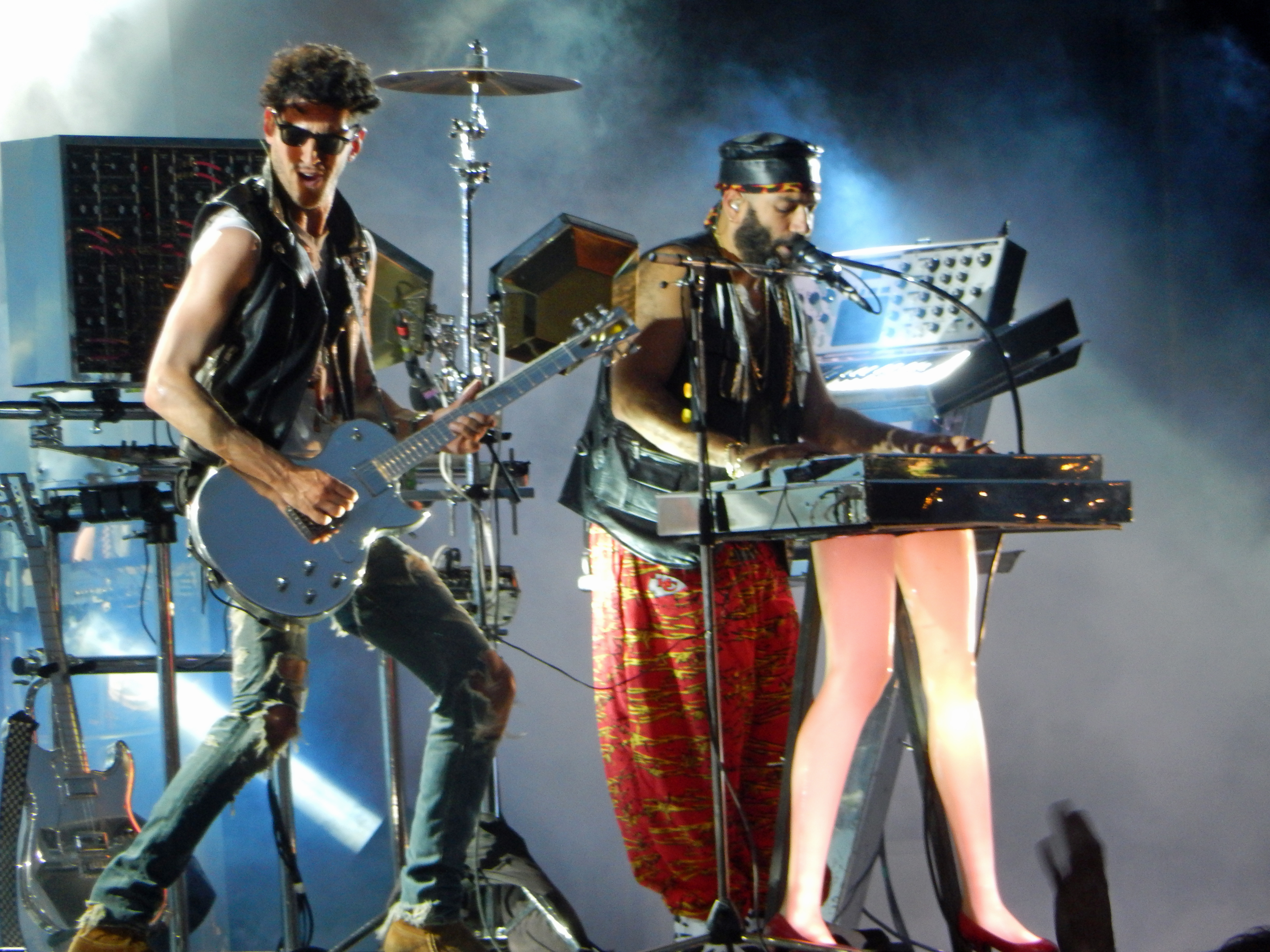
- David Macklovitch (left) and Patrick Gemayel performing at the North Coast Music Fest in 2015.

Background information
- Origin: Montreal, Quebec, Canada
- Genres: Electro-funk; nu-disco; synth-pop; dance-rock
- Works: Chromeo discography
- Years active: 2002–present
- Labels: Juliet; Turbo; Vice; Back Yard; V2; Modular; Last Gang; Big Beat; Atlantic; Parlophone
- Members: David Macklovitch (Dave 1); Patrick Gemayel (P-Thugg)
- Website: chromeo.net

Signature
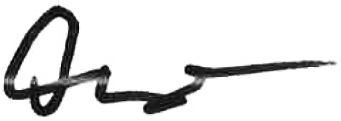

Chromeo is a Canadian electro-funk duo from Montreal, formed in 2002 by musicians David "Dave 1" Macklovitch and Patrick "P-Thugg" Gemayel. Their sound draws from soul music, dance music, rock, synth-pop, disco and funk.

As of 2024, the band has released six studio albums, with three of them hitting the Billboard 200 charts. In 2018, Chromeo received their first Grammy Award nomination for Best Engineered Album, Non-Classical for their album Head over Heels.

== History ==
The duo met in the mid-1990s at Collège Stanislas in Montreal. Speaking on their different ethnic backgrounds, the two jokingly describe themselves as "the only successful Arab/Jewish partnership since the dawn of human culture."

Around the time when they were both 15, Macklovitch joined Gemayel's band. During this time, Macklovitch's younger brother A-Trak started winning the Disco Mix Club Championships, becoming World Champion in 1997. After the band, Dave 1 and P-Thugg started to produce hip hop music together. Also at this time, Tiga was working with Dave 1 at a record store and asked Dave 1 to work on a project for his label, Turbo. Dave 1 and P-Thugg signed as Chromeo and started creating music together.

Reviews of their 2004 debut album, She's in Control, were mostly favorable. Critics compared the sound to 1980s groups Hall & Oates, Zapp, Prince, Klymaxx and Sylvester. "Needy Girl" became a worldwide club hit. According to Dave 1, "She's in Control didn't blow up. But we had "Needy Girl", and "Needy Girl" was like a musical passport. That song went all around the world and DJs played it everywhere". The song "You're So Gangsta" was featured as the theme tune for the PC game Space Colony.

In 2005, Chromeo released a mix CD of funky dance tracks on Eskimo Belgium records entitled Un Joli Mix Pour Toi (French for: A Nice Mix for You). In 2006, the group was featured in DJ Mehdi's song "I Am Somebody". During early 2007, Chromeo supported indie rock group Bloc Party on their British tour.

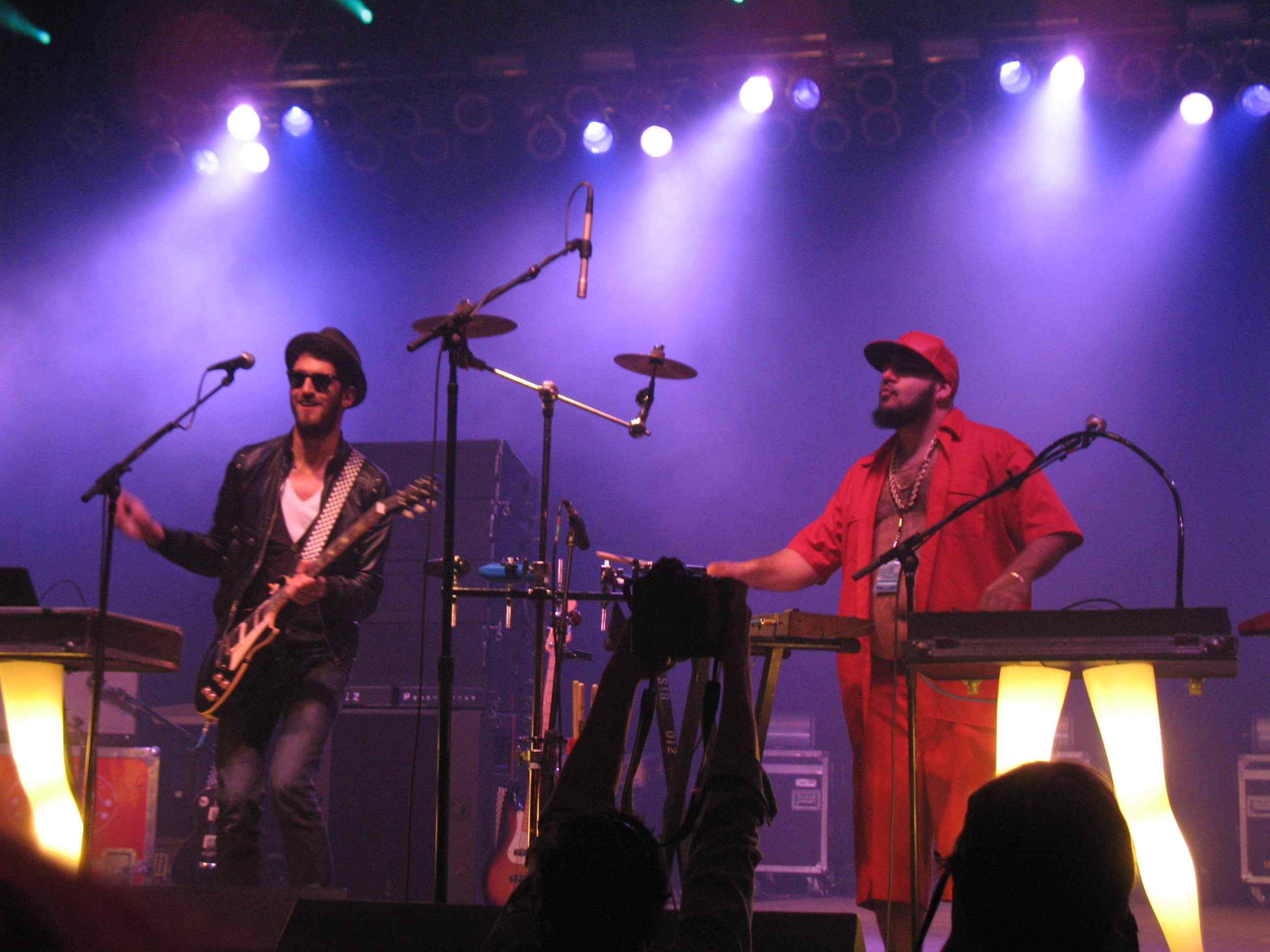
Chromeo at the Bonnaroo Music Festival in 2008

After a three-year break, they released a second album, Fancy Footwork, which also received positive reviews. In 2008, Chromeo performed with Daryl Hall as a part of his online series Live from Daryl's House. They also performed with Hall at the 2010 Bonnaroo Music & Arts Festival in Manchester, TN. On a 2009 episode of Yo Gabba Gabba!, Chromeo appeared performing original song "Nice 'N Clean".

Chromeo released their third studio album, Business Casual, on 14 September 2010. As of 2025, the music video for the album's single "Night by Night" had received over 6.1 million views on YouTube. The band has appeared on KCRW's Morning Becomes Eclectic, been on the cover of Future Magazine, and sold out The Forum in London.

At the beginning of March 2011, Chromeo sent out notice that they had recorded the "world's smallest album", entitled Drive Time, which consists of 55 songs in only 183 seconds. About a week later, it was revealed that Drive Time is actually a free musical Nokia Own Voice satellite navigation pack for Ovi Maps, made for usage with Nokia's compatible cell phones. A red vinyl 5" single consisting of regular, instrumental and a cappella versions of "Turn Left" and "Follow" was released to promote it, with a sticker on the shrink wrap saying that it was a numbered limited edition of 40 copies.

In September 2013, the group announced their fourth studio album White Women with a trailer video featuring the track "Over Your Shoulder". It was released 9 May 2014, in Ireland and 12 May elsewhere.

Chromeo performed at the Coachella Valley Music and Arts Festival in April 2014.

On 2 November 2017, Chromeo announced a new album called Head Over Heels. The first single "Juice" was released on 7 November 2017. In December 2018, Chromeo received their first Grammy nomination for Best Engineered Album, Non-Classical in the 61st Grammy Awards for the album.

On 4 May 2020, Chromeo announced the launch of its own record label, "Juliet Records" via Facebook.

On 12 June 2020, the band released "Quarantine Casanova," an EP of five new tracks written and recorded under lockdown during the Covid-19 pandemic. 100% of the proceeds from digital downloads, physical sales, and merch will be donated to Colin Kaepernick’s Know Your Rights Camp COVID-19 Relief Fund.

On 12 June 2021, the live album Date Night: Chromeo Live! was announced for release on 25 June, alongside the release of the single "Don’t Sleep (Live in Washington D.C.)". Tracks were recorded during a 2019 North America concert tour, where Chromeo performed live with a full band for the first time.

Chromeo performed at the 22nd Coachella Valley Music and Arts Festival in April 2023.

== Members ==
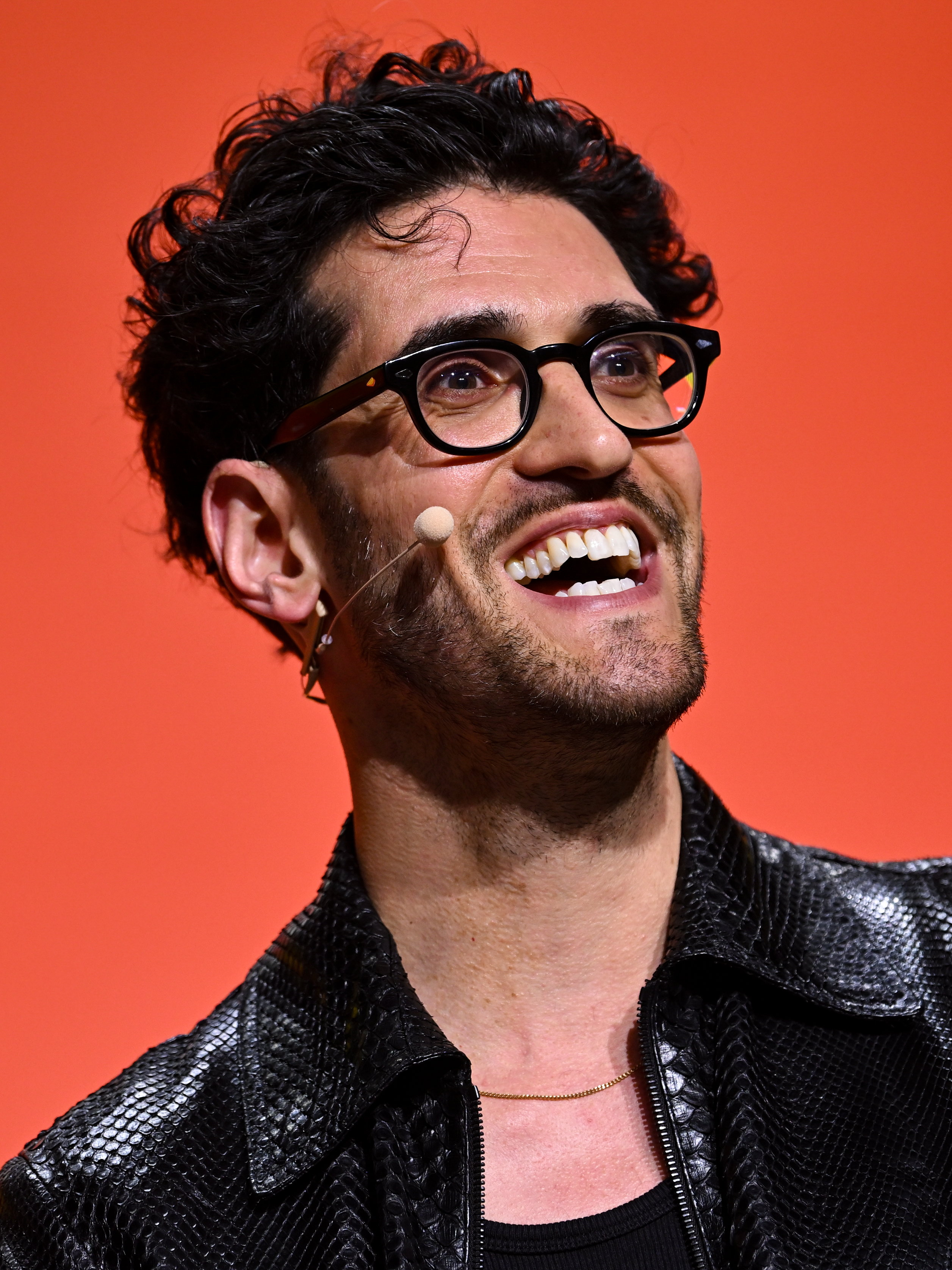
David "Dave 1" Macklovitch in June 2024

- Dave 1 (real name David Macklovitch, born 7 June 1978) on guitar and lead vocals. Macklovitch was a Ph.D. candidate in French literature at Columbia University in New York and taught French at Barnard College, but suspended his studies due to the success of the band.
- P-Thugg (real name Patrick Gemayel, Arabic: باتريك جميل, born in Lebanon on 31 July 1977) on keyboards, synthesizers, bass guitar, and talk box. He moved to Canada at the age of ten.

== Discography ==
- She's in Control (2004)
- Fancy Footwork (2007)
- Business Casual (2010)
- White Women (2014)
- Head over Heels (2018)
- Adult Contemporary (2024)

== Awards and nominations ==
Year	Award	Category	Work	Result
2007	Bucky Award	Best Sweatin' to the Indies Workout Song	"Fancy Footwork"	Won
2008	Woodie Award	Left Field Woodie	—N/a	Won
2008	Juno Award	Dance Recording of the Year	Fancy Footwork	Nominated
2011	Juno Award	Dance Recording of the Year	Business Casual	Nominated
2011	MTV Video Music Award	Best Special Effects	"Don't Turn the Lights On"	Nominated
2019	Grammy Awards	Best Engineered Album, Non-Classical	Head Over Heels	Nominated
2022	Juno Awards	Producer of the Year	On My Mind" (Anomalie & Chromeo), "Tango" (Onyx Collective)	Nominated

In 2025, a new genus of Early Cretaceous-aged fossil bird, Chromeornis funkyi, was named in honor of the band.
