= Three stripes =

Adidas' trademark

- One of the typical Adidas logo with the three stripes, introduced in 1991; this one for its Performance and Sportswear brandline, the textless version being used as the brand's main logo since 2022.

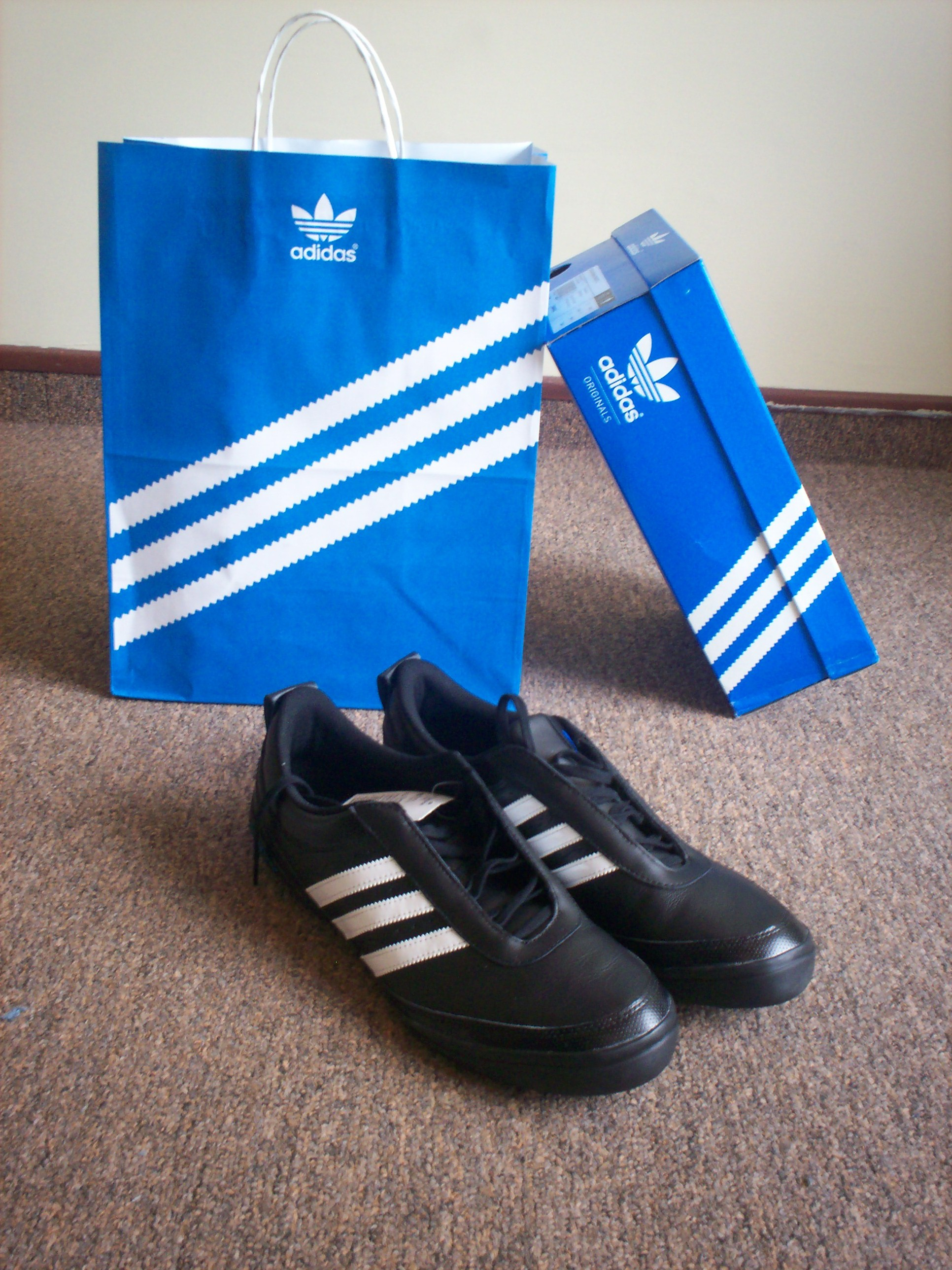
- Three stripes design application on shoes and packaging.
- Product type: Corporate identity
- Current owner: Adidas
- Country: Germany
- Introduced: 1949; 77 years ago
- Markets: Worldwide

Three stripes is a trademark of Adidas consisting of three parallel lines, which typically feature along the side of Adidas apparel. Adidas was known for this branding early in its history, with its owner, Adolf Dassler, describing it as "The three stripe company".

== History ==
Finnish Sport Museum has a pair of footwear from the 1940s with the three stripes by Finnish athletic footwear brand Karhu Sports. According to another source, the three stripes mark was created by the Adidas company founder, Adolf Dassler, and first used on footwear in 1949, when Adidas was founded. In 1952, following the 1952 Summer Olympics in Finland, Adidas acquired its signature three stripe branding from Karhu Sports, for two bottles of whiskey and the equivalent of €1,600.

The Trefoil logo of Adidas, used as the main logo from 1972 through 1997 and currently used for the Adidas Originals brandline.

The Trefoil logo was designed in 1971 and launched in 1972 with the Adidas SL 72, just in time for the 1972 Summer Olympics held in Munich. This logo lasted until 1997, when the company introduced the "three bars" logo (that had been designed by then Creative Director Peter Moore), initially used on the Equipment range of products. Designs for shoes registered in 1949 incorporated the three stripes along the side.

== Branding in sports ==
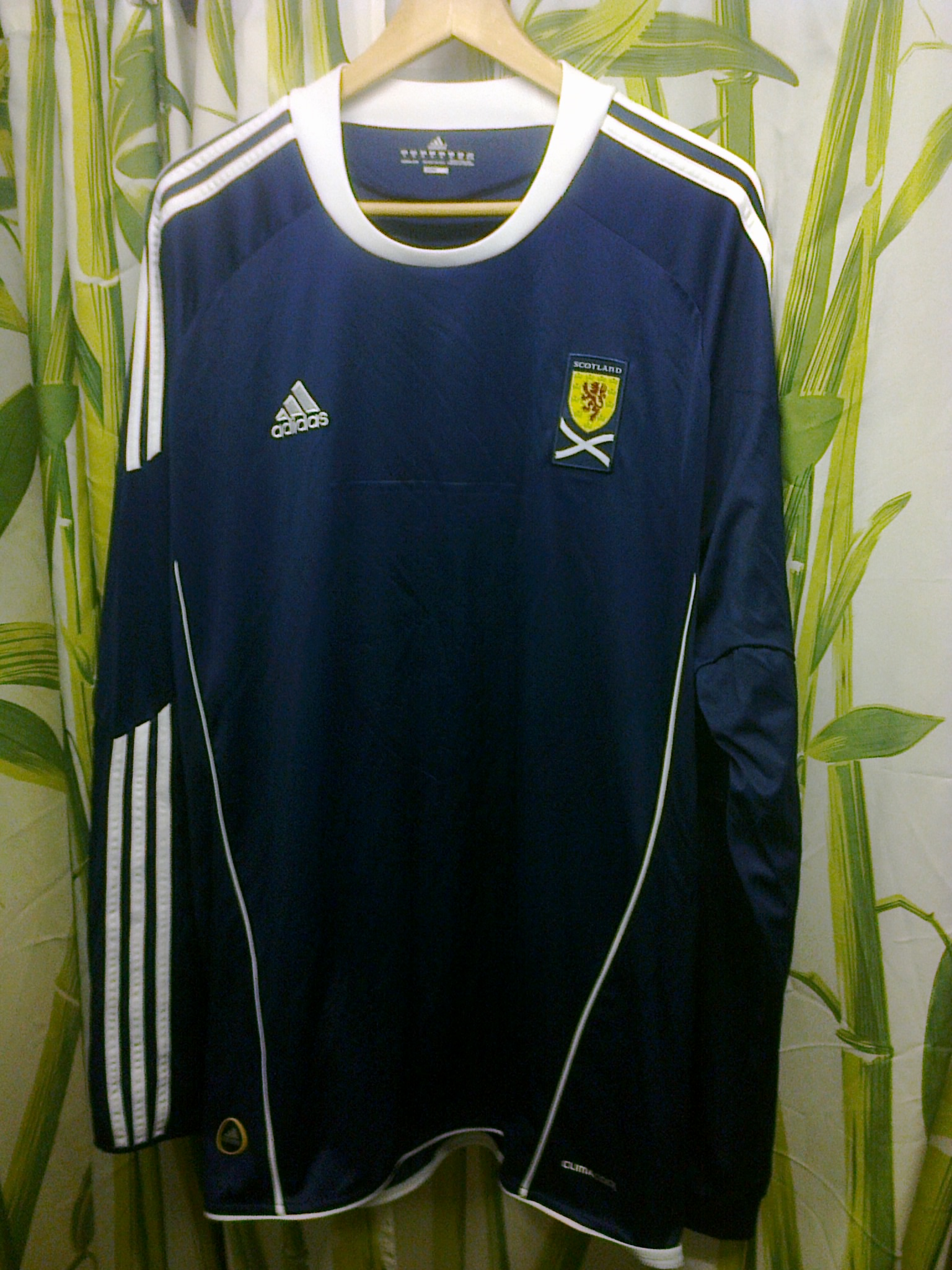
Scotland national football team jersey made by Adidas, with the classic three stripes. The break on the sleeves is mandated by the sport's governing bodies.

In 1998, Adidas sued the National Collegiate Athletic Association over their rules limiting the size and number of commercial logos on team uniforms and apparel. Adidas withdrew the suit, and the two groups established guidelines as to what three-stripe designs would be considered uses of the Adidas trademark.

In late 2004, rival sporting good manufacturers filed a complaint to the International Olympic Committee (IOC) over Adidas being allowed to exceed the 20 cm^{2} limit permitted for branding with the three stripes. Adidas argued that the trademark device was a design element rather than a logo and despite being an IOC sponsor, which led to accusations of Adidas receiving preferential treatment, the three stripes were banned by the Olympic movement starting with the 2006 Winter Games. However, Adidas circumvented the ban by using a modified three stripe design, combining them with the number 3, for the 2006 Games.

In 2006, Adidas sued All England Lawn Tennis and Croquet Club (Wimbledon), other Grand Slam tournaments and the International Tennis Federation over restrictions on manufacturer's identifications placed on player clothing.

Prior to UEFA Euro 2008, the Union of European Football Associations updated its kit regulations to mandate a 'sleeve free zone' on shirts worn under their auspices, to make room for competition markings. This affected Adidas by prohibiting the use of continual stripes down the sleeves. The world footballing governing body, the Fédération Internationale de Football Association (FIFA), implemented similar legislation in time for the 2010 FIFA World Cup.

== In popular culture ==
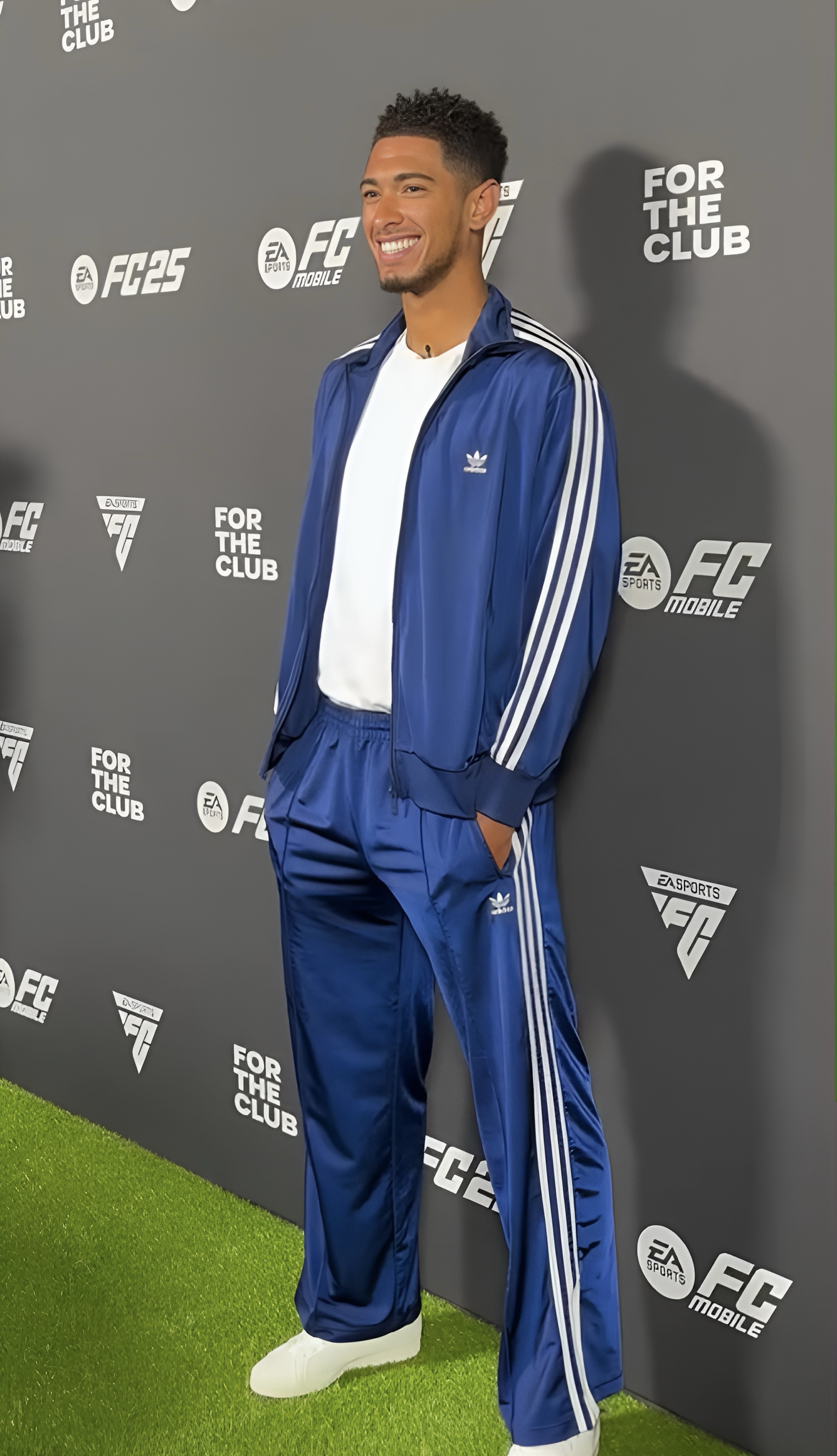
English footballer Jude Bellingham wearing a blue Adidas tracksuit with the three stripes at an EA Sports event in 2024.

The musical artist Lady Sovereign references the Three Stripes trademark in her song "Hoodie" from the album Public Warning. The album was released in 2006 and had multiple remixes, again involving references to the Three Stripes trademark.

Since the 1980 Summer Olympics in Moscow, Adidas or "the three-striped brand" has been the trademark of the Russian 'gopniks' (a stereotypical gang member of the low-class villages of Russia, addicted to vodka and hardbass songs) and therefore being a major subject for hardbass.

== Trademark disputes ==
Adidas has sued or threatened to sue retailers to protect the brand, including the following cases:

- 1983: Adidas v Charles O'Neill and Co Ltd 1983 ILRM 112
- 1995: settled a dispute with Walmart
- 2000: Marca Mode v Adidas decided at the European Court of Justice (Case C-425/98)
- 2002: settled with Walmart
- 2003: filed a lawsuit in a British court challenging Fitness World Trading's use of a two-stripe motif similar to Adidas' three stripes
- 2004 (August): Polo Ralph Lauren
- 2005: Abercrombie & Fitch, in Portland
- 2005 (March): Dutch Court of Appeal decided that Adidas had not sufficiently demonstrated that the Marca two-stripe design did not infringe, based on the Benelux Trademarks Act. (see Benelux Office for Intellectual Property)
- 2007 (February): Dutch Supreme Court ruled in the case Adidas/Marca Mode II that the two stripe of Marca et al. did not infringe the three stripe trade mark of Adidas.
- 2008 (April): European Court of Justice decided in favour of Adidas, against Marca Mode, C&A, H&M Hennes & Mauritz and Vendex KBB, that two-stripes could infringe on the Adidas three-stripe trademark.
- 2008 (May): Kmart
- 2008: Payless ShoeSource, ordered to pay $304.6 million; later reduced to $64.4 million. No. 01-CV-01655-RE.
- 2008 (October): Wal-Mart Stores Inc., third confidential settlement
- 2009: Aldo Group Inc., filed 14 January in federal court in Portland, claiming a breach of out-of-court settlements between the companies in 2004 and 2006. Adidas America Inc. v. Aldo Group Inc., 3:09- cv-00056
- 2014: Adidas successfully registers the three-stripe design at the European Union level.
- 2016: The EU's Intellectual Property Office (EUIPO) annuls the 2014 registration on the grounds that it was not distinctive enough.
- 2019: EU General Court upholds the 2016 decision of the EUIPO stating that it did not have enough "distinctive character" to qualify for the trademark.

Adidas has also settled with Steven Madden Ltd., Target Corp. and Nordstrom Inc. before going to trial.
