= Blah Blah (EP) =

Blah Blah EP

EP by Lady Sovereign
- Released: April 17, 2006
- Genre: Hip hop; grime; UK garage
- Length: 15:06
- Label: Def Jam; Chocolate
- Producer: Felix Buxton

Lady Sovereign chronology
Vertically Challenged (2005)	Blah Blah EP (2006)	Public Warning (2006)

Blah Blah EP is the second EP from UK hip hop artist Lady Sovereign. It was only released in the UK.

The lead track from the EP was "Blah Blah". The song had a music video, which was included on the DVD, however, unlike "Random" being the lead single from Vertically Challenged, "Blah Blah" was never released as a single in its own right. It was originally due to be the follow-up to "Random" but "9 to 5" was chosen instead.

The EP also came with a bonus DVD and is individually numbered authenticating its limited printing.

== Production ==
The bassline of the title track is sampled from Damian Marley's "All Night."

== Critical reception ==
The Boston Globe praised the title track, calling it an "elastic, rapid-fire rhyme showcase."

== Track listing ==
CD

1. "Blah Blah" - 3:58
2. "A Little Bit of Shhh" (Smallstars Remix by Ad-Rock) - 3:34
3. "Public Warning" (Live at The Roadhouse, Manchester) - 4:49
4. "Drunk on Radiation" (Freestyle) 2:49

DVD

1. "Blah Blah" (The Video)
2. Making of the Video
3. Talking Some Blah Blah! (Fans Interview)
