= Those Were the Days (Lady Sovereign song) =

Single by Lady Sovereign

from the album Public Warning
- Released: 16 April 2007
- Recorded: 2006
- Genre: Pop rap; hip hop
- Length: 3:49
- Label: Island Records; Def Jam
- Songwriter(s): Louise Harman; Lukasz Gottwald
- Producer(s): Dr. Luke

Lady Sovereign singles chronology
"Love Me or Hate Me" (2006)	"Those Were the Days" (2007)	"I Got You Dancing" (2008)

"Those Were the Days" (produced by Lukasz "Dr. Luke" Gottwald) is the seventh single from UK hip-hop artist Lady Sovereign, and the fifth from her debut album, Public Warning. The single was confirmed for release on her official website and was released to UK download services on 9 April, followed by the physical release on 16 April. The music video for "Those Were the Days" has also been released to various websites on 9 April. The song features Ya Kid K on backup vocals.

== Track listing ==
UK CD single

1. "Those Were the Days" - 3:49
2. "Random" (Live) - 4:05
3. "Love Me or Hate Me" (Live) - 4:00
4. "Those Were the Days" (Sinden Remix) - 3:44

== Chart ==
Chart (2007)	Peak position
UK Singles Chart	101
