= Hoodie (Lady Sovereign song) =

2005 single by Lady Sovereign

Single by Lady Sovereign

from the album Public Warning
- Released: 21 November 2005
- Recorded: 2005
- Genre: Pop-rap; hip hop; grime
- Length: 3:23
- Label: Island Records, Def Jam
- Songwriters: Louise Harman & Gabriel Olegavich
- Producer: Medasyn

Lady Sovereign singles chronology
"9 to 5" (2005)	"Hoodie" (2005)	"Nine2Five" (2006)

"Hoodie" is the fourth single from hip hop artist Lady Sovereign's debut album Public Warning, following the release of her first UK top 40 hit, "9 to 5". The single was produced by UK dance outfit Basement Jaxx and became her third top 75 hit, peaking at #44 in the UK Singles Chart. The single's B-side was her debut 12" single "Ch Ching (Cheque 1 2)".

The single was recorded to coincide with her "Save the Hoodie" campaign. Lady Sovereign wrote the single as she was angry that individuals wearing hoodies were being persecuted against due to people stating that they created social fear. Lady Sovereign stated at the time, "I'm all about standing up for the hoodie. They wanna have a moan about people that wear them, but I wear them all the time and I don't like the way some other people dress".

Lady Sovereign references the Three stripes trademark of Adidas in the song.

The song was accompanied by a music video, which was directed by Nima Nourizadeh.

== Track listing ==
CD single 1

1. "Hoodie" (Radio Mix) - 3:23
2. "Ch Ching (Cheque 1 2)" - 4:40

CD single 2

1. "Hoodie" (Radio Mix) - 3:23
2. "Hoodie" (Alternative Medasyn Mix) - 3:37
3. "Hoodie" (Brucker & Sinden Remix featuring Tinchy Stryder) - 4:04
4. "Hoodie" (Mizz Beats Remix featuring Skepta, JME, Jammer, Ears & Baby Blue) - 4:08
5. "Hoodie" (Video)

12" single

- A1 "Hoodie" (Basement Jaxx Remix)
- A2 "Hoodie" (Brucker & Sinden Remix featuring Tinchy Stryder)
- A3 "Hoodie" (Mizz Beats Remix featuring Skepta, JME, Jammer, Ears & Baby Blue)
- B2 "Ch Ching (Cheque 1 2)"
