= Vertically challenged =

Vertically challenged may refer to:

- Vertically challenged, a euphemism for short stature.
- Vertically Challenged (EP), a 2005 record by Lady Sovereign.
