= Public Warning =

2006 album by Lady Sovereign

Studio album by Lady Sovereign
- Released: 31 October 2006
- Recorded: 2004–2006
- Genre: Grime; hip hop; electronica
- Length: 44:27
- Label: Def Jam; Island; Island Def Jam
- Producer: Basement Jaxx; Dr. Luke; Medasyn

Lady Sovereign chronology
Blah Blah (2006)	Public Warning (2006)	Jigsaw (2009)

Singles from Public Warning
- 1. "Random" Released: 14 March 2005; 2. "9 to 5" Released: 8 August 2005; 3. "Hoodie" Released: 21 November 2005; 4. "Love Me or Hate Me" Released: 30 October 2006; 5. "Those Were the Days" Released: 9 April 2007

Public Warning is the first studio album by English hip hop artist Lady Sovereign, released on 31 October 2006. Was originally due for release in November 2005 but was pushed back after Lady Sovereign was signed by Island Def Jam.

In a July 2006 press release, the album's track listing was confirmed. Public Warning features Lady Sovereign's three past singles, tracks from her two EPs: Vertically Challenged and Blah Blah, as well as newly recorded tracks for the release, including "Love Me or Hate Me" and "Those Were the Days". The album was released in the U.K. on 5 February 2007, with a live cover of the Sex Pistols' "Pretty Vacant" as a bonus track.

Public Warning received generally positive reviews from critics, who praised the production and lyrical content for carrying both humor and substance. The album sold over 125,000 copies in the United States and sold 250,000 copies worldwide.

== Critical reception ==
Professional ratings
Aggregate scores
Source	Rating
Metacritic	67/100
Review scores
Source	Rating
AllMusic	4/5 stars
The A.V. Club	B+
Drowned in Sound	8/10
Entertainment Weekly	B
The Guardian	2/5 stars
Pitchfork	6.4/10
PopMatters	7/10 stars
Rolling Stone	3.5/5 stars
Slant Magazine	3.5/5 stars
Stylus Magazine	D+

Public Warning received generally positive reviews from music critics. At Metacritic, which assigns a normalised rating out of 100 to reviews from mainstream critics, the album has received an average score of 67, based on 34 reviews.

AllMusic editor David Jeffries praised the album for Medasyn's production and Sovereign's lyrical content for being relatable, calling it "an exciting introduction to an extraordinary artist captured at just the right time." Michaelangelo Matos of The A.V. Club compared the album to The Sex Pistols, praising tracks like "Tango" and "Hoodie" for their angst-filled energy, saying "Even if Sov doesn't cross over the way she or Def Jam might want her to, she still sounds like an original—even for people who know half the songs already." Mike Diver of Drowned in Sound praised the album for having solid production and lyrical content that's both gritty and humorous, saying "When her tongue's in cheek and her rhymes amuse, Lady Sovereign is hugely entertaining."

Michael Endelman of Entertainment Weekly found criticism in the album's overly frenetic beats and out-of-tune choruses but praised Sovereign for her humor and lyrical flow, saying that her "rubbery rhymes and punky energy are definitely entertaining, and well worth sampling in moderate doses." Steve 'Flash' Juon of RapReviews commented that Sovereign's heavily accented lyrics and electronic beats can get abrasive at times but said the album has crossover potential because of her flow and humor that requires little British familiarity.

The album also received negative reception from critics. Alex Macpherson of The Guardian commented on Sovereign's talent being wasted on hollow content and production that moved towards ska-punk than grime, calling it "the sound of a fantastic artist seemingly intent on compromising all her strengths." Baz Dreisinger of The Village Voice compared Sovereign to Eminem, commenting on the catchy choruses, juvenile humor and one-liners throughout the album but felt that it lacked character and substance to match the comparison. The most critical of the album was Al Shipley of Stylus Magazine, who heavily criticized the botched humor, synthpop production and Sovereign's lyrical flow, saying that she "simulates the altogether new and horrible experience of hearing Eliza Doolittle rap."

Rolling Stone ranked the album number 48 on its list of Best Albums of 2006.

== Censored version ==
A censored version was also released that used backmasking and sound effects over the profanities. The album booklet still has all the lyrics written out, but the profanities are starred over.

== Track listing ==
Public Warning track listing
No.	Title	Writer(s)	Producer(s)	Length
1.	"9 to 5"	Louise Harman; Gabriel Olegavich	Medasyn	3:32
2.	"Gatheration"	Harman; Olegavich; Danny Harrison; Arthur Smith	Menta	3:23
3.	"Random"	Harman; Olegavich; Harrison; Smith	Menta	3:36
4.	"Public Warning"	Harman; Olegavich	Medasyn	3:46
5.	"Love Me or Hate Me"	Harman; Lukasz Gottwald	Dr. Luke	3:29
6.	"My England"	Harman; Olegavich	Medasyn	3:57
7.	"Tango"	Harman; Olegavich	Medasyn	3:37
8.	"A Little Bit of Shhh"	Harman; Olegavich	Medasyn	3:45
9.	"Hoodie"	Harman; Olegavich	Medasyn	3:37
10.	"Those Were the Days"	Harman; Gottwald	Dr Luke	3:50
11.	"Blah Blah"	Harman; Olegavich	Basement Jaxx	3:57
12.	"Fiddle with the Volume"	Harman; Olegavich	Medasyn	3:37
13.	"Love Me or Hate Me" (Remix featuring Missy Elliott)	Harman; Gottwald; Missy Elliott	Dr Luke	3:38

UK special edition bonus track
No.	Title	Length
14.	"Pretty Vacant" (Live at Commodore Ballroom)	3:38

Japan bonus tracks
No.	Title	Length
14.	"Ch Ching (Cheque 1 2)"	4:47
15.	"Pretty Vacant" (Live at Commodore Ballroom)	3:38

iTunes bonus tracks
No.	Title	Length
14.	"Pretty Vacant" (live at Commodore Ballroom)	3:38
15.	"The Broom"	4:02
16.	"Hoodie" (Mizz Beats Remix; featuring Skepta, JME, Jammer, Ears & Baby Blue)	4:07
17.	"9 to 5" (The Ordinary Boys Remix)	3:25

- The enhanced CD contains a link to a 15-minute documentary

== Charts ==
Chart performance for Public Warning
Chart (2006)	Peak position
Australian Albums Chart	97
UK Albums (OCC)	58
US Billboard 200	48
US Top Rap Albums (Billboard)	12

== Release history ==
Release history and formats for Public Warning
Region	Date	Format	Label
United States	31 October 2006	Digital download, CD	Def Jam
United States	12 December 2006	Vinyl	Def Jam
United Kingdom	5 February 2007	Digital download, CD	Def Jam
Germany	30 March 2007	Digital download, CD	Def Jam
