= Bad Ass Strippa =

Single by Jentina

from the album Jentina
- Released: June 21, 2004
- Recorded: 2004
- Genre: Hip hop; R&B
- Length: 2:49
- Label: Virgin
- Songwriters: Jentina Chapman; David Dorrell; Matt Rowe; Kenneth Gamble; Leon Huff; Anthony Jackson
- Producers: David Dorrell; Matt Rowe

Jentina singles chronology
"Bad Ass Strippa" (2004)	"French Kisses" (2004)

"Bad Ass Strippa" is the debut single by English rapper and singer Jentina from her eponymous debut album, Jentina (2005). It was released in Ireland, Italy, and the United Kingdom on July 16, 2004. It achieved average success in Italy and the UK, despite a heavy advertising campaign including adverts on primetime television in the latter. The single features many remixes, including an instrumental version of the song.

A music video was made, featuring Jentina in the streets, walking and dancing in a provocative fashion.

The track was later parodied by British hip hop/grime MC Lady Sovereign with its name changed to "Sad Ass Stripah". In 2010, "Bad Ass Strippa" was featured in the BBC Three make-under program Snog Marry Avoid?.

== Track listing ==
=== CD 1 ===
1. "Bad Ass Strippa"
2. "Bad Ass Strippa" (Dave Kelly Remix)
3. "Bad Ass Strippa" (Radio Slave Remix)
4. "Bad Ass Strippa" (extended mix)
5. "Bad Ass Strippa" (instrumental)
6. "Bad Ass Strippa" (CD-ROM video)

=== CD 2 ===
1. "Bad Ass Strippa"
2. "Bad Ass Strippa" (instrumental)

=== 12" ===
==== Side 1 ====
1. "Bad Ass Strippa"
2. "Bad Ass Strippa" (Dave Kelly Remix)

==== Side 2 ====
1. "Bad Ass Strippa" (Radio Slave Remix)

== Chart performance ==
Chart (2004)	Peak position
Australia (ARIA)	49
Australian Urban (ARIA)	17
Italy (FIMI)	20
UK Singles (OCC)	22
