= French Kisses =

Single by Jentina

from the album Jentina
- Released: 27 September 2004
- Recorded: 2004
- Genre: Hip hop; electro-R&B
- Length: 2:57
- Label: Virgin Records
- Songwriters: Jentina Chapman; Cathy Dennis; Greg Wells
- Producers: Cathy Dennis; Greg Wells

Jentina singles chronology
| "Bad Ass Strippa" (2004) | "French Kisses" (2004) | "Mysterious" (2005) |

"French Kisses" is a song by English singer Jentina. It was released as the second single from her eponymous debut album Jentina (2005) and was only released in the UK and Ireland. It was written by Jentina, Cathy Dennis and Greg Wells.

A music video was made for this song, where Jentina is in a club trying to kiss a boy during the whole video, but something always occurs and they do not end up kissing. The video was directed by Dawn Shadforth.

== Track listings ==
CD 1

1. "French Kisses"
2. "French Kisses" (E-Smoove Radio Edit)

CD 2

1. "French Kisses"
2. "French Kisses" (Switch's Jack the Box Remix)
3. "French Kisses" (Search & Destroy Remix)

12"

- Side 1
1. "French Kisses"
2. "French Kisses" (E-Smoove Remix)
- Side 2
1. "French Kisses" (Switch's Jack the Box Remix) {Side 2}

== Chart performance ==
| Chart (2004) | Peak position |
|---|---|
| UK Singles Chart | 20 |
