= Mysterious (song) =

Single by Jentina

from the album Jentina
- Released: 2005
- Recorded: 2005
- Genre: Hip hop; electronic
- Length: 3:17
- Label: Virgin
- Songwriter(s): Jentina Chapman; Matt Rowe; David Dorrell
- Producer(s): David Dorrell; Matt Rowe

Jentina singles chronology
"French Kisses" (2004)	"Mysterious" (2005)

"Mysterious" is a song by English rapper Jentina. It was released as the third and final single from her eponymous debut album Jentina (2005). It was released only in Italy. Plans were made for a UK release but were cancelled.

A music video, directed by Ben Ib was made for this single with a futuristic theme. The video was mostly computerised with Jentina singing in many different locations and appearing in many different magazines.

== Track listing ==
1. "Mysterious"
2. "Mysterious" (The Vanden Plas Remix)
3. "Mysterious" (James Ford Remix)
4. "Mysterious" (Return to the Stone Age Mix)

== Chart performance ==
Chart (2005)	Peak position
Italy (FIMI)	30
