= Love Me or Hate Me =

Single by Lady Sovereign

from the album Public Warning
- Released: 30 October 2006
- Recorded: 2006
- Genre: Alternative hip hop; comedy hip hop; grime
- Length: 3:29
- Label: Island; Def Jam
- Songwriters: Louise Harman; Lukasz Gottwald
- Producer: Dr. Luke

Lady Sovereign singles chronology
"Nine2Five" (2006)	"Love Me or Hate Me" (2006)	"Those Were the Days" (2007)

Missy Elliott singles chronology
"Touch It" (remix) (2006)	"Love Me or Hate Me" (remix) (2006)	"Let It Go" (2007)

"Love Me or Hate Me" is the sixth single from English grime artist Lady Sovereign and the fourth from her debut album Public Warning. The single was confirmed for release by her official website and was released in October 2006. The song was produced by Lukasz "Dr. Luke" Gottwald. The video features Lady Sovereign appearing in Tetris-style blocks, and acting out certain lyrics of the song.

The song became the first song by a British rap artist to ever reach number one on MTV's TRL, as well as being heard in a TV spot for Verizon Wireless for the LG Chocolate. In addition, it peaked at number 45 on the Billboard Hot 100 chart, making it Lady Sovereign's first single to chart in the US. In 2007, the song debuted at number 48 on the UK Singles Chart, later peaking at number 26, becoming her highest charting solo hit to date within the UK. Blender ranked it as the 32nd best song of 2006. A remix is available featuring Missy Elliott.

The song has sold over 750,000 copies in the US. The song has been featured as the theme song for Season 1 of the Oxygen reality show Bad Girls Club as well as their spinoff Bad Girls Road Trip. It can also be heard in the video game Need for Speed: Carbon, and in an episode of the ABC TV series Ugly Betty. It was also featured on the season four episode "The Metamorphosis" of the teen drama series The O.C.

== Commercial performance ==
"Love Me or Hate Me" debuted on the Billboard Hot 100 the week of 28 October 2006 at number 81. Three weeks later, it peaked at number 45 the week of 18 November, staying on the chart for nine weeks.

The track also reached number one during a 15-week run on the Billboard Club Play chart on 7 April 2007 on the strength of the Jason Nevins mixes.

== Music video ==
Parts of the music video have a Tetris theme.

Directed by Brian Beltric (who previously directed videos for the Black Eyed Peas), the video features Lady Sovereign in London acting out certain parts of the song's lyrics. Intercut are scenes of Lady Sovereign appearing and disappearing in Tetris-style blocks.

== Formats and track listing ==
UK CD single

- 1. "Love Me or Hate Me" (album version) – 3:29
- 2. "Love Me or Hate Me" (Remix featuring Missy Elliott) – 3:40
- 3. "Love Me or Hate Me" (Jason Nevins Remix) – 3:29

UK 12" single

- A1. "Love Me or Hate Me" (Original) – 3:29
- A2. "Love Me or Hate Me" (Remix featuring Missy Elliott) – 3:40
- B1. "Love Me or Hate Me" (Jason Nevins Remix) – 3:29
- B2. "Love Me or Hate Me" (Instrumental) – 3:30

US CD single

- 1. "Love Me or Hate Me (F**k You!!!!)" (Clean) – 3:32
- 2. "Love Me or Hate Me (F**k You!!!!)" (Main) – 3:32
- 3. "Love Me or Hate Me (F**k You!!!!)" (Instrumental) – 3:33
- 4. "Love Me or Hate Me (F**k You!!!!)" (A Cappella) – 3:29

Germany CD single

- 1. "Love Me or Hate Me (Fuck You!!!)" (Clean) – 3:30
- 2. "Love Me or Hate Me (Fuck You!!!)" (Remix featuring Missy Elliott) – 3:40
- 3. "Love Me or Hate Me" (video) – 2:47

== Charts ==
=== Weekly charts ===
Chart (2006–2007)	Peak position
Australia (ARIA)	48
Czech Republic Airplay (ČNS IFPI)	50
Denmark (Tracklisten)	24
Finland (Suomen virallinen lista)	10
Germany (GfK)	65
Slovakia Airplay (ČNS IFPI)	88
UK Singles (Official Charts)	26
US Billboard Hot 100	45
US Dance Club Songs (Billboard)	1

=== Year-end charts ===
Chart (2007)	Position
US Dance Club Songs (Billboard)	33

== Release history ==
Release dates and formats for "Love Me or Hate Me"
Region	Date	Format	Label(s)	Ref.
United States	19 September 2006	Mainstream airplay	Def Con II	

== See also ==
- List of number-one dance singles of 2007 (U.S.)
