= So Human =

2009 single by Lady Sovereign

Single by Lady Sovereign

from the album Jigsaw
- Released: 6 April 2009
- Recorded: 2008
- Genre: Pop rap; hip hop; grime
- Length: 3:56
- Label: Midget
- Songwriter(s): Louise Harman; Lukasz Gottwald; Benjamin Levin; Gabriel Olegavich; Robert Smith
- Producer(s): Medasyn

Lady Sovereign singles chronology
"I Got You Dancing" (2008)	"So Human" (2009)

"So Human" is a song by British rapper Lady Sovereign. The song was the second single from her second album Jigsaw. The single was released on 6 April 2009 and reached 38 on the UK Singles Chart. The song was written by Louise Harman (a.k.a. Lady Sovereign), Gabriel Olegavich, Dr. Luke, Benny Blanco and Robert Smith. The song contains heavy sampling of the 1985 single "Close to Me" by English rock band the Cure, of whom Smith is the lead vocalist, as well as songwriter.

== Critical response ==
Digital Spy gave the song 4 out of 5 stars and a very positive review, stating "it's a perky urban pop tune about having bad days and not beating yourself up about it. Sovereign remains as straight-talking and listenable as ever - "I need a bag of green to make this go away," she raps at one point - making this a welcome reminder of her talents".

Orange UK gave the song 4 out of 5 stars and welcomed Lady Sovereign back onto the music scene, saying "'So Human' sees Sovereign applying her no-nonsense straight-talking wit to one of British pop's most prized possessions. The result is a perky, poppy urban track that just about sidesteps novelty territory and is all the better for it. Welcome home m'Lady".

BBC Radio 1's Chart Blog commented on both the video and the song:

The video goes perfectly with this song; it's sort of comfortingly cheap, with slightly-crap-but-carried-off-well "special effects" like the magazine covers and it fits the lyrics (which, admittedly, I didn't actually realise were about maintaining your human side whilst famous until I watched that so top marks for illustrative education there) and it's generally very good.

The song itself, again, is very good. The use of the sample from the theme from The Smoking Room 'Close To Me' by The Cure is well done; although 'Close To Me' is a desperately heartbreaking (and desperately desperate) song, its beat has always been wonderfully gentle and reassuring, bumbling along in an intimate, gentle way like an audiohug. Which is perfect for a song essentially all about having a really rubbish time of it and losing your temper and getting a bit "tired and emotional" and then having a big cry and feeling better.

Sov looks great in the video, she sounds great on the track, I really like both. It's all really good.

Maybe it's me being hard to please, though but a bit of me sinks when I see this; yes, it works really well and hopefully it'll be successful but as good as this all is, there's a lot of me that wishes Lady Sovereign wouldn't have to do something as, essentially, cheap as this to make it work; seeing artists constrained by budget is never particularly satisfying, even when it works out and I'd rather see personality pieces like 'I Got U Dancin' given the treatment they deserve than this being released because it's doable with the resources available, in the end.

BBC gave the song an overall 4 stars out of 5.

== Chart performance ==
The song debuted on the UK Singles Chart one week before the full release at 38, on the next week's chart it stayed at 38 making it two weeks in the top 40.

The song debuted at number 82 on the Australian ARIA Singles Chart after receiving a considerable amount of airplay. The song went on to peak at number 36. It spent a total of 4 weeks within the top 50, compared to "Love Me or Hate Me" which spent only one week within the top 50.

== Music video ==
The video starts off with Sovereign standing in front of a white wall with a splash of yellow paint on it. Then it goes to Sovereign on the red carpet being interviewed, after the paparazzi take many pictures of her a model walks on and tries to steal the spotlight so she trips her over. She then steals a camera of the paparazzi and throws it away from him. She then appears on two magazine covers one called "Crazed" and another called "Any Other Magazine". She then appears on a couch with a psychiatrist sitting next to her and she takes notes on everything Sovereign says. the psychiatrist eventually breaks down in tears and hugs Sovereign. She then appears on two new magazines one called "Vague" and the other called "Spender". She then talks to a guy who is viewing art at a gallery and then she walks off because he bores her. When she walks off she lets her friends sneak in and they have a party. She then ends it by going everywhere she has already been in the video and the person next to her mimes the words off the song.

== Track listings ==
UK single 1

1. "So Human" clean edit
2. "So Human" dirty album version

UK single 2

1. "So Human" album version
2. "I Got You Dancing" Semothy Jones Remix

== Charts ==
Chart (2009)	Peak position
Australia (ARIA)	36
Czech Republic (Rádio – Top 100)	6
Scotland (OCC)	16
UK Singles (OCC)	38
UK Hip Hop/R&B (OCC)	9

== Release history ==
Country	Release date	Format
United Kingdom	6 April 2009	CD single; digital download
