= Adidas SL 72 =

Line of shoes by Adidas

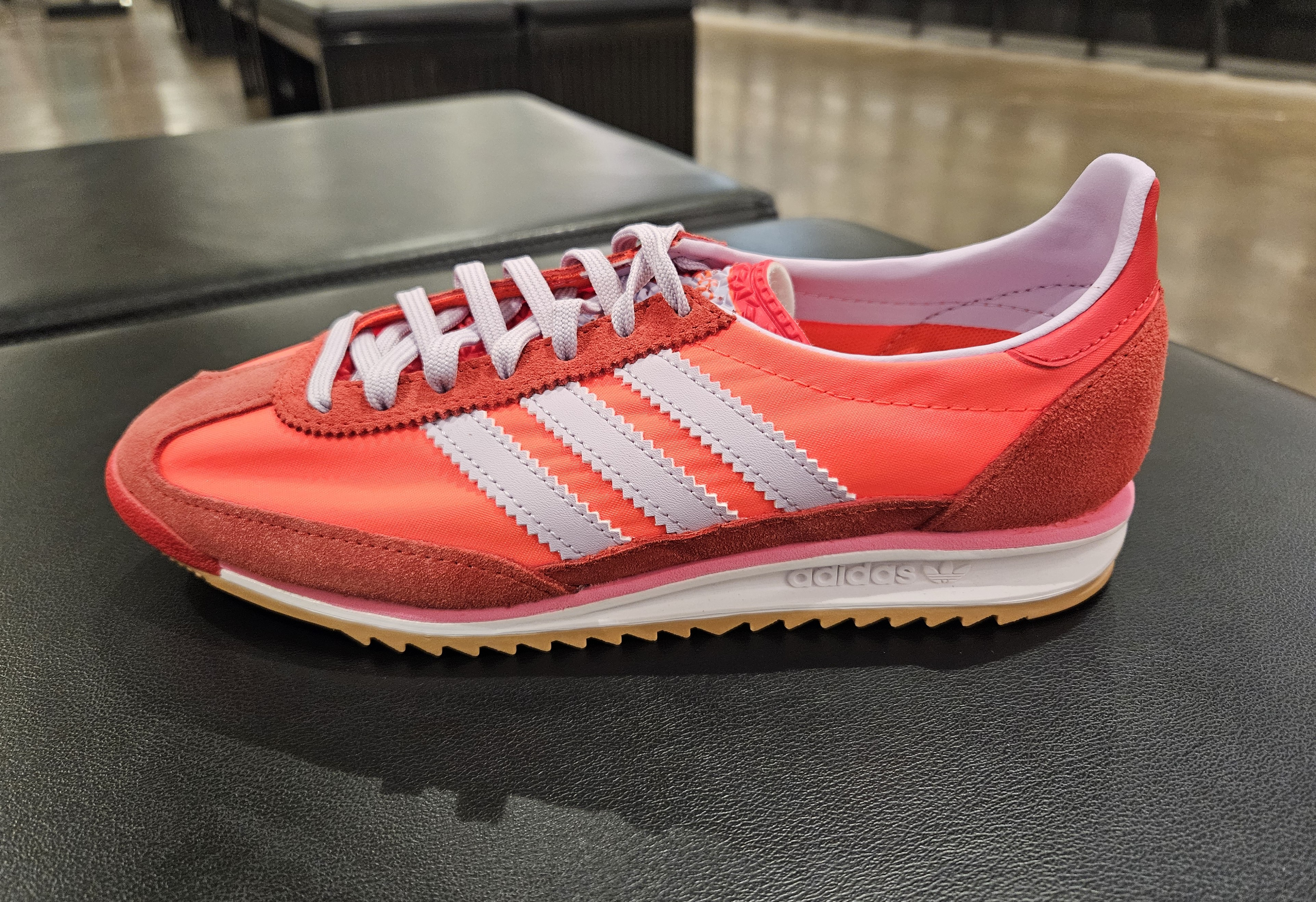
- Adidas SL 72 OG sneakers
- Type: Sneakers
- Inventor: Adidas
- Inception: 1972; 54 years ago
- Manufacturer: Adidas
- Available: Yes

Adidas SL 72 is a lightweight running shoe released by Adidas in 1972. It was the first shoe to feature the trefoil logo.

== Overview ==
Adidas released the SL 72 as a lightweight alternative to its other running shoes. The "SL" in the name stands for "Super Light" and the "72" for the year it was released in. The shoe was designed to appeal to a casual runner and capitalize on the running boom of the 1970s. The shoe is made up of a nylon upper to make it less heavy with suede overlays at the toe, heel, and eyelets of the shoe. The EVA midsole has a rubber toe protector to prevent abrasions as well. The shoe was released during the 1972 Summer Olympics.

== Models ==
=== SL 72 OG ===
The original version of the shoe in the same design.

=== SL 72 RS ===
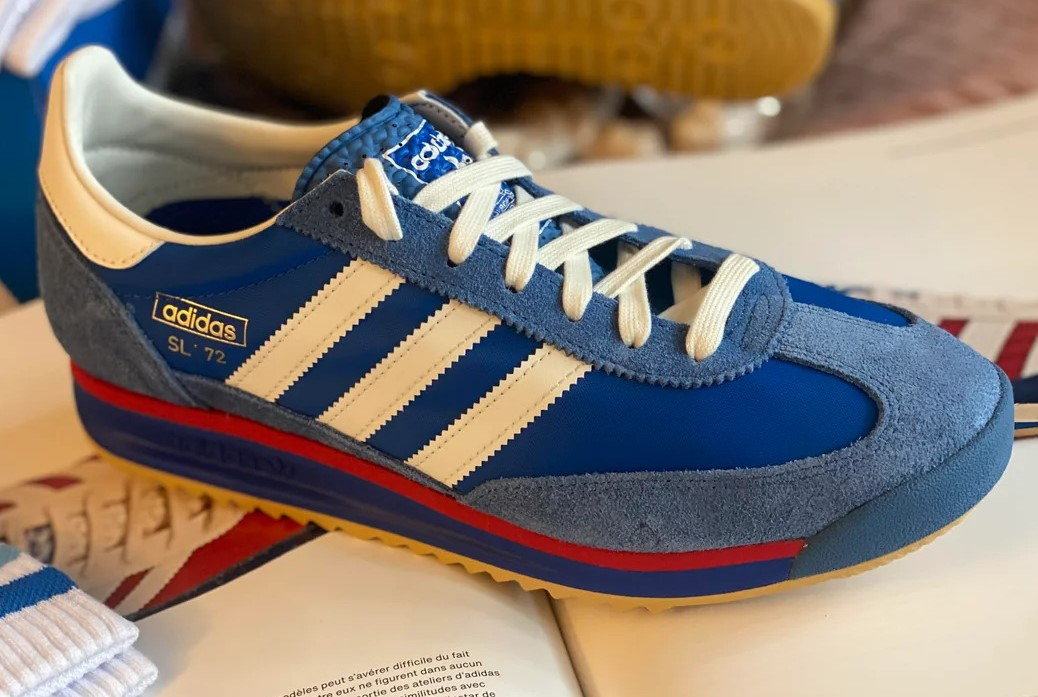
Adidas SL 72 RS in blue.

The SL 72 RS features the same design on the upper but has a slightly chunkier sole underneath. The "RS" in the name stands for "reshaped". It was released at the beginning of 2024

=== SL 72 RTN ===
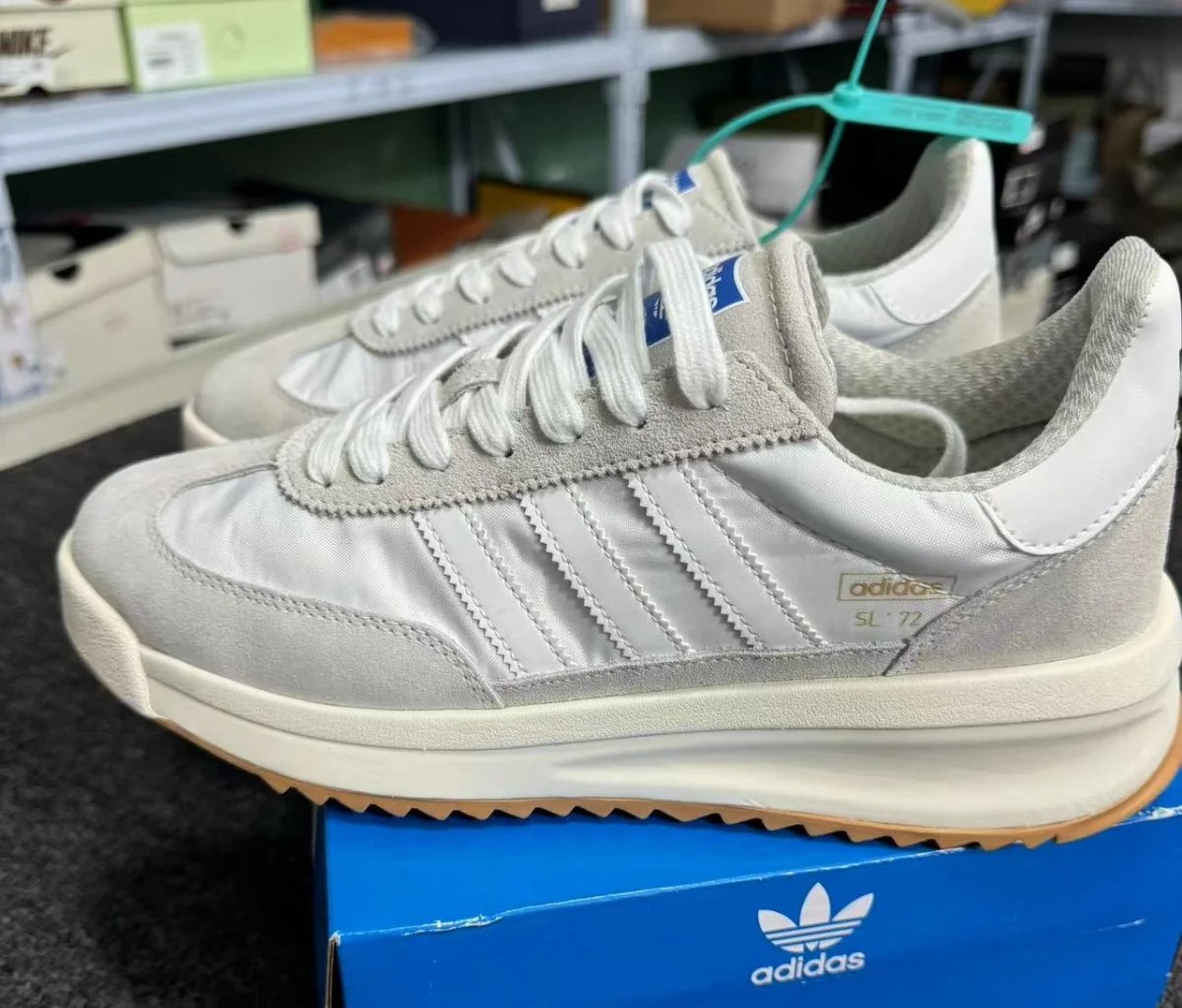
A grey pair of Adidas SL 72 RTN.

This model features a chunkier, rugged sole that is meant for outdoor use. It was released in the summer of 2024.

=== SL Loop Runner ===
A modern running shoe that takes design elements from the original "SL 72". It was released in 2014 and meant to be a modern interpretation of the original shoe.
