= Ben Ib =

Music video director

- Occupations: Music video director and CGI artist
- Known for: Kylie Minogue, Calvin Harris, The Ting Tings videos

Ben Ib is a computer graphics artist living and working in London. He has directed music videos for Kylie Minogue, Calvin Harris, The Ting Tings, Roni Size, Goldie Lookin Chain, Mr Hudson and Stateless. He has also created live tour visuals for Paul McCartney, Roger Waters, Robbie Williams, Minogue and The Smashing Pumpkins, as well as creating the cover image for AC/DC's Power Up album (Creative Direction by Josh Cheuse) and Paul McCartney's New album (from a logo and cover concept conceived by UK art and design team Rebecca and Mike).

== Early work ==
Ib studied art at Leeds University.

His first digital short film, Collapse, produced during his third year at the university, won the “Video Positive” award in 1996 and was featured in Channel Four’s "Digital Underground" series. His early student works were also presented at several international festivals, including the Hanover Film Festival, the AVE Festival in Arnhem (The Netherlands), One Dot Zero, Cinefeel, and the Edinburgh Film Festival.

In 1998, Ib moved to London to work as a 3D artist in the post-production industry, later transitioning into directing television advertisements and music videos.

== Music videos ==
- Calvin Harris – "Ready for the Weekend"
- The Ting Tings – "We Walk"
- Kylie Minogue – "The One"
- Mr Hudson – "Too Late Too Late"
- Jentina – "Mysterious"
- Goldie Lookin Chain – "Your Missus Is a Nutter"
- Roni Size ft Beverly Knight – "No More"
- Ali Love – "Secret Sunday Lover"
- Switches – "Lay Down the Law"
- Stateless – "Down Here"
- AC/DC – "Demon Fire"

== Concert visuals ==
- Tame Impala – Slow Rush Tour
- Kylie Minogue – Glastonbury Festival Legends Slot
- The Killers – Wonderful Wonderful Tour
- Paul McCartney – One on One Tour
- The Who – Glastonbury Festival
- The Killers – Glastonbury Festival
- Paul McCartney – Out There! Tour
- Paul McCartney – On the Run Tour
- Paul McCartney – The Liverpool Sound Concert
- Roger Waters – The Wall Live
- Kylie Minogue – Aphrodite Tour
- Kylie Minogue – X Tour
- Robbie Williams – Close Encounters Tour

== Other work ==
- AC/DC – Power Up album cover image (Creative Direction Josh Cheuse)
- The Neon Demon - Film title sequence (With All City Media)
- Paul McCartney – New album cover image (Logo and cover concept by Rebecca and Mike, Consultancy and design by YES)
- Paul McCartney – "Ramming" documentary, 2012 (Director)
- Razorlight – "Golden Touch – Live at the Bicklayers Arms" (Director)
- SJWatson – "Before I go to Sleep" commercial (Director)
- Directed television advertisements for Coke Light, Sunsilk and Dulux
