= Jentina =

UK-based recording artist and model (born 1984)

- Born: 6 March 1984 (age 42); Woking, England
- Origin: England
- Genres: Hip-hop; R&B
- Occupations: Rapper; singer; songwriter; model
- Years active: 2004–2011
- Label: Virgin

Jentina Rose Rees (née Chapman, born 6 March 1984) is an English rapper, singer, songwriter and model of Romani descent.

== Biography ==
Jentina Chapman was born on 6 March 1984 in Woking, England to a Romani family that consisted of fourteen children. When she was one year old, her family moved to West Molesey, Surrey. She got her first recording contract at the age of nineteen whilst working in a computer shop.

After an advertising campaign on television and features in various UK music magazines (notably NME), her debut single "Bad Ass Strippa" was released in the summer of 2004. The song was later parodied by grime MC Lady Sovereign. Sampling the O'Jays song "For the Love of Money", it reached number 22 on the UK Singles Chart. Jentina's second single, "French Kisses" was co-written by Jentina along with Cathy Dennis and Greg Wells and was a more electro-hop/R&B-oriented song. The single was released in the autumn of 2004, entering the UK chart at number 20. Jentina released another single after this in Italy only, "Mysterious". It reached the top 30 in Italy. Her debut album Jentina was then released, again only in Italy.

In 2005, "Bad Ass Strippa", "French Kisses" and "Mysterious" gained worldwide exposure after featuring in episodes of CSI: NY. In 2006, "Mysterious" underscored some of the audition stages of MTV's DanceLife.

During 2005, Jentina dated the Prodigy member Keith Flint. She also has a son called Ralph and a daughter called Annie.

Jentina was also a professional model. In November 2007, she represented lingerie brand Wonderbra, following on from the likes of Eva Herzigová and Caprice. She featured in a spoof video of the Cadbury's popular Gorilla television advertisement, in which a gorilla played the drums to the Phil Collins single, "In the Air Tonight".

During 2011, Jentina was in the judging panel for Travellers Got Talent, and she also appeared in the 8-part documentary A Gypsy Life for Me which aired on Bio in November 2011.

== Discography ==
=== Albums ===
Album	Tracklisting	Notes
Jentina	1. "Mysterious"; 2. "Bad Ass Strippa"; 3. "Wonderful Day" (featuring Dolamite); 4. "French Kisses"; 5. "Feels Good"; 6. "Gone"; 7. "Here I Come"; 8. "Sneakers"; 9. "Eenie Meenie" (skit); 10. "Smoke"; 11. "Baby"; 12. "Hard Times"	Released: 2005; Format: CD

=== Singles ===
Year	Title	Peak chart positions			Album
Year	Title	UK	AUS	ITA	Album
2004	"Bad Ass Strippa"	22	49	20	Jentina
2004	"French Kisses"^{1}	20	—	—	Jentina
2005	"Mysterious"^{2}	—	—	30	Jentina
"—" denotes releases that did not chart or was not released in that country or territory.

^{1} – Released in the United Kingdom only.
^{2} – Released in Italy only.
