= Jigsaw (Lady Sovereign album) =

Studio album by Lady Sovereign
- Released: 6 April 2009
- Recorded: 2008
- Genre: Grime; hip hop; electronica
- Label: EMI
- Producer: Dr. Luke; Benny Blanco; Medasyn

Lady Sovereign chronology
Public Warning (2006)	Jigsaw (2009)

Alternative cover

Singles from Jigsaw
- 1. "I Got You Dancing!" Released: December 2008; 2. "So Human" Released: 6 April 2009

Jigsaw is the second and final studio album by English rapper Lady Sovereign, released on 6 April 2009 in the United Kingdom and 7 April 2009 in the United States under Midget Records, with distribution by EMI.

== Background ==
The album is her first to be released independently. Sovereign once said, "I feel great now. I feel like I've overcome all my dark times. I get to pick who I want to work with. No one can tell me off or make me do things because I'm the boss. It feels amazing. I've got my own label and everything works my way."

The album is Sovereign's reaction and reflection of her popularity and the inability to cope with it, up to the point where she had suicidal thoughts. About the album, she said, "The album is the next chapter. It's a massive leap forward for mankind."

The album will also feature Sovereign singing; she explained, saying:

I was seeing someone, it was pretty deep. I was loved up. Then it all fucked up and I just wanted to sing about it really. I'm not the best singer in the world but you listen to it and you definitely feel it, you know. Rapping is second nature to me. I feel different when I sing. I feel lighter, it's fun.

She explained the album's title, saying it "makes sense to call the album Jigsaw because it's kind of like different genres".

=== Production and writing ===
The album includes production by Dr. Luke, Benny Blanco and Medasyn. Lady Sovereign said her first album was "not consistent", but "it worked" for her. On her new album, she went on to say, "A few of the tracks explain everything that's happened in the last two years, which I didn't get a chance to at the time." On production, she said she had been listening to electro and instrumental music. She stated that working with Medasyn is "an inspiration" because they "always come up with some weird beats together". Sovereign experimented with Auto-Tune in the album's lead single, "I Got You Dancing".

The opening track "Let's Be Mates" is a club-oriented dance song, while "Student Union" is a 1980s synth-driven track. "Jigsaw", the title track, is a rapcore song supplemented by strings with a sung chorus.

== Promotion ==
In early December 2008, Lady Sovereign uploaded a song on her MySpace profile entitled "I Got You Dancing", calling it "an early Christmas gift". In February 2009, Sovereign performed at The Echo in Los Angeles, California to promote Jigsaw. She performed at the South by Southwest Music Festival in Austin, Texas in mid-March and will embark on a North American tour beginning in May 2009 to promote the album.

== Reception ==
Professional ratings
Aggregate scores
Source	Rating
Metacritic	57/100
Review scores
Source	Rating
AllMusic	2.5/5 stars
The Austin Chronicle	3/4 stars
BBC Music	(favorable)
Billboard	(favorable)
The Boston Globe	(favorable)
Los Angeles Times	2/4 stars
The Observer	3/5 stars
Pitchfork Media	(3.1/10)
PopMatters	4/10 discs
Rolling Stone	2/5 stars

Initial critical response to Jigsaw was mixed. At Metacritic, which assigns a normalised rating out of 100 to reviews from mainstream critics, the album has received an average score of 57, based on 25 reviews. ClashMusic.com commented that "Jigsaw" is "a record where standout offerings seem such because of the lack of a considered segueing between arrangements". But the review concluded that progression from "Public Warning" was evident, and that some listeners "will fall instantly in love with the cheeky wit on show, at turns charming and caustic".

== Track listing ==
Jigsaw track listing
No.	Title	Writer(s)	Producer(s)	Length
1.	"Let's Be Mates"	Louise Harman, Gabriel Olegavich	Medasyn	3:20
2.	"So Human"	Harman, Lukasz Gottwald, Benjamin Levin, Robert Smith, Gabriel Olegavich	Medasyn	3:57
3.	"Jigsaw"	Harman, Olegavich	Medasyn	3:32
4.	"Bang Bang"	Harman, Olegavich	Medasyn	3:22
5.	"I Got You Dancing!"	Harman, Olegavich	Medasyn	3:34
6.	"Pennies"	Harman, Gottwald, Levin	Medasyn	3:05
7.	"Guitar"	Harman, Olegavich	Medasyn	3:33
8.	"Student Union"	Harman, Olegavich	Medasyn	3:06
9.	"Food Play"	Harman, Olegavich	Medasyn	5:13
10.	"I Got the Goods"	Harman, Olegavich	Medasyn	3:02

Japan bonus tracks
No.	Title	Length
11.	"So Human" (Sinden Remix)	4:35
12.	"I Got You Dancing" (Jack Beats Remix)	5:36
13.	"Jigsaw" (Taku Takahashi Remix)	5:36

Limited edition bonus CD
No.	Title	Length
1.	"I Got You Dancing" (Jack Beats Remix)	5:35
2.	"I Got You Dancing" (Semothy Jones Remix)	4:08
3.	"I Got You Dancing" (Medasyn Remix)	5:22
4.	"So Human" (Soggy Face Remix)	4:27
5.	"So Human" (Sinden Remix)	4:35
6.	"I Got You Dancing" (Medasyn Remix)	5:22
7.	"I Got You Dancing" (video)
8.	"So Human" (video)

iTunes bonus track
No.	Title	Length
11.	"I Got You Dancing" (Semothy Jones Remix)	4:06

== Charts ==
Chart performance for Jigsaw
Chart (2009)	Peak position
ARIA Urban Albums Chart	11
UK Albums Chart	121

== Release history ==
Release history and formats for Jigsaw
Region	Date
United Kingdom	6 April 2009
United States	7 April 2009
Australia	17 April 2009
