= 9 to 5 (Lady Sovereign song) =

2005 single by Lady Sovereign

Single by Lady Sovereign

from the album Public Warning
- Released: 8 August 2005
- Length: 3:23
- Label: Island; Def Jam
- Songwriters: Louise Harman; Gabriel Olegavich
- Producer: Medasyn

Lady Sovereign singles chronology
"Random" (2005)	"9 to 5" (2005)	"Hoodie" (2005)

Alternative cover
- CD2 and 12-inch cover

"9 to 5" is a song recorded by English rapper Lady Sovereign. Released as the second single from the rapper's debut studio album Public Warning (2006), following the release of her first UK top 75 single "Random". It was her debut single for Def Jam Recordings and was released on 8 August 2005. It contains a sample from the British movie Time Bandits.

The single became Lady Sovereign's first top 40 hit in the UK, peaking at number 33 on the singles chart. The single was backed by a remix by indie band the Ordinary Boys. "9 to 5" also had three videos, one for the original and another two for "The Ordinary Boys Remix".

== Track listings ==
CD single 1

1. "9 to 5" (original version) – 3:23
2. "Tango" – 3:36

CD single 2

1. "9 to 5" (original version)
2. "Nine2Five" (The Ordinary Boys remix) – 3:25
3. "9 to 5" (JME remix)
4. "9 to 5" (Tony Senghore's Sleepwalker vocal mix)
5. "9 to 5" (Tony Senghore's Gosh Darn It! dub)
6. "9 to 5" (video)

12-inch single

- A1 "9 to 5" (original version)
- A2 "9 to 5" (JME remix)
- A3 "9 to 5" (Tony Senghore's No Turning Back mix)
- B1 "9 to 5" (Tony Senghore's Sleepwalker vocal mix)
- B2 "9 to 5" (Tony Senghore's Gosh Darn It! dub)

== "Nine2Five" ==
"Nine2Five"

Single by the Ordinary Boys vs. Lady Sovereign

from the album How to Get Everything You Ever Wanted in Ten Easy Steps
- Released: 22 May 2006
- Genre: Ska-pop
- Length: 3:00
- Label: Polydor
- Songwriters: Louise Harman; Gabriel Olegavich; Sam Preston; William J. Brown
- Producer: Medasyn

Lady Sovereign singles chronology
"Hoodie" (2005)	"Nine2Five" (2006)	"Love Me or Hate Me" (2006)

The Ordinary Boys singles chronology
"Boys Will Be Boys" (2006)	"Nine2Five" (2006)	"Lonely at the Top" (2006)

Alternative cover
- The Re-Match

"Nine2Five" is the renamed and re-recorded "The Ordinary Boys" remix of Lady Sovereign's single "9 to 5". The remix was released as a duet single and was credited as the Ordinary Boys vs. Lady Sovereign and was the seventh for the Ordinary Boys and the fourth for Lady Sovereign. A new music video was shot for the single, but Lady Sovereign had to film her parts for the re-make in the US.

The single's re-release was a much bigger hit than the original, peaking 27 places higher than the original at number six on the UK Singles Chart, becoming Lady Sovereign's first UK top-10 hit and the Ordinary Boys' second.

=== Track listings ===
CD single 1

1. "Nine2Five" – the Ordinary Boys vs. Lady Sovereign – 3:05
2. "My Girl" (featuring Suggs live at Brixton Academy) – the Ordinary Boys – 2:53

7-inch single 1 – The Re-Match

1. "Nine2Five" – the Ordinary Boys vs. Lady Sovereign
2. "9 to 5" (The Ordinary Boys remix) – Lady Sovereign – 3:25

7-inch single 2

1. "Nine2Five" – the Ordinary Boys vs. Lady Sovereign
2. "On an Island" (Live at Brixton Academy) – the Ordinary Boys

== Charts ==
=== "9 to 5" ===
Chart (2005)	Peak position
Ireland (IRMA)	44
Scotland Singles (Official Charts)	33
UK Singles (Official Charts)	33

=== "Nine2Five" ===
==== Weekly charts ====
Chart (2006)	Peak position
Europe (Eurochart Hot 100)	20
Ireland (IRMA)	25
Scotland Singles (Official Charts)	6
UK Singles (Official Charts)	6

==== Year-end charts ====
Chart (2006)	Position
UK Singles (OCC)	141
