= Lady Sovereign =

British rapper (born 1985)

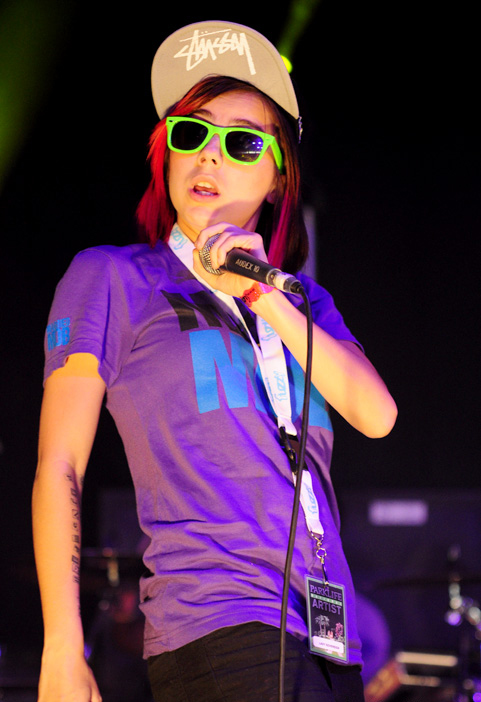
- Lady Sovereign at Parklife 2009

Background information
- Also known as: Lady Sovereign; SOV; Big Midget
- Born: Louise Amanda Harman; December 19, 1985 (age 40)
- Origin: Wembley, London, England
- Genres: Hip hop; UK garage; grime
- Occupations: Rapper; songwriter
- Years active: 2001–2010 (Note: On hiatus)
- Labels: Casual; Chocolate; Def Jam; EMI; Midget

Louise Amanda Harman (born December 19, 1985), better known by the stage name Lady Sovereign, is an English rapper, best known for the songs "9 to 5" and "Love Me or Hate Me". She was signed to Def Jam in 2005 by Jay-Z.

== Early life and family ==
Harman grew up in Chalkhill Estate in Wembley Park, London. In 2004, she said "When I heard Ms. Dynamite's track 'Booo!' in 2001 it inspired me. I hadn't heard a female MC before that. She's real. Her presence, her image, the way she does everything... she opened so many doors for us girls, MCs are real, they write their own stuff, they rap about what they know, the stuff around them."

Harman began uploading some of her songs and a picture to various music web sites when she was 15. She told Newsweek in 2006 that comments initially ran along the lines of, "You're white. You're a girl. You're British. You're crap."

Harman signed with Universal in 2004. She released a number of solo records and opened for Basement Jaxx, the Streets, Dizzee Rascal, D12 and Obie Trice.

Her mother, Nicola, was diagnosed with a terminal brain tumour and died on 14 March 2010 (Mothering Sunday in the UK).

== Career ==
=== 2004–2006: Early singles and EPs ===
"The Battle" began a string of singles that would push Lady Sovereign into the spotlight. While "A Little Bit of Shhh!", "9 to 5", and "Sad Arse Stripah" were selling well, free Internet-only freestyles like "Tango" and "Cheeky" were becoming just as popular. On 15 November 2005, Chocolate Industries released the Vertically Challenged EP, which collected most of her singles recorded to date. In April 2006 she released her second EP, Blah Blah in the UK. She released yet another EP, but was limited for US radios; Size Don't Matter!

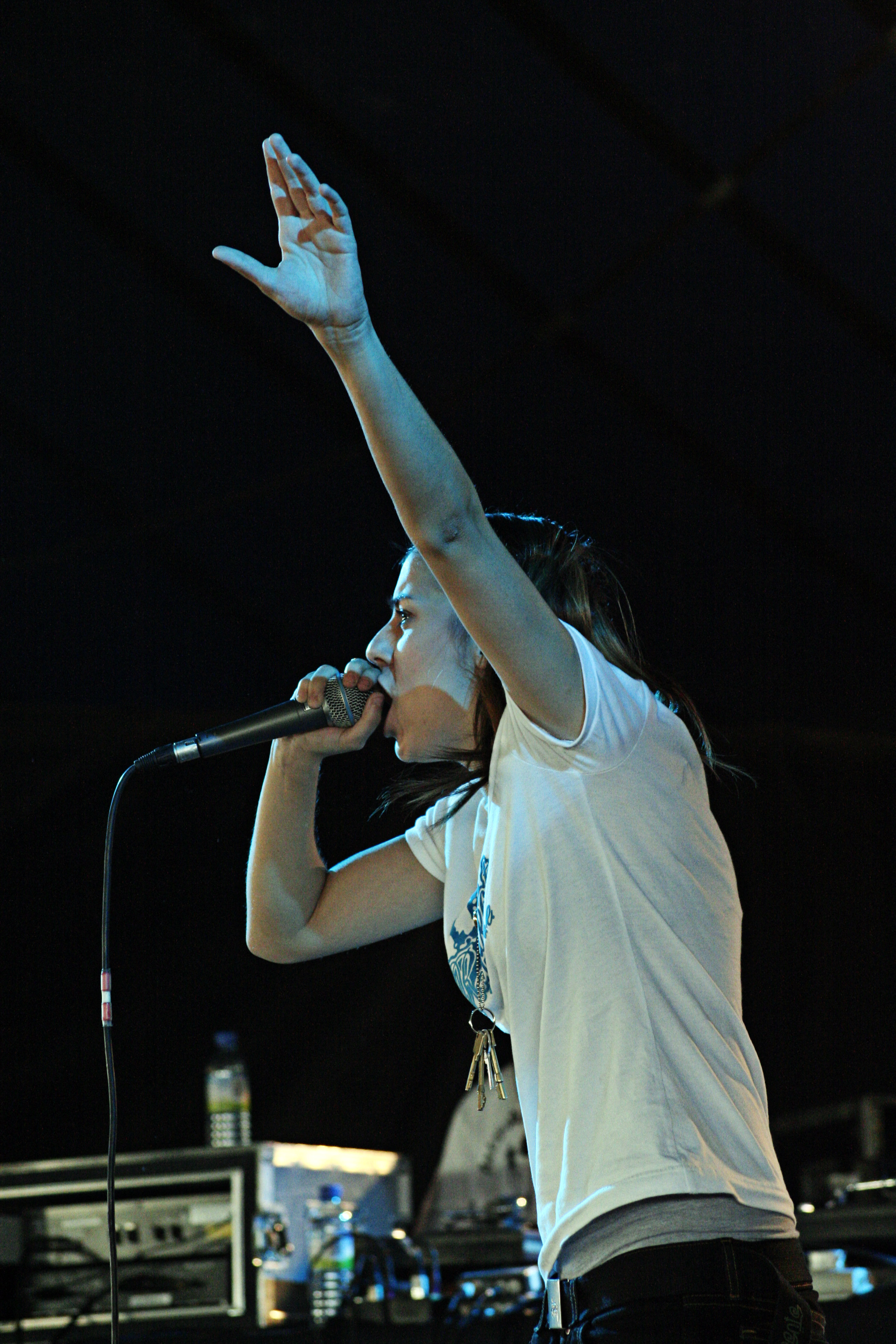
Lady Sovereign at Reading Festival, 2006

Aside from her own records, 2005 saw Lady Sovereign appear as a guest or contributor on several projects. She began 2005 by appearing on the grime compilation Run the Road, both as a solo artist and with The Streets. When The Ordinary Boys released the single "Boys Will Be Boys", Lady Sovereign came back with a reply remix, featuring the music and chorus of the original, but with mostly her own vocals to the tune of "girls will be girls". In May 2006, she was featured on the Ordinary Boys single, "Nine2Five", a remixed version of her own "9 to 5", credited as "The Ordinary Boys vs Lady Sovereign." "Nine2Five" entered the UK top 40 singles at number 39 on downloads only, and jumped to number 6 upon availability as a CD and 7" vinyl single during the week commencing 22 May 2005. This is her highest chart position to date.

=== 2006–2007: Public Warning ===
Lady Sovereign capped off 2005 by meeting with the American hip hop artist and CEO of the labels Def Jam Recordings and Roc-A-Fella Records, Jay-Z. This marked her foray into the American music scene. With Usher and L.A. Reid seated next to him, Jay-Z asked for one on-the-spot freestyle from Sovereign before offering her a contract with Def Jam. With the single "Hoodie", Lady Sovereign released her full-length debut, Public Warning, on Def Jam in 2006. Lady Sovereign is the first non-American female to ever be signed to Def Jam Record Label.

On 31 October 2006, her debut album, Public Warning, was released, featuring "Random", "9 to 5", "Hoodie" and single, "Love Me or Hate Me", which was also released on the same day. The music video for the single features Lady Sovereign mocking stereotypical ideals of femininity by satirizing popular dress and mannerisms. Some of the lyrics include I'm fat, I need a diet/No, in fact I'm just here lyin'/I ain't got the biggest breast-ises,/but I write all the best disses/I've got hairy armpits/But I don't walk around like this/I wear a big baggy t-shirt that hides that nasty shit. With the lyrics continuing in this satirical nature, Lady Sovereign continues to comment on and express her dissonance with female lifestyles in popular culture. She began an American tour on 23 October 2006 and soon after appeared on Late Show with David Letterman. In addition to her own tour, she appeared as the opening act for various artists, including The Streets and Gwen Stefani on her 2007 The Sweet Escape Tour.

On 17 October 2006 "Love Me or Hate Me" became the first video by a British artist to reach number 1 on the United States (and original) version of MTV's Total Request Live. "Love Me or Hate Me" was released in the UK on 29 January 2007, with the album following on 5 February 2007.

Lady Sovereign has recorded a cover of the Sex Pistols' "Pretty Vacant" for Music from The O.C. Mix 6 – Covering Our Tracks

=== 2008–2009: Jigsaw ===
Lady Sovereign released a second album in spring 2009. She also went on tour. After a final dispute with Island Records, it was revealed on her official website that she would release the album through her independent record label, Midget Records, and that it was fully written and some songs were already recorded. The album was announced to be released in the United States and United Kingdom on 7 April 2009. On 8 December 2008, Lady Sovereign restated that Jigsaw would be released on 6 April 2009. She also released a free single titled "I Got You Dancing", making it available on her MySpace and official website. During her "Jigsaw" tour she teamed up with DJ Annalyze as her tour DJ.

== Television and commercial appearances ==
Lady Sovereign has appeared on Soccer AM several times. She has appeared in a feature story on Cartoon Network and in an educational movie called X-ED.

In late 2006, "Love Me Or Hate Me" was played in a Verizon Wireless advertisement. It also appears on the soundtrack of the video game Need for Speed: Carbon, and became the theme song for the first season of reality TV show Bad Girls Club. "9 to 5" also appeared on an episode of the aforementioned Bad Girls Club, as well as on the soundtrack of the Xbox 360's version of EA Sports' FIFA World Cup 2006 video game, on the Ugly Betty soundtrack and features in the 2007 film St Trinian's, "Random" appears on the Midnight Club 3: DUB Edition Remix soundtrack, and features on an episode of Malcolm in The Middle, "I Got You Dancing" was featured in Need for Speed: Nitro, "Hoodie" was used for a Mario Party Nintendo DS commercial.

Some of Lady Sovereign's such as "9 to 5" and "So Human" were also used on the BBC 1 show Waterloo Road in 2009/10. Bizarre Creation's Project Gotham Racing 4 video game on the Xbox 360 features the song "Blah Blah" by Lady Sovereign, EA's Fight Night Round 4 video game features Lady Sovereign's "Bang Bang" track, "So Human" appears in season 2 episode 1 of the television series '90210', "Jigsaw" was featured in the second episode of the fifth season of MTV reality show The Hills, called 'Everything Happens For A Reason'.

On 23 October 2006, Sovereign made an appearance on American talk show the Late Show with David Letterman. During her performance of "Love Me Or Hate Me" the lyrics "If you hate me, then fuck you" were changed to "if you hate me, then I hate you". Lady Sovereign served as the host and spokesperson for Adult Swim and Chocolate Industries' Chocolate Swim. In January 2010, Bally Total Fitness selected Lady Sovereign and her song "I Got You Dancing" for the featured artist section on their website, the song is also being used in their television commercials.

On 22 January 2010, Sovereign was due to appear on This Week, a BBC political review show, to discuss the laws regarding self-defence for householders. Early in the programme, she was shown backstage waving to camera in anticipation of her appearance. However, when the segment began, presenter Andrew Neil apologised to viewers and explained the rapper had "done a runner." Neil instead discussed the topic with regular contributors Michael Portillo and Diane Abbott and concluded by joking "Who needs Lady Sovereign? Who is Lady Sovereign?" Abbott laughed and responded "I don't know." In an interview with The Guardian's Rich Pelley on 30 January, Lady Sovereign said of the incident: "I had a panic attack! My hands went stiff and I started hyperventilating. I didn't want to do it hours before but I went anyway, then I just changed my mind at the last minute, I guess."

Lady Sovereign appeared on the British game show Total Wipeout's eighth celebrity special. She made it to the second round by default but failed to advance any further. She was the third evicted housemate from the seventh series of Celebrity Big Brother. She was nominated for both the first and second evictions. Having survived the first double eviction, she was evicted the second time around with 69.5% of the vote.

== Controversies ==
In September 2009, while in Brisbane, Australia for the Parklife Festival, Lady Sovereign was arrested for assault and drunk and disorderly behaviour after spitting on a nightclub bouncer. She had only been in the country seven hours before the assault occurred. She was ordered to pay a fine of $400 AUD, and $200 AUD in compensation to the bouncer.

Lady Sovereign was involved in a feud with fellow English rapper Jentina.

== Personal life ==
In a 2010 interview with Diva magazine, Lady Sovereign said she came out as a lesbian in the house during Celebrity Big Brother but that her declaration did not end up in the broadcast show.

Lady Sovereign has not released any music since 2009. She previously spoke about medical issues halting her career. In 2022, Lady Sovereign confirmed that she had been diagnosed with the rare disorder cyclic vomiting syndrome.

== Awards and nominations ==
Award	Year	Nominee(s)	Category	Result	Ref.
mtvU Woodie Awards	2006	Herself	Left Field Woodie	Nominated	
UK Festival Awards	2006	Herself	Best Urban Act	Nominated	

== Discography ==
Lady Sovereign discography
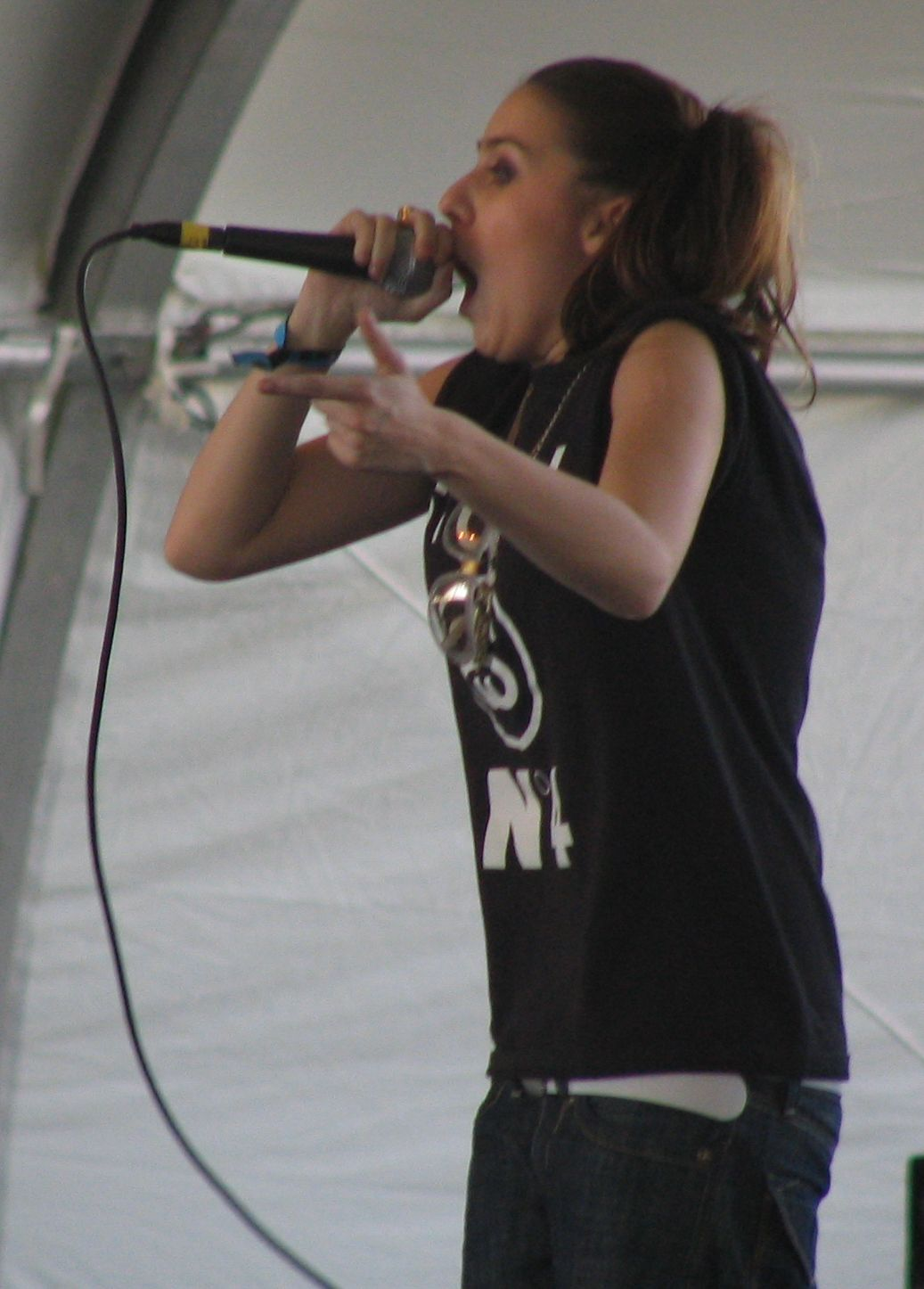
- Studio albums: 2
- Extended plays: 2
- Singles: 7
- Music videos: 12

=== Studio albums ===
List of studio albums, with selected details and chart positions
Title	Album details	Peak chart positions			
Title	Album details	UK	AUS	AUS Urban	US
Public Warning	Released: 31 October 2006; Label: Island Records, Def Jam; Formats: CD, digital download	58	97	10	48
Jigsaw	Released: 6 April 2009; Label: Midget Records, EMI; Formats: CD, digital download	121	—	11	—
"—" denotes items which were not released in that country or failed to chart.

=== EPs ===
List of EPs, with selected details
Title	EP details
Vertically Challenged	Released: 15 November 2005; Format: CD, digital download; Label: Chocolate Industries
Blah Blah	Released: 17 April 2006; Format: CD, digital download; Label: Chocolate Industries

=== Mixtapes ===
List of mixtapes, with selected details
Title	Mixtape details
Chocolate Swim	Released: June 2006; Format: digital download; Label: Chocolate Industries
Jig-Raw!	Released: 2009; Format: digital download; Label: Independent

=== Singles ===
List of singles, with selected chart positions
Title	Year	Peak chart positions										Album
Title	Year	UK	UK D/L	AUS	AUS Urban	DEN	FIN	GER	IRE	US	US Dance	Album
"Random"	2005	73	—	—	—	—	—	—	—	—	—	Public Warning
"9 to 5"	2005	33	141	—	—	—	—	—	44	—	—	Public Warning
"Hoodie"	2005	44	—	—	—	—	—	—	46	—	—	Public Warning
"Nine2Five" (vs. The Ordinary Boys)	2006	6	12	—	—	—	—	—	25	—	—	How to Get Everything You; Ever Wanted in Ten Easy Steps
"Love Me or Hate Me"	2006	26	—	48	9	17	10	65	—	45	1	Public Warning
"Those Were the Days"	2007	101	—	—	—	—	—	—	—	—	—	Public Warning
"So Human"	2009	38	—	36	—	26	—	—	—	—	—	Jigsaw
"I Got You Dancing"	2009	—	—	—	—	38	—	—	—	—	—	Jigsaw
"—" denotes items which were not released in that country or failed to chart.

=== Promotional singles ===
List of promotional singles
Title	Year	Album
"Ch Ching (Cheque 1 2)"	2004	Vertically Challenged
"A Little Bit of Shhh"	2005	Public Warning
"Blah Blah"	2006	Public Warning
