= Random (Lady Sovereign song) =

Single by Lady Sovereign

from the album Vertically Challenged and Public Warning
- Released: 14 March 2005
- Recorded: 2004
- Genre: Grime; hip hop
- Length: 3:30
- Label: Casual
- Songwriter(s): Louise Harman; Gabriel Olegavich
- Producer(s): Menta

Lady Sovereign singles chronology
"Random" (2005)	"9 to 5" (2005)

"Random" is the first CD single from UK hip hop artist Lady Sovereign, following the release of her 12" promotional vinyl single "Ch Ching (Cheque 1 2)" in 2004. It was her second and last single for Casual Records in 2005. The electronic music, hip hop, and rap song was later included in her 2006 Def Jam debut LP, "Public Warning".

== Composition ==
The first rapped line in the song references the hit song "Tipsy" by J-Kwon. Part of her random list of references is to getting drunk on alcohol: "E'rybody in the club getting tipsy/ Oh, fuck that, just wine like a gypsy."

The title and lyrics are about "random" things, which The Awl described as the most hated word of the Millenial generation.

== Charts ==
The single was Lady Sovereign's first to make the UK top 75, peaking at No. 73 there, and spending one week within the top 75. It was also "#8 on Pitchfork's Top 50 Singles of 2005."

== Performances ==
At the 2006 South by Southwest, it was her opening song, and due to technical difficulties, one of the few she could sing at that music festival, a review describing Lady Sovereign by the British working class pejorative, chav.

By Lady Sovereign's 2009 concert at the beach resort of Brighton, the song was described as an "old fave", or part of her standard repertoire, and was in the middle of her set list.

== Reviews and legacy ==
After the single release, she was signed by Def Jam Recordings and this single is considered to be her breakthrough into the mainstream market. Pitchfork called it "the best the best rap track" of 2005.

"Random" was featured on an episode of The O.C. aired on April 27, 2006, playing in the background during the senior prom in Season 3, Episode 23 - "The Party Favor", and was featured as a track on Midnight Club 3: Dub Edition Remix . A remix of this song was played on the "Jamalot" episode of CSI: NY.

== Track listings ==
The Remixes - 12" promo single

- A1 "Random" (Menta remix feat. Riko)
- A2 "Random" (Menta instrumental)
- B1 "Random" (A. Rucker & Sinden vocal mix)
- B2 "Random" (A. Rucker & Sinden instrumental)
- B3 "Random" (Menta accapella feat. Riko)

12" single

- A1 "Random" (original mix)
- A2 "Random" (instrumental)
- B3 "Random" (accapella)
- B1 "Random" (Menta remix feat. Riko)
- B2 "Random" (A. Rucker & Sinden remix)

CD single

1. "Random" (original radio edit) - 3:39
2. "Random" (Menta remix feat. Riko) - 4:57
3. "Random" (A. Brucker & Sinden remix) - 3:50
4. Video #1
5. Video #2

Digital EP

1. "Random" (Menta remix) - 5:01
2. "Random" - 3:46
3. "Random" (A. Brucker & Sinden vocal mix) - 3:49
