= Vertically Challenged (EP) =

EP by Lady Sovereign
- Released: 15 November 2005
- Genre: Hip hop; grime; UK garage
- Label: Chocolate Industries

Lady Sovereign chronology
Vertically Challenged (2005)	Blah Blah (2006)

Alternate Cover
- Limited Edition and Australian Cover

Professional ratings
Review scores
Source	Rating
AllMusic	4/5 stars
Robert Christgau	A−
Los Angeles Times	3/4 stars
Pitchfork	6.5/10
Stylus Magazine	A−

Vertically Challenged is the debut EP from UK hip hop artist Lady Sovereign. It was only released in the United States and Australia.

The EP features the UK hit single "Random" and a remix of her limited edition white-label single "Ch Ching (Cheque 1 2)".

In the United States, a limited edition was manufactured containing a bonus DVD. The limited edition was not released in Australia.

== Critical reception ==
The Detroit Metro Times wrote that the EP "suitably reps Lady Sovereign's ample cockiness and lyrical zing." Slate commended Sovereign's "tunefully bratty delivery." Billboard praised Vertically Challenged's "hands-in-the-air breakbeats, Colecovision sound effects, [and] nut-job lyrics delivered in great Cockney fashion."

== Track listings ==
CD

1. "Random"
2. "Ch Ching (Cheque 1 2)" (remix)
3. "Fiddle with the Volume"
4. "Random" (Menta remix featuring Riko)
5. "A Little Bit of Shhh"
6. "The Battle" (featuring Frost P, Shystie & Zuz Rock)
7. "A Little Bit of Shhh" (Smallstars remix by Ad-Rock)
8. "Fiddle with the Volume" (Ghislain Poirier remix)

Limited Edition DVD:

1. 30-minute documentary - including the videos for "Random", "Ch Ching (Cheque 1 2)", "A Little Bit of Shhh" and "Random (Menta remix featuring Riko)".

12" vinyl
Side A

1. "Random"
2. "Ch Ching (Cheque 1 2)" (remix)

Side B

1. "Fiddle with the Volume"
2. "Random" (Menta remix featuring Riko)

Side C

1. "A Little Bit of Shhh"
2. "The Battle" (featuring Frost P, Shystie & Zuz Rock)

Side D

1. "A Little Bit of Shhh" (Smallstars remix by Ad-Rock)
2. "Fiddle with the Volume" (Ghislain Poirier remix)
3. "Ch Ching" (Spank Rock remix)
- The EP was only available in a "censored" or "clean/edited" form, which removed all profanity with backmasking.
