= Media works and appearances of Paris Hilton =

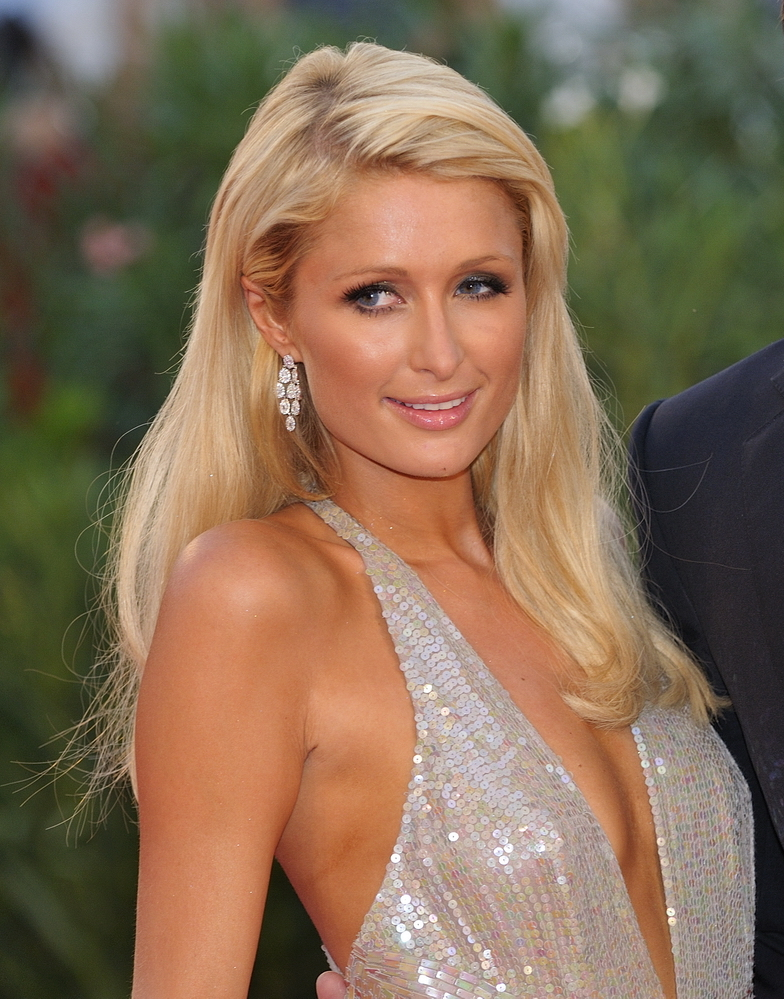
Hilton in September 2009

This article documents the professional media works and appearances of Paris Hilton.

== Film ==
Year	Title	Role	Format	Notes	Ref.
1992	Wishman	Girl on beach	Feature film	Uncredited appearance	
2001	Zoolander	Herself	Feature film	Cameo appearance	
2002	Sweetie Pie	—N/a	Short film	Supporting role	
2002	QIK2JDG	Strung-out supermodel	Short film	Supporting role	
2002	Nine Lives	Jo	Feature film	Leading role	
2003	Wonderland	Barbie	Feature film	Cameo appearance	
2003	The Cat in the Hat	Clubgoer	Feature film	Cameo appearance	
2003	Pauly Shore Is Dead	Herself	Feature film	Cameo appearance	
2004	Win a Date with Tad Hamilton!	Heather	Feature film	Uncredited appearance; deleted scenes	
2004	The Hillz	Heather Smith	Feature film	Leading role	
2004	Raising Helen	Amber	Feature film	Supporting role	
2005	House of Wax	Paige Edwards	Feature film	Supporting role	
2006	Bottoms Up	Lisa Mancini	Feature film	Leading role	
2006	National Lampoon's Pledge This!	Victoria English	Feature film	Leading role and executive producer	
2007	America the Beautiful	Herself	Documentary film	Cameo appearance	
2007	Stories USA	Sadie	Feature film	Supporting role; segment L.A. Knights	
2008	The Hottie and the Nottie	Cristabel Abbott	Feature film	Leading role and executive producer	
2008	Repo! The Genetic Opera	Amber Sweet	Feature film	Supporting role	
2008	An American Carol	Herself	Feature film	Cameo appearance	
2008	Paris, Not France	Herself	Documentary film	Subject	
2008	Hotel Gramercy Park	Herself	Documentary film	Cameo appearance	
2009	The Chronicles of Holly-Weird	Herself	Short mockumentary film	Cameo appearance	
2010	Skippy Sundance	Herself	Documentary film	Cameo appearance	
2010	With Great Power: The Stan Lee Story	Herself	Documentary film	Cameo appearance	
2010	Teenage Paparazzo	Herself	Documentary film	Supporting cast member	
2012	Sunset Strip	Herself	Documentary film	Cameo appearance	
2013	The Bling Ring	Herself	Feature film	Cameo appearance	
2015	Jeremy Scott: The People's Designer	Herself	Documentary film	Cameo appearance	
2017	And the Winner Isn't	Herself	Documentary film	Cameo appearance	
2018	The American Meme	Herself	Documentary film	Subject and executive producer	
2019	Paris'in Sirri	Herself	Feature film	Cameo appearance	
2019	That Click	Herself	Documentary film	Cameo appearance	
2019	Chiara Ferragni: Unposted	Herself	Documentary film	Cameo appearance	
2020	This Is Paris	Herself	Documentary film	Subject and producer	
2020	Sorry or What Could Have Been	Adult Sid	Short film	Supporting role and executive producer	
2021	The Disruptors	Herself	Documentary film	Cameo appearance	
2021	A Fashion Thing	Herself	Short mockumentary film	Cameo appearance	
2021	Off Hiatus	Herself	Short mockumentary film	Cameo appearance	
2022	Alone at Night	Trap Stars host	Feature film	Supporting role	
2024	The Trainer	Herself	Feature film	Cameo appearance	
2026	Infinite Icon: A Visual Memoir	Herself	Concert film	Subject and executive producer	
2026	Little Brother	Herself	Feature film	Cameo appearance	
2026	Paw Patrol: The Dino Movie	Nancy	Feature film	Voice role	
2026	4000 Days	—N/a	Documentary film	Executive producer	
2026	Repo! This Movie: The Anatomy of a Cult	Herself	Documentary film	Supporting cast member	
2027	The It Girls: Inside the 2000s	Herself	Documentary film	Subject and executive producer	
TBA	Clashing Through the Snow	Herself	Feature film	Cameo appearance	
TBA	Road to Reality	—N/a	Feature film	Executive producer	

== Television ==
Year	Title	Role (Note: It also indicates the type of credit Hilton held in non-narrative productions.)	Format	Notes	Ref.
2003	Entertainment Tonight	Special correspondent	News program	Coverage of New York Fashion Week	
2003	Da Ali G Show	Herself	Sketch comedy series	Uncredited appearance; episode: "Law"	
2003	Hollywood Squares	Panelist	Game show	5 episodes	
2003; 2005	Saturday Night Live	Uncredited performer and host	Live sketch comedy variety series	S29E7 and S30E11	
2003–2007	The Simple Life	Subject and executive producer (Note: She served as an executive producer from 2005 to 2007.)	Reality series	56 episodes (Note: Including one special.)	
2004	Teen Choice Awards	Co-host	Special	Duties shared with Nicole Richie	
2004	MTV Movie Awards	Presenter	Special	Category: Best Kiss	
2004	Las Vegas	Madison	Scripted series	Episode: "Things That Go Jump in the Night"	
2004	George Lopez	Ashley	Scripted series	Episode: "Jason Tutors Max"	
2004	The O.C.	Kate	Scripted series	Episode: "The L.A."	
2004	Veronica Mars	Caitlin Ford	Scripted series	Episode: "Credit Where Credit's Due"	
2005	American Dreams	Barbara Eden	Scripted series	Episode: "California Dreamin'"	
2005	Movie Life: House of Wax	Subject	Miniseries	5 episodes	
2005	I Want to Be a Hilton	Guest star	Competitive reality series	Episode dated June 28	
2005	Balls of Steel	Guest star	Game show	Episode dated August 19	
2005	MTV Spring Break: Cancun	Guest star	Special		
2005	MTV Video Music Awards	Presenter	Special	Category: Viewer's Choice	
2005	American Music Awards	Presenter	Special	Category: Favorite Soul/R&B Album	
2005; 2006	The Girls Next Door	Guest star	Reality series	2 episodes	
2005; 2008	Wetten, dass..?	Guest star	Variety series	2 episodes	
2006	Girls Aloud: Off the Record	Herself	Reality series	Cameo appearance; episode dated April 11	
2006	The Hills	Herself	Reality series	Uncredited appearance; episode: "New City, New Drama"	
2006	Rock Legends: Platinum Weird	Herself	Mockumentary	Cameo appearance	
2006	This Is Paris	Subject	Special		
2006	Brit Awards	Presenter	Special	Category: International Album	
2006	MTV Video Music Awards	Presenter	Special	Introduced The All-American Rejects	
2006	American Music Awards	Presenter	Special	Category: Favorite Soul/R&B Male Artist	
2007	Scream Awards	Presenter	Special	Introduced a preview of Repo! The Genetic Opera	
2007	America's Next Top Model	Guest star	Competitive reality series	Episode: "The Girl Who Gets Thrown in the Pool"	
2007; 2009	Bondi Rescue	Guest star	Reality series	2 episodes	
2007; 2009	SMAP×SMAP	Guest star	Variety series	2 episodes	
2008	Pop Fiction	Guest star	Practical joke series	Episode: "Paris Hilton/Avril Lavigne"	
2008	My Name Is Earl	Herself	Scripted series	Episode: "I Won't Die with a Little Help from My Friends"	
2008	Family Guy	Herself	Animated series	Voice role; episode: "I Dream of Jesus"	
2008	American Music Awards	Presenter	Special	Category: Artist of the Year	
2008–2009	Paris Hilton's My New BFF	Co-creator, executive producer, and host	Competitive reality series	24 episodes (Note: Including four specials.)	
2008; 2010	The Ellen DeGeneres Show	Guest star	Talk show	S6E39 and S7E153 (Note: Only episodes featuring segment participation are listed; standard interview appearances are omitted.)	
2009	Paris Hilton's British Best Friend	Co-creator, executive producer, and host	Competitive reality series	8 episodes	
2009	Supernatural	Leshii	Scripted series	Episode: "Fallen Idols"	
2009	Ant & Dec's Saturday Night Takeaway	Guest announcer	Variety series	Episode dated February 14	
2009	Dogg After Dark	Guest star	Variety series	Episode dated February 17	
2009	Fearne and…	Guest star	Documentary series	Episode: "Paris Hilton"	
2009	Var mısın? Yok musun?	Guest star	Game show	Episode dated May 31	
2009	Kathy Griffin: My Life on the D-List	Guest star	Reality series	Episode: "Paris Is My New BFF"	
2009	NYC Prep	Herself	Reality series	Cameo appearance; episode: "Guest of Guests"	
2009	Denise Richards: It's Complicated	Herself	Reality series	Cameo appearance; episode: "Denise Does Slamdance"	
2009	Hi Society: The Wonderful World of Nicky Haslam	Herself	Special	Cameo appearance	
2009	Rex	Paris	Pilot	Unaired	
2009	Street Customs	Guest star	Reality series	Episode: "Escalade & Smart Car"	
2010	I Get That a Lot	Guest star	Reality series	Episode dated January 6	
2010	Late Show with David Letterman	Top Ten List presenter	Talk show	Episode dated February 3 (Note: Only episodes featuring segment participation are listed; standard interview appearances are omitted.)	
2010	Dr. Phil	Guest star	Talk show	Episode: "Dr. Phil Confronts Animal Abusers"	
2010	Hell's Kitchen	Guest star	Competitive reality series	Episode: "5 Chefs Compete"	
2010	Piers Morgan On...	Guest star	Documentary series	Episode: "Las Vegas"	
2010	The Jacksons: A Family Dynasty	Guest star	Reality series	Episode: "Come Together"	
2010	The Celebrity Agency	Guest star	Reality series	Episode dated October 16	
2010	The Dog Who Saved Christmas Vacation	Bella	Animated film	Voice role	
2011	Paris Hilton's Dubai BFF	Co-creator, executive producer and host	Competitive reality series	9 episodes	
2011	The World According to Paris	Subject and executive producer	Reality series	8 episodes	
2011	The Hard Times of RJ Berger	Herself	Scripted series	Episode: "The Lock-In"	
2011	Tunay na Buhay	Guest star	Documentary series	Episode dated August 19	
2011	When I Was 17	Guest star	Talk show	Episode dated September 17	
2012–2013	Paradise Hotel	Guest star	Competitive reality series	4 episodes	
2013	VIP Brother 5	Guest star	Competitive reality series	3 episodes	
2013	Hay una cosa que te quiero decir	Guest star	Talk show	Episode dated February 5	
2013	Les Ch'tis	Guest star	Reality series	Episode: "Les ch'tis à Hollywood"	
2013–2020	The Real Housewives of Beverly Hills	Guest star	Reality series	4 episodes	
2014	Fashion Rocks	Presenter	Special		
2014	Untold	Guest star	News program	Episode: "Rag to Reality; Star Stalkers; EDM-Pire"	
2015	Ramez in Control	Guest star	Practical joke series	Episode: "#1.9"	
2016	Los Gipsy Kings	Guest star	Reality series	Episode: "Conociendo a Paris Hilton"	
2017	So Cosmo	Guest star	Reality series	Episode: "Vol. 1, No. 4: Fun Fearless Money"	
2017	Emigratis	Guest star	Satirical travel series	Episode: "Foggia, Dubai, Abu Dhabi, Isola Yas"	
2018	The Grand Tour	Guest star	Motoring series	Episode: "Oh, Canada"	
2018	The Toys That Made Us	Guest star	Documentary series	Episode: "Hello Kitty"	
2018	Hollywood Love Story	Host	Documentary series	8 episodes	
2018–2020	The Talk	Guest co-host	Talk show	3 episodes (Note: Only episodes featuring her as a guest co-host are listed; standard interview appearances are omitted.)	
2019	Martha & Snoop's Potluck Dinner Party	Guest star	Variety series	Episode: "Holiday Frost Fight"	
2019; 2021	Keeping Up with the Kardashians	Guest star	Reality series	2 episodes	
2019; 2025	Germany's Next Topmodel	Guest judge	Competitive reality series	2 episodes	
2020	The Dr. Oz Show	Guest star	Talk show	Episode dated September 18	
2020	Savage X Fenty Show Vol. 2	Performer	Special		
2020	American Music Awards	Presenter	Special	Category: New Artist of the Year	
2021	RuPaul's Drag Race	Guest star	Competitive reality series	Episode: "Grand Finale"	
2021	Martha Gets Down and Dirty	Guest star	Reality series	Episode: "Martha Vegs Out"	
2021	The Curse of Von Dutch: A Brand to Die For	Guest star	Documentary miniseries	2 episodes	
2021	Cooking with Paris	Host and executive producer	Cooking series	6 episodes	
2021	Tubi's Super Nostalgia Reunion	Participant	Special		
2021	MTV Movie & TV Awards	Presenter	Special	Category: Reality Royalty Award	
2021–2023	Paris in Love	Subject and executive producer	Reality series	21 episodes	
2022	Miley's New Year's Eve Party	Performer	Special		
2022	MTV Movie & TV Awards	Presenter	Special	Category: MTV Reality Royalty Lifetime Achievement	
2023	The Kardashians	Guest star	Reality series	Episode: "A Short-Term Fight"	
2023	Top Model	Guest star	Competitive reality series	Episode dated October 14	
2024	Paris & Nicole: The Encore	Subject and executive producer	Reality miniseries	3 episodes	
2024	iHeartRadio Jingle Ball	Performer	Special		
2024	A Very Demi Holiday Special	Guest star	Special		
2025	MTV Video Music Awards	Presenter	Special	Category: Song of the Year	
2026	FIFA World Cup	Stadium captain	Live sports broadcast	Turkey–United States match at SoFi Stadium on June 25	
2026	House of Stassi	Herself	Reality series	Cameo appearance; episode: "Ghosts of Past, Present & Future"	
2026	MTV Video Music Awards	Presenter	Special	Introduced Bruno Mars	

== Music videos ==
Year	Song	Artist	Director	Ref.
2002	"Honey Bunny"	Vincent Gallo	Vincent Gallo	
2003	"I Believe I Can Fly"	Me First and the Gimme Gimmes	Mike Sloat; Fat Mike	
2004	"Caught Up in the Rapture"	Won-G	—N/a	
2004	"Don't Let The Man Get You Down"	Fatboy Slim	Brian Beletic	
2004	"Just Lose It"	Eminem	Philip G. Atwell	
2006	"Stars Are Blind"	Herself	Chris Applebaum	
2006	"Nothing in This World"	Herself	Scott Speer	
2006	"Jealousy"	Herself	Adria Petty	
2008	"Paris for President"	Herself	Chris Applebaum	
2010	"SuperMartXé VIP" (featuring Nalaya Brown)	Juanjo Martin; Albert Neve	Nano Barea	
2012	"Drunk Text" (featuring Manufactured Superstars)	Herself	Jonathan Lia	
2012	"Nothing"	Kim Jang-hoon	Mr. Kyu	
2013	"Tapout"	Rich Gang; Future	Hannah Lux Davis	
2013	"Good Time" (featuring Lil Wayne)	Herself	Hannah Lux Davis	
2014	"Never Be Alone" (featuring DJ Poet)	Herself	Solmaz Saberi	
2014	"Come Alive"	Herself	Hannah Lux Davis	
2015	"High Off My Love" (featuring Birdman)	Herself	Hannah Lux Davis	
2017	"Senza pagare"	J-Ax; Fedez	Mauro Russo	
2017	"Sorry Not Sorry"	Demi Lovato	Hannah Lux Davis	
2017	"I Don't Want It at All"	Kim Petras	Charlotte Rutherford	
2018	"Lil One"	Young Thug; Birdman	Be El Be	
2018	"I Need You"	Herself	Chris Zylka	
2018	"Flowers"	Gabi DeMartino	Aaron Grasso	
2019	"B.F.A. (Best Friend's Ass)"	Dimitri Vegas & Like Mike; Herself	Charlotte Rutherford	
2019	"Lone Wolves"	Mattn; Herself	J. A. Moreno	
2020	"Malibu" (At Home Edition)	Kim Petras	—N/a	
2020	"Cum"	Brooke Candy; Iggy Azalea	Dejan Jovanovic	
2021	"Heartbeat"	Herself	Etienne Ortega	
2021	"Melting"	Electric Polar Bears; Herself	Stephen Sorace	
2021	"Pickle"	Nervo; Tinie Tempah; Herself	Nervo	
2021	"Do You Like To Party"	TaylorXO; Gigi Gorgeous; Tiffany Namtu	TaylorXO; Sam J. Garfield; Gigi Gorgeous; Tiffany Namtu	
2022	"Substance"	Demi Lovato	Cody Critcheloe	
2023	"Lighter"	Steve Aoki; Herself	Maxx and Madison	
2023	"Hands on Me"	Jason Derulo; Meghan Trainor	Daniel Russell	
2024	"I'm Free" (featuring Rina Sawayama)	Herself	Matthew Daniel Siskin	
2024	"BBA" (featuring Megan Thee Stallion)	Herself	Hannah Lux Davis	
2024	"ADHD"	Herself	Brian Ziff	
2024	"Without Love" (featuring Maria Becerra)	Herself	Brian Ziff	
2025	"Adored"	Herself	Brian Ziff	
2025	"Infinity"	Herself	Brian Ziff	
2026	"Fever Dream"	Alex Warren	Andrew Theodore Balasia	

== Commercials and advertisements ==
Year	Brand	Promoting	Ref.
2000	Samantha Thavasa	Handbags	
2001	Iceberg	Clothing	
2004	T-Mobile US	T-Mobile Sidekick	
2004	Citizen Change	2004 presidential election	
2004–2005	Guess	Clothing	
2004–present	Parlux	Paris Hilton Fragrances	
2005–2026	Carl's Jr.	Fast food	(Note: Between 2005 and 2026, Hilton appeared in four commercials for Carl's Jr.)
2005	Go Yellow	German online directory	
2005	Hollywood Prescription	Lip exfoliating system	
2006	MTV	2006 MTV Video Music Awards	
2007	Prosecco	Rich Prosecco	
2007–2008	Fila	Clothing	
2007–2009	HairTech International Inc.	Hair care products	
2008–2009	Bliss	Jewellery	
2010	Mifal HaPais	Israeli lottery	
2010	Brasil Kirin	Devassa Bem Loura	
2010	Be Magazine	Magazine	
2011	Triton	Clothing	
2012	DeFacto	Clothing	
2012–2015	Century Properties	Azure Urban Resort Residences	
2015	BGO	Online casino	
2016	Lidl	Hair care products	
2017	SodaStream	Home carbonation product	(Note: As part of SodaStream's advertisement campaign for April Fools' Day 2017, "a follow up 'reveal' video to the initial [sketch], housed on the official NanoDrop website, furthers the narrative and explains that a 'slight' error in calculation has caused some hydration problems. Revealing the satire, Hilton explains that, in fact, SodaStream is a great way to achieve healthy hydration without harmful plastic bottle pollution and the inconvenience of lugging heavy bottles of water".)
2017	Retouch Brands	Paris Hilton Handbags	
2018	Yeezy	Clothing	
2019	Philipp Sport	Clothing	
2020	Coach New York	Swinger Bag	
2020	Skims	Skims Velour Collection	
2021	Lanvin	Clothing	
2021	Upside of ADHD	Healthcare and awareness	
2022	UberEats	Food delivery service	
2022–present	Hilton Hotels & Resorts	Vacation accommodation	
2023	NBCUniversal	2024 Summer Olympics	
2023	Klarna	Payments and shopping service	
2023	Taco Bell	Volcano Menu	
2023	Grey Goose	Classic Martini Cocktail	
2023	Marc Jacobs	Stam Bag	
2023	MSCHF•Crocs	Big Yellow Boots	
2024	Living Proof	Perfect Hair Day Dry Shampoo	
2024	WOW Vegas	Social casino	
2024	Tan Luxe	Airbrush 360 Self-Tan Mist	
2024	11:11 Media	"Chasin'" (single from Infinite Icon)	
2024	Sonic	Sonic Iconic Drinks by Paris and Nicole	
2025	Frank's RedHot	Hot sauce	
2025–2026	NYX Professional Makeup	Cosmetic products	
2025–2026	Paul Mitchell	Hair care	
2025–2026	Karl Lagerfeld	Clothing	
2026	Old Navy	Clothing	
2026	Android	Operating system	
2026	Loop Earplugs	Paris Hilton x Loop Engage 2 earplugs	

== Digital ==
Year	Title	Credit	Format	Publisher	Ref.
2006	Paris Hilton's Diamond Quest	Licensor	Mobile video game for Android	Gameloft	
2008	Paris Hilton Responds to McCain	Subject	Video	Funny or Die	
2008	Paris Hilton Gets Presidential with Martin Sheen	Subject	Video	Funny or Die	
2011	Paris Hilton App	Licensor	Mobile app for iPhone and iPod Touch	Velti	
2012	GGN: Snoop Dogg's Double G News Network	Guest star (Note: Episode: "Paris Hilton Drinks Her First 40oz Beer".)	Series	YouTube	
2015	Star Girl: Paris Hilton Collection	Licensor	Virtual goods	Animoca Brands	
2017	SodaStream: NanoDrop by Paris Hilton	Subject	Video	SodaStream	
2017	Love Advent	Subject	Video	Love	
2017	Paris Hilton Breaks Down Her Favorite 2000s Trends	Subject	Video	W Magazine	
2019	Hot Weather	Subject	Video	Semaine	
2019	Beauty Spaces	Subject	Video	Allure	
2019	Go To Bed With Me	Subject	Video	Harper's Bazaar	
2019	Are Dogs Reflections of Their Owners? With Paris Hilton	Subject	Video	Cesar Millan's YouTube channel	
2019	Camp Confessions (Note: Episode: "That's Hot".)	Guest star	Series	BUILD Series	
2020	Queen of Stylez (Note: Episode: "From Tokyo To Paris... Hilton".)	Guest star	Series	Snapchat	
2020	No Filter: Tana Mongeau (Note: Episode: "Tana & Imari's Vegas Trip Goes Scarily Wrong".)	Guest star	Series	MTV; YouTube	
2020	Instant Influencer	Guest judge (Note: Episode: "The Competition Begins".)	Series	YouTube	
2021	Expensive Taste Test	Subject	Video	Cosmopolitan	
2021	The Clothes of Our Lives	Subject	Video	Elle	
2021	Paris World	Creative collaborator	Virtual game	Roblox; The Sandbox	
2021	Planet Paris	Creative collaborator	NFT collection	Nifty Gateway	
2021	The Empowered By Paris	Curator	NFT collection	Sevens Fundation	
2021	YouTube Beauty Festival	Participant	Special	YouTube	
2021	Taste Testers	Guest star (Note: Episode: "Paris Hilton & Brad Taste Berries And Make Jam".)	Series	Bon Appétit	
2021–present	I am Paris	Host and executive producer	Podcast	iHeartRadio	
2022	Can You Punish a Child's Mental Health Problems Away?	Participant	Video	The New York Times	
2022	Paris: Past Lives, New Beginnings	Artist	NFT collection	Origin Protocol	
2022	Rainbow High	Guest star (Note: She provided her voice for four episodes.)	Series	YouTube (Note: The series was additionally made available on Netflix.)	
2022–2023	Trapped in Treatment	Guest star and executive producer (Note: She appeared in the episodes "Behaving Badly" and "My Little Secret".)	Podcast	iHeartRadio	
2023	Paris Hilton Avatars	Creative collaborator	NFT collection	The Sandbox	
2023	10-Minute Stay	Participant	Video	Hilton Hotels & Resorts; TikTok	
2023	Life in Looks	Subject	Video	Vogue	
2023	Parisland	Creative collaborator	Virtual game	The Sandbox	
2023	Slivingland	Creative collaborator	Virtual game	Roblox	
2023	The History of the World's Greatest Nightclubs	Executive producer	Podcast	iHeartRadio	
2023	Snacked	Guest star (Note: Episode: "Paris Hilton Breaks Down Her Favorite Snacks".)	Series	First We Feast	
2023	Amber	Virtual assistant	Interactive AI character	Meta Platforms	
2023	Paris Hilton Avatar Collection	Creative collaborator	Digital fashion wearables	Genies, Inc.	
2023; 2024	Paris Hilton Live	Host	Live streaming session	TalkShopLive; E! Online	
2024	The Provocateur	Subject	Video	Agent Provocateur	
2025	My Friend Daisy	Executive producer	Podcast	iHeartRadio	
2025	Inclusive by Design	Host and executive producer	Series	YouTube	
2025–present	Paris & Pups (Note: The series was additionally made available on Amazon Prime Video and Sky TV.)	Producer	Series	YouTube	
2026	Back in Business	Host and executive producer	Series	YouTube	
2026	Searching for Mr. Deepfakes	Participant and executive producer	Series	TikTok	
2026	30 Celebrities Fight For $1,000,000!	Judge	Video	Mr Beast's YouTube channel	
2026	I Became A Billionaire's Assistant for 24 Hours	Subject	Video	Jordan Matter's YouTube channel	
2026	Iconic Ideas	Designer	Mobile app	Android	
2026	Unboxing the Killer Doll	Voice role and executive producer (Note: She voiced the title character, Little Miss Nobody.)	Microseries	aTwist	

== Discography ==
Studio albums	Details	Ref.
Paris	Released: September 22, 2006; Label: Warner Bros.; Format: CD, LP, digital download, cassette, streaming	
Infinite Icon	Released: September 6, 2024; Label: 11:11 Media; Format: CD, LP, digital download, streaming	

== Bibliography ==
Year	Title	Format	Publisher	ISBN	Ref.
2004	Confessions of an Heiress: A Tongue-in-Chic Peek Behind the Pose	Book (non-fiction, autobiography)	Simon & Schuster	0-7432-6664-1	
2005	Your Heiress Diary: Confess It All to Me	Book (non-fiction, autobiography)	Simon & Schuster	0-7432-8714-2	
2021	The 100 Most Influential People of 2021: Britney Spears	Essay	Time	—N/a	
2021	America's 'Troubled Teen Industry' Needs Reform so Kids Can Avoid the Abuse I Endured	Op-ed	The Washington Post	—N/a	
2022	Paris Hilton Advocates for Federal Law to End Institutional Child Abuse	Op-ed	USA Today	—N/a	
2023	Paris: The Memoir	Book (non-fiction, autobiography)	HarperCollins	0-0632-2462-3	
2024	Why ADHD Is My Superpower	Op-ed	Teen Vogue	—N/a	
2025	Why I'm Not Hiding My ADHD From My Kids	Op-ed	Fortune	—N/a	
2025	Why I Support a California Bill to Stop Institutional Abuse	Op-ed	The Sacramento Bee	—N/a	
2026	The 100 Most Influential People of 2026: Lando Norris	Essay	Time	—N/a	
2026	Paris Hilton is Android's First Icon in Residence	Essay	Google	—N/a	
2026	Don't Let Provo Canyon School Reopen Its Doors	Op-ed	The Salt Lake Tribune	—N/a	

== Magazine covers ==
Year	Magazine	Country	Ref.
1988	Beverly Hills 213	United States	
2002	Tatler	England	
2002	FHM	United States	
2003	Vegas	United States	
2003	FHM	United States	
2003	Seventeen	United States	
2003	Ocean Drive	United States	
2003	TV Guide	United States	
2003	Maxim	England	
2004	Ralph	Australia	
2004	Telépro	Belgium	
2004	Sugar	England	
2004	GQ	Spain	
2004	FHM	Australia	
2004	FHM	United States	
2004	Maxim	United States	
2004	Esquire	United States	
2004	Movieline	United States	
2004	TV Guide	United States	
2004	Elle	United States	
2004	Elle	England	
2005	Ralph	Australia	
2005	Seventeen	United States	
2005	Jane	United States	
2005	Vanity Fair	United States	
2005	Stuff	United States	
2005	Playboy	United States	
2005	RG Vogue	Brazil	
2005	Sugar	England	
2005	Maxim	England	
2005	Tatler	England	
2006	Elle	England	
2006	Vogue Paris	France	
2006	Marie Claire	Australia	
2006	Seventeen	United States	
2006	Out	United States	
2007	People	United States	
2007	Harper's Bazaar	United States	
2007	Harper's Bazaar	Spain	
2007	GQ	Germany	
2007	Elle	England	
2007	Elle	Czech Republic	
2007	Cosmopolitan	Indonesia	
2007	Cosmopolitan	Philippines	
2007	Cosmopolitan	Spain	
2008	Maxim	Germany	
2008	GQ	Russia	
2008	Marie Claire	United States	
2008	Nylon	United States	
2008	944	United States	
2009	Fabulous	England	
2010	Éva	Slovakia	
2010	RG Vogue	Brazil	
2011	Vogue	Turkey	
2011	Daily Variety	United States	
2011	YRB	United States	
2011	Vanity Fair	Spain	
2011	Marie Claire	India	
2011	Mega	Philippines	
2012	FHM	Six countries	(Note: Editions of England, India, Turkey, Malaysia, Indonesia, and South Africa.)
2013	FHSN	United States	
2013	Neo2	Spain	
2013	Marie Claire	Spain	
2013	Marie Claire	Ukraine	
2014	Marie Claire	Mexico	
2014	Remix	New Zealand	
2015	Interview	Germany	
2015	Odda	England	
2015	ADON	United States	
2015	Paper	United States	
2015	Runway	United States	
2015	New You	United States	
2016	BELLA	United States	
2016	Galore	United States	
2017	Galore	United States	
2017	Ocean Drive	United States	
2017	Plastik	Lebanon	
2017	D'scene	International	
2018	Gay Times	England	
2018	Evening Standard	England	
2018	Velvet	United Arab Emirates	
2019	Emirates Woman	United Arab Emirates	
2019	Cosmopolitan	Spain	
2020	Cosmopolitan	England	
2020	Grazia	Italy	
2020	Ladygunn	United States	
2020	The Sunday Times	England	
2020	Rollacoaster	England	
2021	Tatler	England	
2021	Stella	England	
2021	Delish	United States	
2021	L'Officiel	Italy	
2021	L'Officiel	India	
2021	Vogue CS	Czech Republic	
2022	InStyle	Spain	
2022	Modern Luxury	United States	
2022	Guardian Saturday	England	
2022	Mirror Mirror	Netherlands	
2023	The Times	England	
2023	Glamour	England	
2023	Harper's Bazaar	United States	
2023	Us Weekly	United States	
2023	Romper	United States	
2024	Flaunt	United States	
2024	Fashion	United States	
2024	Nylon	United States	
2024	Pop Icon	United States	
2024	Glamour	United States	
2025	Grazia	10 countries	(Note: Editions of the United States, England, Italy, France, Netherlands, Germany, Bulgaria, Singapore, India, and Malaysia.)
2025	Los Angeles	United States	
2025	i-D	England	
2025	Numéro	France	
