= Paris Hilton =

American media personality (born 1981)

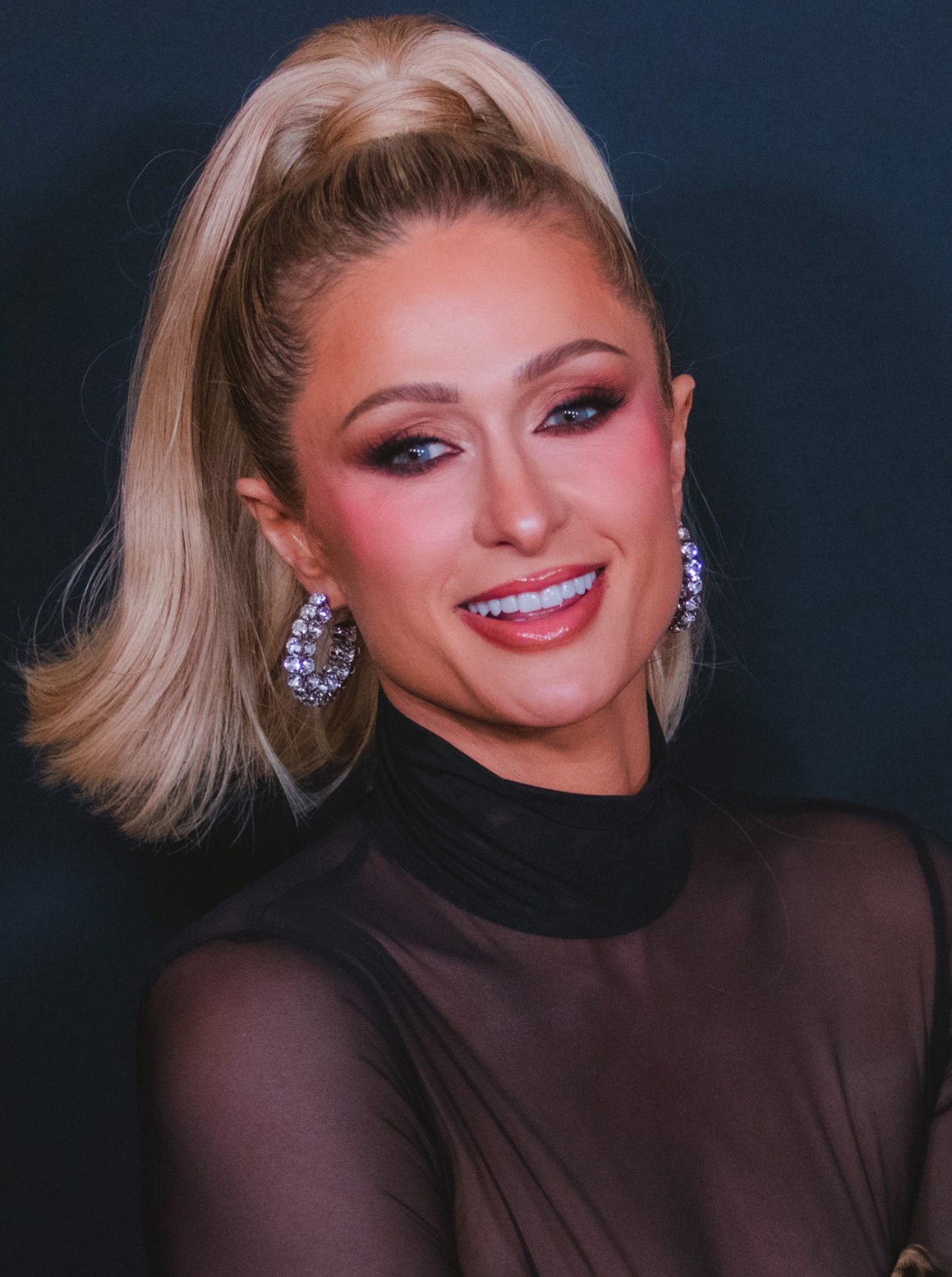
- Hilton in 2026
- Born: Paris Whitney Hilton; February 17, 1981 (age 45); New York City, U.S.
- Occupations: Media personality; entertainer; businesswoman
- Years active: 1996–present
- Works: List
- Spouse: Carter Reum (m. 2021)
- Children: 2
- Parent(s): Richard Hilton; Kathy Hilton
- Family: Hilton
- Musical career
- Instrument: Vocals
- Labels: Warner Bros.; Cash Money
- Website: parishilton.com

Paris Whitney Hilton (born February 17, 1981) is an American media personality, entertainer, and businesswoman. Born in New York City, she is a great-granddaughter of Hilton Hotels founder Conrad Hilton. She first attracted tabloid attention in the late 1990s for her presence in New York City's social scene, ventured into fashion modeling in 2000, and was proclaimed "New York's leading It Girl" in 2001. The reality television series The Simple Life (2003–2007), in which she co-starred with her friend Nicole Richie, and a leaked 2003 sex tape with her then-boyfriend Rick Salomon, later released as 1 Night in Paris (2004), catapulted her to global fame.

Hilton's career in entertainment has encompassed acting, modeling, singing, writing, producing, deejaying, and podcasting. Her star vehicles include Paris, Not France (2008), Paris Hilton's My New BFF (2008–2009), The World According to Paris (2011), The American Meme (2018), This Is Paris (2020), Cooking with Paris (2021), Paris in Love (2021–2023), and Infinite Icon: A Visual Memoir (2026). Under her company, 11:11 Media, she has launched a variety of content and products. Her perfume line alone has brought in over US$2.5 billion in revenue, as of 2020.

A polarizing and ubiquitous public figure, Hilton is said to have influenced the revival of the "famous for being famous" phenomenon throughout the 2000s. Critics indeed suggest that she exemplifies the celebutante—a household name through inherited wealth and lavish lifestyle. Forbes included her in its Celebrity 100 in 2004, 2005, and 2006, and ranked her as the most "overexposed" celebrity in 2006 and 2008.

== Early life ==
Hilton was born on February 17, 1981 in New York City, to Richard Hilton, a businessman, and Kathy Hilton, a socialite and former child actress. Her name comes from a promise that her mother made with La Toya and Michael Jackson when they were younger that if they had a daughter, they would name her after the French capital city. She is the oldest of four children, with one sister, Nicholai "Nicky" Hilton, and two younger brothers, Barron and Conrad Hilton. On their father's side, the four are great-grandchildren of Conrad Hilton, who founded Hilton Hotels, and grandchildren of Barron Hilton. Their maternal aunts are television personalities Kim and Kyle Richards. The siblings have Norwegian, German, Italian, English, Irish, and Scottish ancestry. The family followed the Catholic faith.

Hilton moved frequently in her youth, living in Beverly Hills, the Hamptons, and a suite in the Waldorf-Astoria Hotel in Manhattan. Her relatives have described her as "very much a tomboy" who dreamed about becoming a veterinarian. Her mother recalled her saving money to buy monkeys, snakes, and goats, and once leaving "the snake out the cage [...] at the Waldorf". Hilton was raised in a very "sheltered, conservative" atmosphere; her parents were particularly strict, and she was not allowed to date, wear make-up, or certain types of clothes, or go to school dances. Her mother enrolled her in etiquette classes with the idea of introducing her as a debutante, which Hilton was at first reluctant to do, as she did not find it to be "real" or "natural". She described part of her upbringing as "very proper, very prim, almost like a "Stepford wife". The family's social circle included figures such as Lionel Richie, Donald Trump, and Michael Jackson.

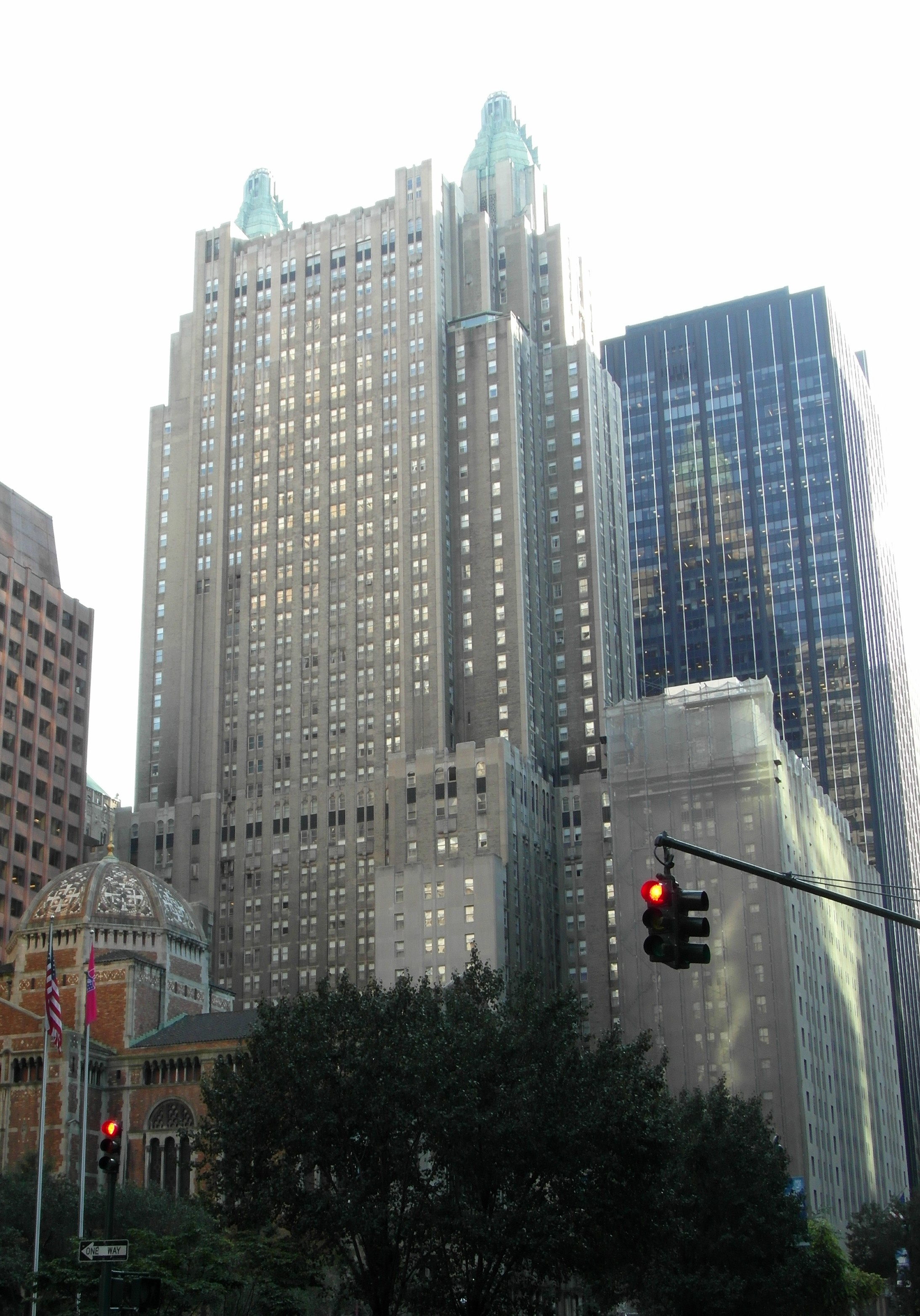
The Waldorf Astoria New York, where Hilton lived her teenage years

Growing up in Los Angeles, Hilton attended the Buckley School and St. Paul the Apostle School, finishing eighth grade in 1995. Her first year of high school (1995–96) was spent at the Marywood-Palm Valley school in Rancho Mirage, California. In 1996, Hilton and her family left California for New York City, and she joined the Dwight School. At 15, she attended classes at Professional Children's School. She skated and played ice hockey at Canterbury, a Connecticut preparatory school. In Paris: The Memoir, she disclosed that she was groomed by an eighth-grade teacher at 14, and drugged and sexually abused by an older man she met at a mall in Los Angeles at 15.

In New York City, Hilton had a rebellious youth, regularly skipping classes and sneaking out to parties. On this period, Kathy remarked: "Let's put it this way—it got very out of control and I was scared for her. And my husband was very scared for her. And, you know, those nightclubs go on all night." Her parents eventually sent her, then 16, to a series of boarding schools for emotionally troubled teens, including Provo Canyon School, where Hilton says that she was mentally, physically, and sexually abused by the staff. In her documentary This Is Paris, Hilton and other former students from Provo Canyon School recall the abuses they faced, including solitary confinement, forced medication, restraint, battery, and strangulation. She attended Provo for 11 months and was released in early 1999, around the time she turned 18. She then attended the Dwight School before dropping out a few months later. "She knew no one at [Dwight]", said her mother in an interview, while a classmate described her as "sort of more sophisticated. She was different from everybody else". She later earned a GED certification.

== Career ==
=== Social scene and modeling (1996–2002) ===
With mother Kathy and sister Nicky, Hilton modeled as a child at charity events, graced the May 4, 1988, cover of the weekly magazine Beverly Hills 213, and made an uncredited appearance in the fantasy film Wishman (1992).

After relocating to NYC in 1996, Hilton developed a reputation as a socialite through appearances at nightclubs and high-profile events. She has recalled getting offers to show up in nightclubs as young as 16, when she obtained a counterfeited identity document to gain access to events. Her antics and late-night persona soon started attracting the spotlight from local tabloids. After becoming familiar with Paris and Nicky's social circle, Jason Binn, publisher of Hamptons magazine, stated: "They're little stars. They've become names. To them, it's like a job. I believe they wake up every morning and say, 'O.K., where am I supposed to be tonight?'."

Hilton at the Palms Casino Resort opening in Las Vegas in 2001

That lifestyle conflicted with her family's conservative background and proved too "rebellious" for the young Paris, whose parents sent her to a series of boarding schools until she turned 18. Hilton resumed public appearances shortly afterwards and attended the NYC premiere of Cruel Intentions in March 1999 with Nicky. A New Yorker profile by Bob Morris, published in October that year, described her and her sister as "the littlest socialites in town [...] Without even a smile, they can breeze past the velvet ropes at Moomba or get a seat at Le Bilboquet". Businessman George J. Maloof Jr., for instance, flew Hilton in his private jet and paid her to attend the Palms Casino Resort opening in Las Vegas in November 2001.

Inspired by designers Patricia Field and Betsey Johnson, Hilton decided to pursue modeling, signing with Donald Trump's agency, T Management, at age 19. She modeled for Catherine Malandrino and Marc Bouwer, and posed alongside Nicky for David LaChapelle in a shoot that was featured in the September 2000 issue of Vanity Fair. On her persona, LaChapelle stated: "Paris had a charisma back then that you couldn't take your eyes off. She would giggle and laugh and be effervescent and take up a room". By 2001, Hilton had become "one of the biggest stars, off and on the catwalk", at New York Fashion Week, graced an advertising campaign for Italian label Iceberg, and appeared on magazines such as Vogue and FHM.

External image
- Hilton's David LaChapelle-photographed Vanity Fair issue from September 2000

In addition to modeling, Hilton ventured into screen acting, playing an ill-fated character in the independent teen thriller Sweetie Pie (2000), and filming a cameo appearance as herself in the comedy Zoolander (2001), with Ben Stiller. In 2002, she appeared in Vincent Gallo's "Honey Bunny" video, played a "strung-out supermodel" in the five-minute short QIK2JDG, and starred as a socialite in the straight-to-DVD horror film Nine Lives.

=== International stardom (2003–2007) ===
In February 2003, Paris and Nicky Hilton signed on to be special correspondents for Entertainment Tonight during New York Fashion Week. Together, they briefly played themselves in the mockumentary film Pauly Shore Is Dead and served as penalists in several episodes of the game show Hollywood Squares. That year, she also made cameo appearances in the films Wonderland and The Cat in the Hat, in an episode of Da Ali G Show, and in the Weekend Update segment during the December 6 episode of Saturday Night Live.

Hilton's breakout came in the Fox reality series The Simple Life, in which she starred with her childhood friend and socialite counterpart Nicole Richie. The show was initially pitched to both Paris and Nicky. Paris was convinced to come on board; however, Nicky, being somewhat shy to the limelight at the time, opted out. The series premiered on December 2, 2003, shortly after the leak of Hilton's sex tape, and was a ratings success. Its first episode attracted 13 million viewers, increasing Fox's adult 18–49 rating by 79 percent. The high viewership was attributed to the exposure Hilton received for the homemade tape, while she became known for her onscreen dumb blonde persona.

By 2004, Hilton had taken on a number of supporting and guest-starring roles in feature films and scripted television series such as Raising Helen and The O.C., signed on to appear in a series of advertisement campaigns for Guess, released an autobiography co-written by Merle Ginsberg, Confessions of an Heiress: A Tongue-in-Chic Peek Behind the Pose, which was seventh on The New York Times Best Seller list, and introduced a lifestyle brand through a purse collection for the Japanese label Samantha Thavasa, a jewelry line sold on Amazon.com, as well as a perfume line in collaboration with Parlux Fragrances. Originally planned for a limited release, high demand for her first fragrance choked supplies but led to increased availability by December 2004. Its introduction was followed by a 47-percent increase in Parlux sales, primarily of the Hilton-branded perfume. After this success, Parlux has released numerous perfumes under her name, including fragrances for men.

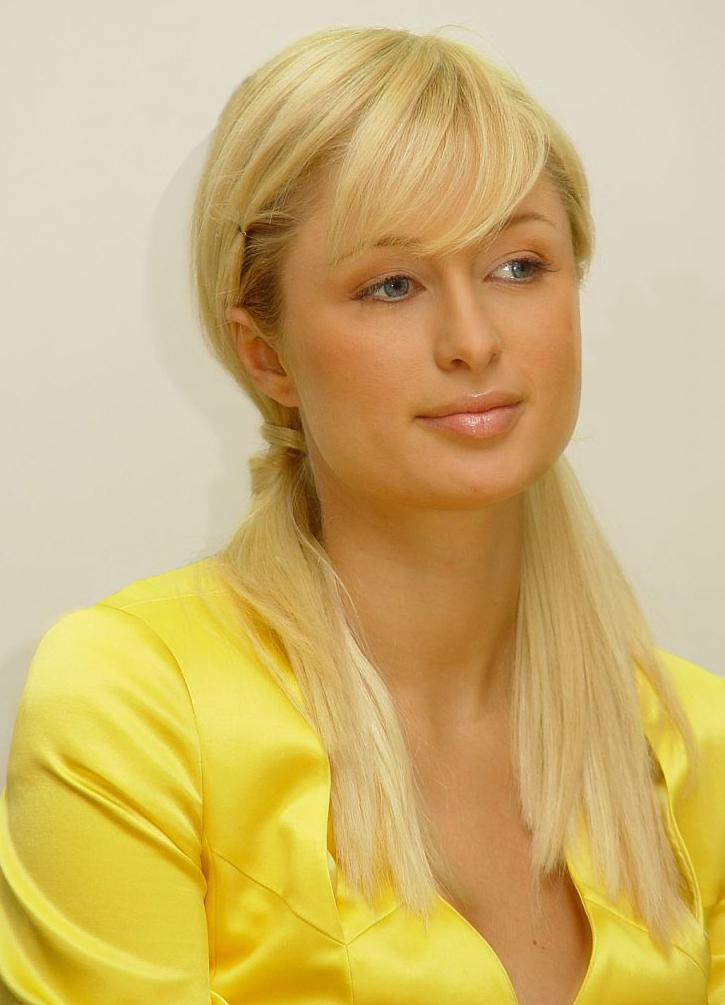
Hilton at a 2005 conference in Munich

In February 2005, Hilton hosted Saturday Night Live, with Keane as the musical guest, and in May, the slasher film House of Wax—her first major film role—was released in theaters, to mixed reviews. Writing for View London, Matthew Turner remarked that Hilton "does better than you might expect", while TV Guide called her "talentless". Her role earned her the Teen Choice Award for Best Scream, the 2005 Razzie for Worst Supporting Actress, and a nomination for Best Frightened Performance at the 2006 MTV Movie Awards. House of Wax grossed over US$70 million worldwide. In May 2005, Carl's Jr. aired a television advertisement, promoting its Spicy Burger product, which featured Hilton in a provocative swimsuit soaping up a Bentley automobile. By November 2005, she had published her second book, Your Heiress Diary: Confess It All to Me.

The Simple Life was canceled by Fox in 2005 after three seasons following a dispute between Hilton and Richie. Neither Richie nor Hilton spoke publicly about their split, although it was speculated that they fell out after Richie showed one of Hilton's homemade sex tapes to a group of their friends. They reconciled in October 2006. After The Simple Life was cancelled, other networks (NBC, The WB, VH1 and MTV) were interested in obtaining the rights for new seasons of the show. On November 28, 2005, E! announced that it had picked up The Simple Life, ordering the production of a fourth season and obtaining the rights to repeat the first three seasons. Shooting for the new season began on February 27, 2006. The fourth-season premiere of the show was a ratings success for its new network.

Hilton released her self-titled debut album, Paris, on August 22, 2006. The album reached number six on the Billboard 200, and sold over 600,000 copies worldwide. Its lead single, "Stars Are Blind", found global success. It was played on more than 125 pop stations in the United States, and reached the top ten in 17 countries. Critical reception was generally mixed, but AllMusic called the album "more fun than anything released by Britney Spears or Jessica Simpson".

In 2006, Hilton top-billed as vain, dumb blonde characters in the comedy films Bottoms Up and National Lampoon's Pledge This!, both of which received DVD releases in North America. Australia's Urban Cinefile described Bottoms Up as a "crass, low-brow comedy" with "little merit" except for "some Paris Hilton curiosity value". She reportedly snubbed the Cannes Film Festival premiere of Pledge This! to protest the addition of several nude scenes, which resulted in a production company suing Hilton, alleging that she did not fulfill her contractual agreement to provide "reasonable promotion and publicity" for the film, despite receiving a US$1 million fee for the role. Hilton licensed her name to Gameloft for their 2006 mobile video game Paris Hilton's Diamond Quest.

The Simple Life finished its run with its fifth season, which debuted on May 28, 2007, and ended on August 5, 2007. That year, Hilton introduced her DreamCatchers line of hair extensions with Hair Tech International, signed a licensing agreement with Antebi for a signature footwear line (Paris Hilton Footwear, featuring stilettos, platforms, flats, wedges and a sports collection), and launched a line of tops, dresses, coats and jeans at the Kitson Boutique in Los Angeles. She also graced the cover of the single Tarantula by The Smashing Pumpkins, posed nude (covered with gold paint) to promote "Rich Prosecco", a canned version of the Italian sparkling wine, traveling to Germany to appear in advertisements for the wine, and modeled for 2 B Free.

=== Screen and business ventures (2008–2011) ===
The romantic comedy film The Hottie and the Nottie (2008), in which Hilton starred, was a critical and commercial failure. Her next film role, as the surgery-addicted daughter of a biotech magnate (played by Paul Sorvino), in the gothic rock horror musical Repo! The Genetic Opera (2008), had a better reception. Despite limited box office returns and mixed reviews, the film achieved cult status and a devoted following. Horror.com described it as "by far Hilton's best role". At the 29th Razzie Awards, she won as Worst Actress for The Hottie and the Nottie and as Worst Supporting Actress for Repo!. She guest-starred in the My Name Is Earl episode "I Won't Die with a Little Help from My Friends" and in the Family Guy episode "I Dream of Jesus". A documentary about Hilton, Paris, Not France, was screened at the 2008 Toronto International Film Festival, and aired on MTV on July 28, 2009.

Hilton co-created, served as an executive producer and hosted Paris Hilton's My New BFF, a competitive reality series about her search for a new best friend, which debuted on MTV on September 30, 2008. The series was a hit and topped all other cable shows in its time slot. That year, she also appeared in two viral Funny or Die videos, Paris Hilton Responds to McCain and Paris Hilton Gets Presidential with Martin Sheen, and, inspired by her love for dogs, created a canine apparel line, Little Lily by Paris Hilton.

As a result of the American version's success, Paris Hilton's British Best Friend debuted on ITV2 in England on January 29, 2009, the second season of Paris Hilton's My New BFF premiered on June 2, and Paris Hilton's Dubai BFF was internationally broadcast on MTV in April 2011. She guest-starred in the fifth episode of Supernatural's fifth season, which aired on October 8, 2009. In 2009, Hilton also released a sunglasses line and a range of hair products that included shampoos, conditioners and vitamins. She won the Female Celebrity Fragrance of the Year Award at the 2009 Fifi Awards.

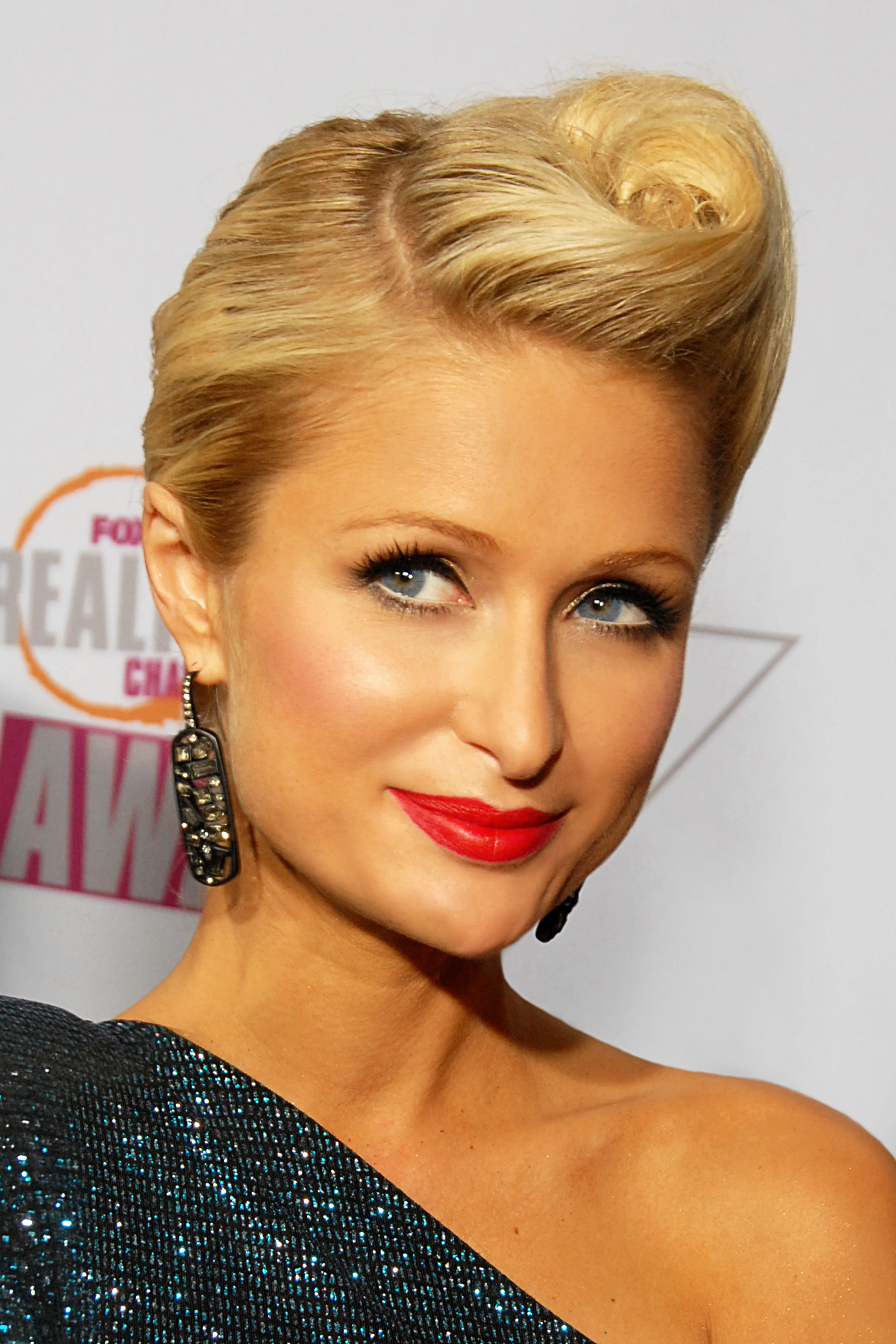
Hilton in 2009

In February 2010, Hilton participated in an advertising campaign for the Brazilian beer Devassa Bem Loura, whose slogan roughly translates into English as "very blonde bitch". As part of the campaign, she rode the brewery's float in the Rio Carnival. The critically acclaimed documentary Teenage Paparazzo, in which Hilton appeared, aired on HBO on September 27. She had her first voice-over role in the ABC made-for-television film The Dog Who Saved Christmas Vacation. The film aired on November 28, 2010 and attracted a respectable 2.611 million viewership. That year, Hilton launched a footwear line in Las Vegas and her motorcycle racing team in Spain. Her driver, Maverick Viñales, won the final race and finished third overall in the 2011 125cc Grand Prix motorcycle racing championship.

On June 1, 2011, Hilton returned to reality television in Oxygen's The World According to Paris. Focused on her daily life, the series bought in lackluster ratings amid a controversial promotional campaign, which was attributed to her then-fading popularity in North America. Alessandra Stanley, for The New York Times, described her as an "attractive woman with proven talent for marketing and self-promotion, though as a reality heroine she seems a little passé [...] it's hard to see how she can recapture the kind of audience she enjoyed in her heyday—even by streaming her premiere live on Facebook".

In 2011, Hilton modeled for Triton during Brazil Fashion Week and for Andre Tan during Ukraine Fashion Week, and continued her endorsement and retail endeavors, introducing a mobile application, which became available for iPhone and iPod touch, and footwear collections in Mexico City and Istanbul. Beginning in 2011, Hilton opened several boutiques selling her products in Egypt, United Arab Emirates, Saudi Arabia, India, Philippines, Malaysia, Peru, Colombia, and Chile.

=== Deejaying (2012–2019) ===
Hilton made her debut as a disc jockey at Brazil's Pop Music Festival on June 28, 2012. It was heavily panned by the public, attracting negative responses from Deadmau5 and Samantha Ronson. In 2012, she received US$1 million to star in a music video for Korean singer Kim Jang-hoon and US$2 million to appear alongside Arda Turan in a commercial for Turkish fashion label DeFacto, modeled for designers Shane and Falguni Peacock at India Fashion Week, and launched a line of sunglasses in Shanghai.

After appearing in the music video for Rich Gang's song "Tapout" (2013), alongside Lil Wayne, Christina Milian and Nicki Minaj, it was announced that Hilton had signed with Cash Money Records. Under the label, she released three standalone singles—"Good Time" (2013), featuring rapper Lil Wayne, "Come Alive" (2014), and High Off My Love" (2015), featuring Birdman—to moderate commercial success. "Good Time" and "High Off My Love" reached the top 20 and top 5 on the US Billboard Dance/Electronic Songs and Dance Club Songs charts, respectively.

During August 2013, Hilton was a DJ at Amnesia's weekly "Foam and Diamonds" parties on Ibiza. The positive reaction from critics and audiences led to her contract's renewal for the subsequent four years. In November, Hilton won the Best Breakthrough DJ award at the NRJ DJ Awards. In 2013, Hilton appeared in four episodes of the Danish version of Paradise Hotel, for which she was paid US$300,000, and briefly played herself in Sofia Coppola's film The Bling Ring. In addition to appearing in the film, she loaned Coppola her house for two weeks of shooting.

In January 2014, Hilton became a resident DJ at Harrah's Atlantic City's "The Pool After Dark". In March, she unveiled her first real estate project, the Paris Beach Club, in collaboration with Century Properties Group, Inc., at the Azure Urban Resort Residences in Parañaque, the Philippines. In July, she made a cameo appearance in another Carl's Jr. commercial, paying homage to the one in which she starred in 2005. To further her career as a DJ, Hilton embarked on a summer and fall tour consisting of 13 shows in Spain, France, Portugal, South Korea, Colombia and New Jersey. By November 2014, Hilton was the highest-paid female DJ and won as Best Female DJ at the NJR DJ Awards. In December, she performed as a DJ at W Hotel's Art Basel parties in Miami.

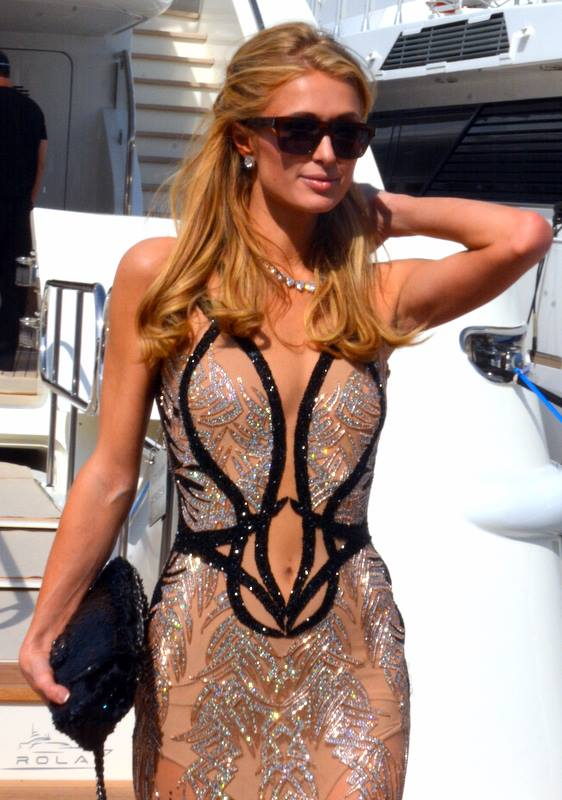
Hilton at the 2016 Cannes Film Festival

In March 2015, Animoca Brands, a mobile game developer from Hong Kong, announced that they had secured a license from Hilton to use her name and likeness to produce mobile games and themes. In June, she performed at Summerfest in Milwaukee in front of 50,000 concert-goers. An online campaign to get her thrown off the bill achieved over 7,000 votes. In 2016, Hilton teamed up with Lidl for a hair care collection.

Between 2017 and 2019, Hilton appeared in the music videos for "Senza Pagare" by Fedez, "Sorry Not Sorry" by Demi Lovato, "I Don't Want It at All" by Kim Petras, "Lil One" by Young Thug and Birdman, and "Flowers" by Gabi DeMartino. During the same period, she frequently served as a runway model for Christian Cowan and The Blonds during New York Fashion Week, and for Philipp Plein during Milan Fashion Week. For April Fools' Day 2017, she starred in a SodaStream's advertisement campaign, promoting NanoDrop, a fictitious sparkling-water product. In June 2017, she launched footwear and home decor lines in Mexico City.

In 2018, Hilton was described as "the centerpiece" of two projects about social media and various personalities' online presence. The documentary The American Meme premiered on Netflix in December 2018, after screening at the Tribeca Film Festival. Rotten Tomatoes gave the film a 93 rating based on 28 reviews. It was written and directed by Bert Marcus, and she was one of the executive producers. She also hosted Hollywood Love Story, a six-episode series that aired on Viceland. That year, Hilton modeled Kanye West's Yeezy Season 6 collection, released "I Need You" as a digital download on Valentine's Day, which peaked at number 32 on the Dance Club Songs Billboard chart, and launched a 70-piece collection with Boohoo.com, her skincare line, a five-nail polishes line with Nail and Bone, as well as a clothing collection in Mexico.

In 2019, Hilton modeled for Philipp Plein's Plein Sport campaign, was a special guest in the twelfth episode of Germany's Next Topmodel's 14th cycle, and collaborated with Belgian production duo Dimitri Vegas & Like Mike on "B.F.A. (Best Friend's Ass)", and with vocalist MATTN on "Lone Wolves". "B.F.A" peaked at number 45 on the Billboard Dance/Electronic Songs chart, and at number 25 on Belgium's Ultratop chart, while "Lone Wolves" peaked at 59 on Ultratop. In July 2019, she performed as a DJ in Tomorrowland. She returned to the festival as a performer in 2022, 2023, and 2026.

=== Resurgence and expansion (2020–2024) ===
This Is Paris (2020), a YouTube Originals documentary directed by Alexandra Dean, focuses on her personal and professional trajectory. In the film, Hilton revealed her experiences with emotional, verbal and physical abuse while attending a series of boarding schools as a teenager. Unprepared to disclose that information, she trusted Dean's approach and found the process of filming to be a healing space for her. She served as a producer but did not have artistic authority over the production. It received over 16 million views in its first month of release and was deemed a successful "rebranding" of her image.

Between 2020 and 2024, Hilton appeared in advertisement campaigns for Skims, Valentino, Lanvin, Uber Eats, Hilton Hotels & Resorts, Klarna, Marc Jacobs, Taco Bell, Grey Goose, NBCUniversal's coverage of the 2024 Summer Olympics, MSCHF–Crocs' Big Yellow Boots, Living Proof, and WOW Vegas. With Klarna, she opened a pop-up store which ran from February 23 to 24, 2023 in Los Angeles.

In 2020, Hilton served as a guest judge in the premiere episode of James Charles's YouTube series Instant Influencer, produced and starred in Ramez Silyan's short film Sorry, modeled at Rihanna's Savage X Fenty Show Vol. 2, and released a merchandise collection, as well as a single with Lodato, "I Blame You". In 2021, Hilton, who founded Paris Hilton Entertainment in 2006, renamed the company 11:11 Media. The company's divisions include London Audio, in partnership with iHeartMedia, Slivington Manor Entertainment, with an overall deal at Warner Bros. Unscripted Television, and 11:11 Beauty, with Guthy-Renker.

Her podcast I am Paris debuted on February 22, 2021, offering personal content and conversations with her family, friends, and other celebrities. It served as the flagship of several programs produced by Hilton's company, London Audio, and iHeartMedia. The other podcasts were Trapped in Treatment (2022–2023), hosted by Caroline Cole and Rebecca Mellinger, History of the World's Greatest Nightclubs (2023), hosted by Ultra Naté, and My Friend Daisy (2025), hosted by Jenn Swann.

Beginning in 2021, Hilton launched several NFT collections, including one with designer Blake Kathryn, which raked in US$1.5 million. She introduced ParisWorld on Roblox in 2021 and on The Sandbox in 2022. On June 8, 2022, it was announced that she had created a fund for the Los Angeles County Museum of Art to support the acquisition of digital art by female artists. She also became an investor in a number of wellness and digital-orientated companies.

Netflix released Cooking with Paris on August 4, 2021. It was a six-part reality series which she hosted and co-produced. It received lukewarm reviews from critics, who considered it a "fun but pointless" production, and briefly entered Netflix's daily Top 10 rankings. Her next reality series, Peacock's Paris in Love (2021–2023), soon followed, premiering on November 11, the day she married Carter Reum. For both Cooking with Paris and Paris in Love, Hilton won the Best Reality Return at the 2022 MTV Movie & TV Awards.

In 2022, Hilton released a tracksuits line, a sunglasses collection with Quay Australia, and a housewares collection on Amazon. She voiced herself in four episodes of the YouTube animated web series Rainbow High, and modeled for Versace at Milan Fashion Week. That year, she performed "Stars Are Blind", alongside Christina Aguilera and Mya, at the Los Angeles Pride festival, as well as with Miley Cyrus and Sia, on NBC's Miley's New Year's Eve Party. On December 30, 2022, Hilton released an updated version of the song, "Stars Are Blind (Paris' Version)", exclusively to Amazon Music, which was followed by another version featuring vocals by Kim Petras on June 2, 2023. She featured in Petras' single "All She Wants", from the album Problématique (2023).

Hilton in 2025

In Alone At Night, a horror film released on January 20, 2023, Hilton played a television host. Her third book, Paris: The Memoir, was published on March 14, 2023, by HarperCollins. She described it as a continuation of "this whole path of self-discovery" that started with her 2020 documentary. It debuted at number three on the New York Times Best Sellers list, in the combined print and e-book nonfiction section, selling 13,640 print copies. By October 2023, the book had sold 46,637 print copies in the United States.

Hilton launched Parisland on The Sandbox in February 2023, and Slivingland on Roblox in August 2023. By February 2024, Slivingland had been visited by over 3.4 million users and reportedly "drove a staggering US$60 million in earned media ad equivalency" on Roblox. In 2023, she held her first concert at The Fonda Theatre in Los Angeles, recorded the single "Hot One", collaborated with Steve Aoki on "Lighter", modeled for Mugler at Paris Fashion Week, and released a cookware collection with Walmart.

Hilton's sophomore album, Infinite Icon, was released under 11:11 Media on September 6, 2024, 18 years after Paris (2006). An electro-infused dance-pop record, it was co-produced by Sia. The album peaked within the top 40 on the US Billboard 200 and the UK Independent Albums Chart. To promote Infinite Icon, she released three singles—"I'm Free" (featuring Rina Sawayama), "Chasin'" (featuring Meghan Trainor), and "BBA" (featuring Megan Thee Stallion)—made an appearance during Trainor's The Timeless Tour at Madison Square Garden, and headlined a concert at the Hollywood Palladium. Sia and Hilton's collaborative single, "Fame Won't Love You", was featured on both Reasonable Woman and Infinite Icon.

Hilton reunited with Nicole Richie for Paris & Nicole: The Encore, a three-episode miniseries released on Peacock on December 12, 2024, in which they attempt to produce an opera performance. That month, she performed renditions of "Turn It Up" and "BBA" at the iHeartRadio Jingle Ball 2024, and made an appearance in Demi Lovato's A Very Demi Holiday Special.

=== Recent works (2025–present) ===
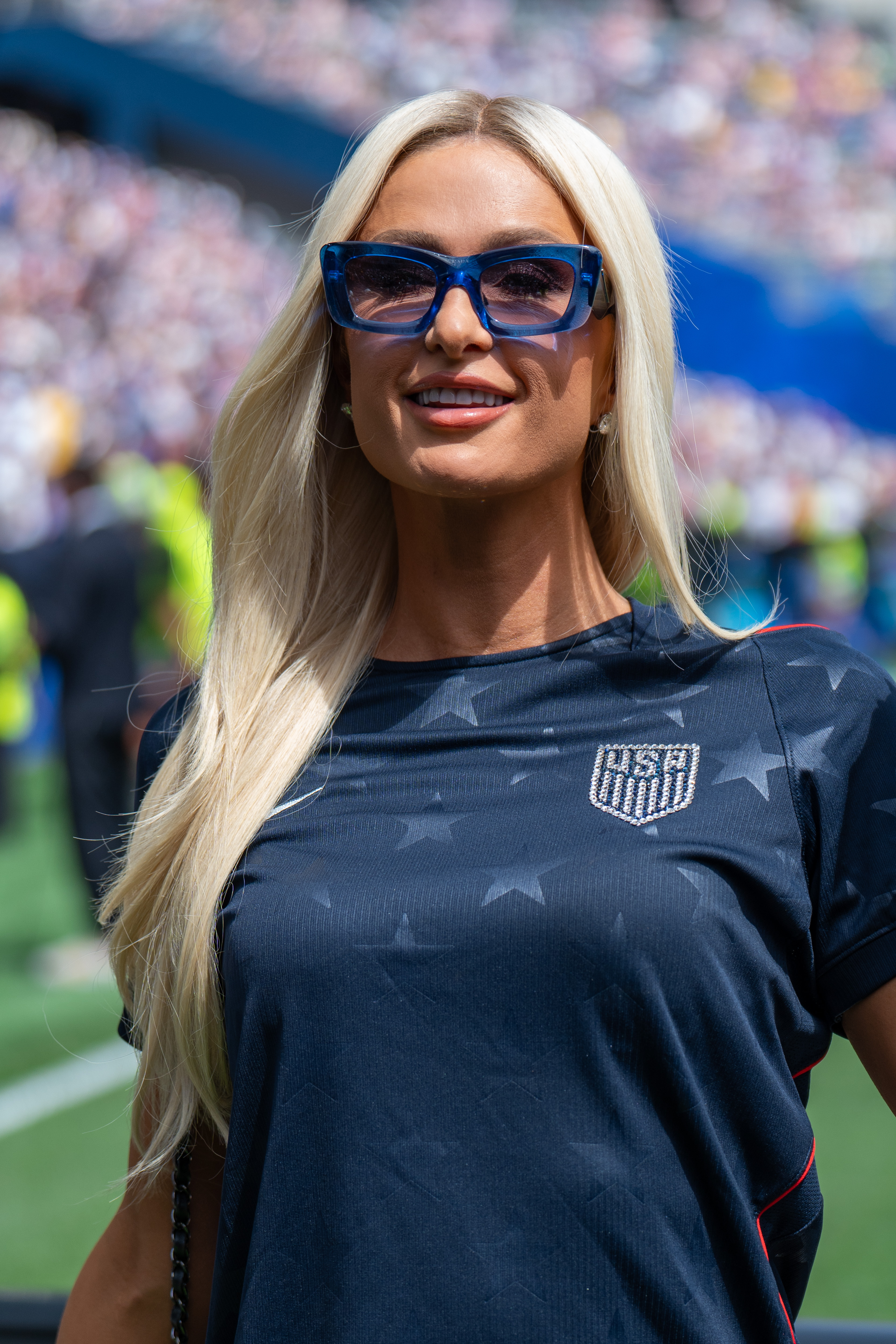
Hilton at the 2026 FIFA World Cup

In 2025, Hilton launched Parivie, a skin care line, and produced three web series—Inclusive by Design, Back in Business and the animated Paris & Pups—that were released on YouTube. That year, she was a spokesperson for the launch of T-Mobile and Baby Three's limited‑edition No Filter Series collection, appearing at T‑Mobile's Times Square store to greet and meet attendees.

Between 2025 and 2026, Hilton served as an ambassador for NYX Professional Makeup, Karl Lagerfeld, and Paul Mitchell, starred in advertisements for Frank's RedHot, Old Navy, and Android, modeled for Gucci and The Blonds at New York Fashion Week, and collaborated with Motorola in the Motorola Razr+ Paris Hilton Edition, with Loop Earplugs in the Paris Hilton x Loop Engage 2 earplugs, and with Betsey Johnson in the Betsey Johnson by Paris Hilton collection.

Hilton served as an executive producer on Infinite Icon: A Visual Memoir, a concert–documentary film released on January 29, 2026 that revolved around her musical ambitions. Paw Patrol: The Dino Movie (2026), in which she voiced a character named Nancy, emerged as her highest-grossing film, with a global gross of over US$150 million. Her other acting work in the year was providing the voice for the title character in the horror comedy microseries Unboxing the Killer Doll, released on aTwist on October 22, 2026. That year, Hilton acted as stadium captain in the Turkey–United States match at the SoFi Stadium during the FIFA World Cup, performed as a singer during Brighton Pride and Pride Amsterdam, and executive produced the documentary film 4000 Days and the TikTok series Searching for Mr. Deepfakes.

== Philanthropy and advocacy ==
As a public figure, Hilton has been a guest at fundraising events, children's hospitals, and orphanages. She has been involved with the Starlight Children's Foundation and the Make-A-Wish Foundation, and is listed on the "First Families" of the Children's Hospital Los Angeles, which means she has donated US$100,000 or more to the hospital. In 2008, a room at the hospital was named in her honor, and for her charitable efforts, Starlight and the American Humane Association have awarded Hilton the 2011 Heart of Gold Award, and the 2014 National Humanitarian Award, respectively.

Hilton supported the LGBT rights organization NOH8 in 2011, raised US$100,000 for children with disabilities in Ibiza in 2015, and donated 50 of her personal items to the Children's Hospital Los Angeles and the Starlight Children's Foundation in 2017.

In October 2018, Hilton hosted Rock The Runway, an event benefitting Children's Miracle Network Hospitals and The Sasha Project LA. 20 percent of the proceeds from her 2018 five-nail polishes line with Nail and Bone goes to Animal Haven, a New York-based non-profit rescue group. In June 2019, Hilton was part of the annual, all-female Cash & Rocket auto rally, which took place across Europe and raised money for Sumbandila, The Helen Bamber Foundation and Dream for Future Africa Foundation.

In January 2026, Hilton volunteered at the Pasadena Humane Society, and held a press conference at the Capitol, with Alexandria Ocasio-Cortez and Laurel Lee, to advocate for the DEFIANCE Act, which would allow victims of AI-generated explicit images to sue creators.

Hilton worked with journalist Laurie Segall on Searching for Mr. Deepfakes, a digital investigative documentary series that identifies the alleged operator of a deepfake pornography website, based on a multi‑year journalistic investigation. This project, released on her TikTok account on May 27, 2026, was accompanied by a dedicated resource hub, BeyondMrDeepfakes.com, created as a pathway for people "who had experienced non-consensual intimate imagery or wanted to learn how to protect themselves". The documentary 4000 Days (2026), which Hilton executive produced, focused on three families' fight for legislative change following the death of their sons from fraternity hazing.

=== Youth treatment reform ===
The release of the documentary This is Paris (2020), in which Hilton spoke about the abuse she endured as a teen in a series of boarding schools such as Provo Canyon School, prompted an increase of interest on #BreakingCodeSilence, a viral movement organized by people who were sent in their youth to a "network of privately owned, powerfully punitive, and often wilderness-based therapy programs, residential treatment centers, therapeutic boarding schools, group homes, boot camps, and faith-based academies". On October 9, 2020, she held a rally outside Provo Canyon School in Utah in protest of alleged abuse and programs for troubled teens.

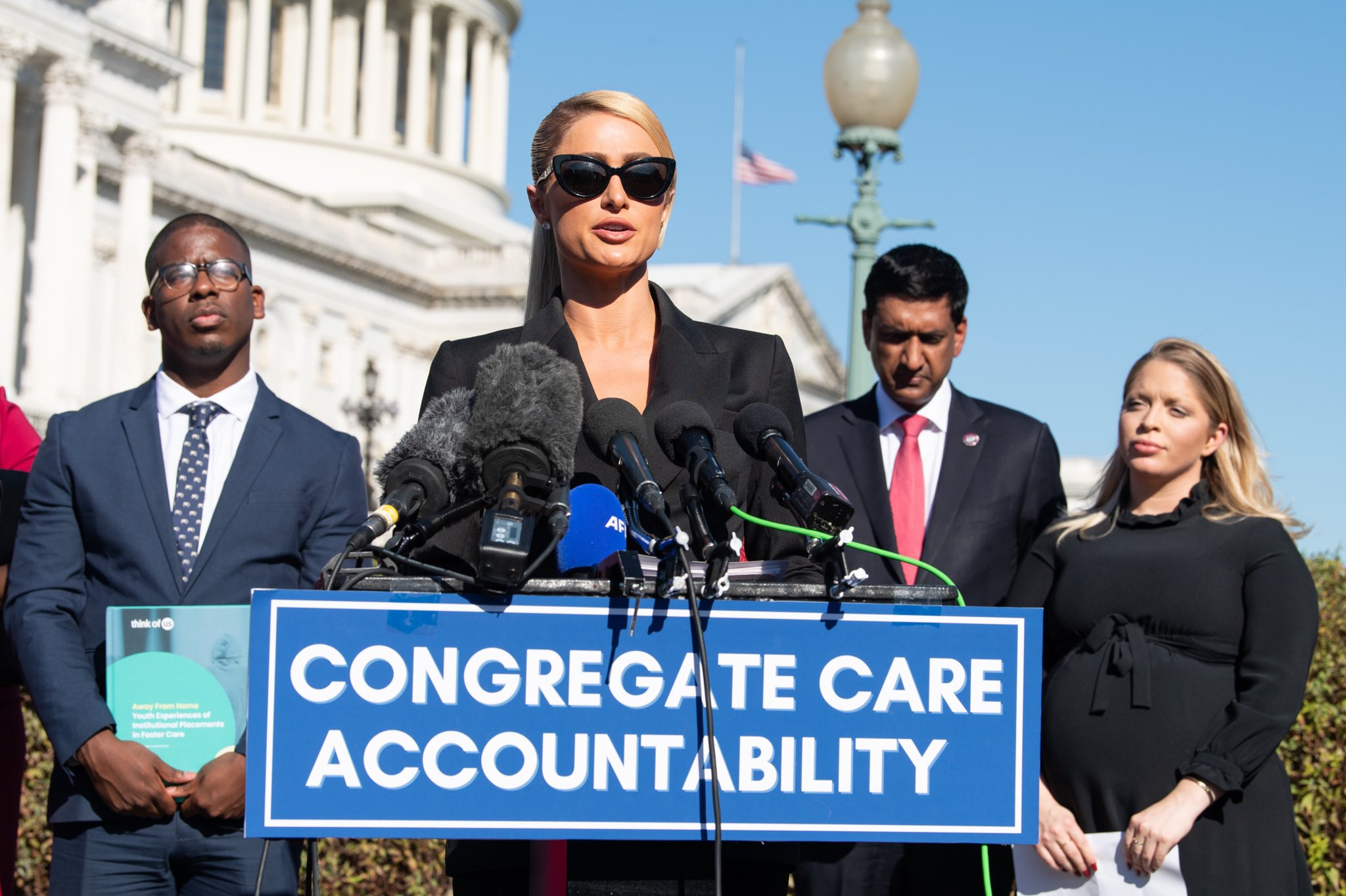
Hilton during a press conference outside the United States Capitol in October 2021

On February 8, 2021, Hilton appeared before the Utah State Legislature to testify on behalf of a proposed measure that would require more government oversight of youth residential treatment centers and require them to document when they use restraints. During her testimony, Hilton said that she had been emotionally and physically abused during her 11-month stay at Provo Canyon School when she was 17. She accused staffers at Provo School of beating her, subjecting her to strip searches, force-feeding her medication, watching her shower, and sending her to solitary confinement without clothes as punishment. On March 2, the Utah Legislature approved the bill, known as SB127. She has supported similar state legislation in California, Missouri, Oregon, West Virginia, and Michigan. In 2026, the Utah Department of Health and Human Services revoked the license of Provo Canyon School following investigations into the treatment and safety of residents.

On October 20, 2021, Hilton held a press conference at the United States Capitol, with lawmakers Ro Khanna and Jeff Merkley, to advocate for the introduction of a bill of rights with protections for children in such facilities. It was named the Stop Institutional Child Abuse Act, and aims to "provide greater oversight and data transparency for institutional youth treatment programs and will help identify and prevent institutional child abuse". The bipartisan bill passed both chambers of Congress during the last months of the 118th United States Congress and was signed into law by President Joe Biden on December 23, 2024. In 2022, she appeared before the United States House Committee on Ways and Means to testify on behalf of measures to improve child welfare in the United States.

=== Humanitarian relief ===
In March 2011, Hilton participated at the American Red Cross run to benefit relief effort in Japan following the Tōhoku earthquake and tsunami, hosted by actor Josh Duhamel in Santa Monica, California. In November 2017, she visited San Gregorio Atlapulco, Mexico, where she handed out food and clothes to the affected families following the Central Mexico earthquake, donated merchandise and a sum of US$350,000 to help rebuild seven homes that were affected. During the COVID-19 pandemic, Hilton performed a DJ set at the virtual music festival #TrillerFest, to drive donations for No Kid Hungry and Music Cares, and a portion of the proceeds from her merchandise collection went to Frontline Foods and local restaurants feeding frontline workers.

Following the 2025 Palisades Fire, Hilton launched an emergency fund through Community Organized Relief Effort and made an initial contribution of US$100,000. It raised over US$800,000 in 72 hours, with US$150,000 being granted to GoFundMe's Wildfire Relief Fund. She created an effort called the Back in Business Recovery Fund, in collaboration with GoFundMe, aimed at helping women-owned small businesses rebuild following the fires. She contributed US$350,000, with a goal to raise over US$1 million. She produced and hosted a six-part YouTube series about the initiative. She also volunteered at Baby2Baby.

=== ADHD ===
Hilton was a featured interview subject in the documentary film The Disruptors (2021). With Understood.org, she partnered for ADHD Awareness Month in October 2024, and co-produced the 2025 web series Inclusive By Design and Paris & Pups. She co-wrote the song "ADHD", included on her second album Infinite Icon (2024), and published op-eds about the condition on Teen Vogue and Fortune. In March 2026, she collaborated with Collegium Pharmaceutical for the "Embrace Your Sparkle" campaign. She hosted the Unstoppable ADHD Creator Summit on October 15, 2026, at her Los Angeles home. The event, supported by Loop Earplugs, Understood.org, and The Mental Health Coalition, was attended by about 200 neurodivergent content creators, mental health advocates, and experts.

== Public image ==
=== Reception ===
A particularly polarizing figure since rising to fame, Hilton has often been the subject of harsh criticism. Writing for The New York Times in 2003, John Leland opined: "In a ravenous celebrity culture, Ms. Hilton's rise shows how far celebrity itself has been devalued".

A 2006 poll conducted by the Associated Press and AOL concluded that Hilton was the second-Worst Celebrity Role Model, behind Britney Spears. According to a June 2007 Gallup poll, nearly two-thirds of Americans (63%) felt very unsympathetic toward her, and a November 2007 online survey of children conducted by E-Poll Market Research ranked her among the most unfriendly celebrities among children. The 2007 Guinness World Records named her the world's "most overrated celebrity", and Forbes ranked her as the most "overexposed" in 2006 and 2008. The latter stated in 2008 that "65% of the U.S. population would use the term 'overexposed' to describe Hilton [...] To put that in perspective, most celebrities average between 3% and 7% on the E-Poll celebrity index during the peak of their careers". In the Forbes list, she also ranked second, fifth and eight in 2007, 2012, and 2014 respectively. A 2011 Ipsos poll concluded that she was the most unpopular celebrity with Americans (with 60 percent of respondents viewing her unfavorably).

Despite the noticeable public disapproval, Hilton was among the most popular searches on various search engines (such as Google, AOL and Lycos) between 2004 and 2008. In 2004, she was named one of the "10 Most Fascinating People", according to Barbara Walters' annual primetime special ("Paris' Most Shocking Moments"). Forbes included her in its Celebrity 100, which ranks the highest-paid celebrities, in 2004, 2005, and 2006. She ranked 59th, 23rd, 34th, and 35th in FHM's 100 Sexiest Women poll in 2004, 2005, 2006, and 2012, respectively, and was 20th and 38th, respectively, on Maxim magazine's Hot 100 list in 2005 and 2006. She has been included among the "50 Most Popular Women on the Web" by Google in 2010, the "100 Hottest Women of All Time" by Men's Health in 2011, the "50 Most Influential People in the NFT Industry" by Fortune in 2021, the "40 Most Powerful Women on Reality TV" by Variety in 2023, and the "100 Most Influential People in AI" by Time in 2026.

=== Persona ===
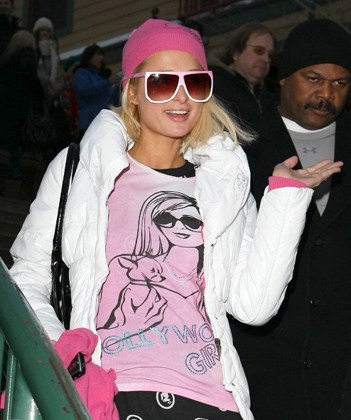
Hilton at the 2008 Sundance Film Festival

The nature and extent of her fame is often questioned by critics, as she is not considered an artist nor performer. Blair Soden of ABC News noted: "She's made a lot of money with a hodgepodge of traditional celebrity revenue. But what she's best at is being Paris Hilton". Writers indeed suggest that Hilton epitomizes the celebutante: a celebrity for no particularly identifiable reason other than inherited wealth and lavish lifestyle. Cait Munro of Refinery29 asserted: "Paris Hilton is an icon not just of the 2000s, but of a certain widely held image of what inherited wealth, undeserved fame, and American excess looks like".

Much of her image has centered on her "party girl-heiress archetype" as well as her blonde hair and the stereotypes associated with it, especially stupidity, naïveté, sexual availability and artificiality. The development of that character stemmed from the initial success of The Simple Life and her desire to embody "the ultimate brand based on [...] the right everything for a formula that far exceeded anybody else at that time", according to Jason Moore, her former manager. He stated: "She was the ultimate package that corporate America would want to make for itself as a marketing tool, but it was already made for them. They say to be a famous person, people want to be you or [sleep with you], and she encompassed both of those".

Fashion and language are two contributing factors to Hilton's star image. Known for her long bleached blonde hair, valley girl accent, and use of blue-colored contact lenses over her naturally brown eyes, she developed her personal aesthetic through mainly pink attire, tracksuits, rhinestones, low-rise jeans, trucker hats, oversized sunglasses, and the "accessory dog". She mimed "high-fashion poses learned from drag queens" and created what was described as the "Paris talk". For instance, she often uses one-liners and a breathy, childish voice in television shows and interviews.

"Throughout the noughties [2000s], Paris became [an example] for girls who were as unapologetically privileged and as spoilt as her; girls who shared the belief that everyone should "stop being jealous". Girls who centred their carefree lives around shopping, sunbathing and partying with their miniscule [sic] accessory-dogs. For everyone else, she was a bit of an eejit. To this day Paris Hilton continues to represent the epitome of naff; she's still striking the same poses, wearing the same glitzy gowns, faffing over her dogs as ferociously as ever [...]"

— Geraldine Carton of Image magazine in 2018

Her dim-witted blonde persona, a carefully crafted act, found significant credence among the general public, which she has described as an obstacle in her career. She once remarked: "People assume before they meet me that I'm a really ditzy dumb blonde. That's the one thing that kind of annoys me sometimes. They just think because of the reality show that's who I really am. But that was just a character that I created. I didn't realize what a huge success [it would be...] With everything that's happening, though, with my business, I think people can understand that you couldn't possibly get this far being a dumb blonde".

=== Catchphrases ===
"That's hot", "loves it" and "sliving" are Hilton's catchphrases. All three are registered as trademarks for products, like clothing apparel, electronic devices, and alcoholic beverages.

On September 6, 2007, Hilton filed an injunction lawsuit against Hallmark Cards Inc., titled Hilton v. Hallmark Cards, in U.S. District Court over the unlawful use of her picture and catchphrase "That's hot" on a greeting card. The card is titled "Paris's First Day as a Waitress" with a photograph of Hilton's face on a cartoon of a waitress serving a plate of food, with a dialogue bubble saying "Don't touch that, it's hot" (which had a registered trademark on February 13, 2007). Hilton's attorney Brent Blakely said that the infringement damages would be based on profits from the greeting cards. Julie O'Dell said that Hallmark used the card as parody, protected under fair use law. The Court of Appeals for the Ninth Circuit reviewed the case and "denied Hallmark's motion to dismiss". Hilton and Hallmark Cards Inc. later settled out of court.

=== Media presence ===
A subject of press and public attention due to her extravagant Hollywood lifestyle, Hilton's media exploits started in the late 1990s, when she became a fixture in NYC's late-night circuit. A combination of what has been described as "vulgar Trump-era exhibitionism and Girls Gone Wild antics" led publications such as Hamptons, The New Yorker, and particularly The New York Post, to often feature Hilton in their social columns. After her pictorial by David LaChapelle and September 2000 article for Vanity Fair, Hilton was hailed as "New York's leading It Girl", whose fame was beginning to "extend beyond the [local] tabloids", by The Guardian in February 2001.

The scandal involving her sex tape, which arose shortly before the December 2003 premiere of The Simple Life, ultimately catapulted her into global fame and made her an overnight subject of media frenzy, paparazzi attention and public scrutiny. The sudden and unusual interest on her life led Entertainment Weekly to write that, "[w]e in the media have become Paris-ites". Similarly, CNN.com described her presence as a "staple of the daily news cycles" that became "impossible to escape". In an effort to "rehabilite her public image" and "capitalise" on the increased curiosity following the release of her sex tape, Hilton started to promote herself through different forms of mass media such as advertising, publishing and broadcasting.

Throughout the 2000s, a decade widely associated with her heyday, Hilton's media ubiquity fed the then-booming online gossip industry and cemented her "It Girl" status. The exposure nurtured an "ambivalent" but symbiotic relationship between Hilton and the press, from which both parties benefited. On different occasions, she has complained about the way she was treated by the media in her twenties, particularly about their narrative on her and constant presence in her proximity, whereas at other times she sought their attention and hand information to reporters herself. Moreover, she regularly planned public occurrences, described as "pseudo-events", with the purpose of being photographed and reported on.

Sheeraz Hasan, who founded Hollywood.TV and briefly served as her media consultant, stated: "I built the foundation of one of the biggest paparazzi companies in the world on the back of Paris Hilton. I had over 100 guys in Los Angeles [...] all of them making a living off" Hilton. Emerging media outlets often received criticism for having a personality cult around figures such as Hilton, but TMZ founder Harvey Levin attributed their coverage on her to how it helped draw a high viewership to the website. Perez Hilton, on his part, purports to have befriended Hilton, who became the source of his stage name and frequent subject of his posts. It has been noted, for example, that he rarely reports on stories or rumors casting her in a negative or unflattering light, and that, unlike most gossip blogs, he often acknowledges and praises her positive achievements. In August 2006, YouTube promoted her eponymous debut album as part of its first targeted advertising launch.

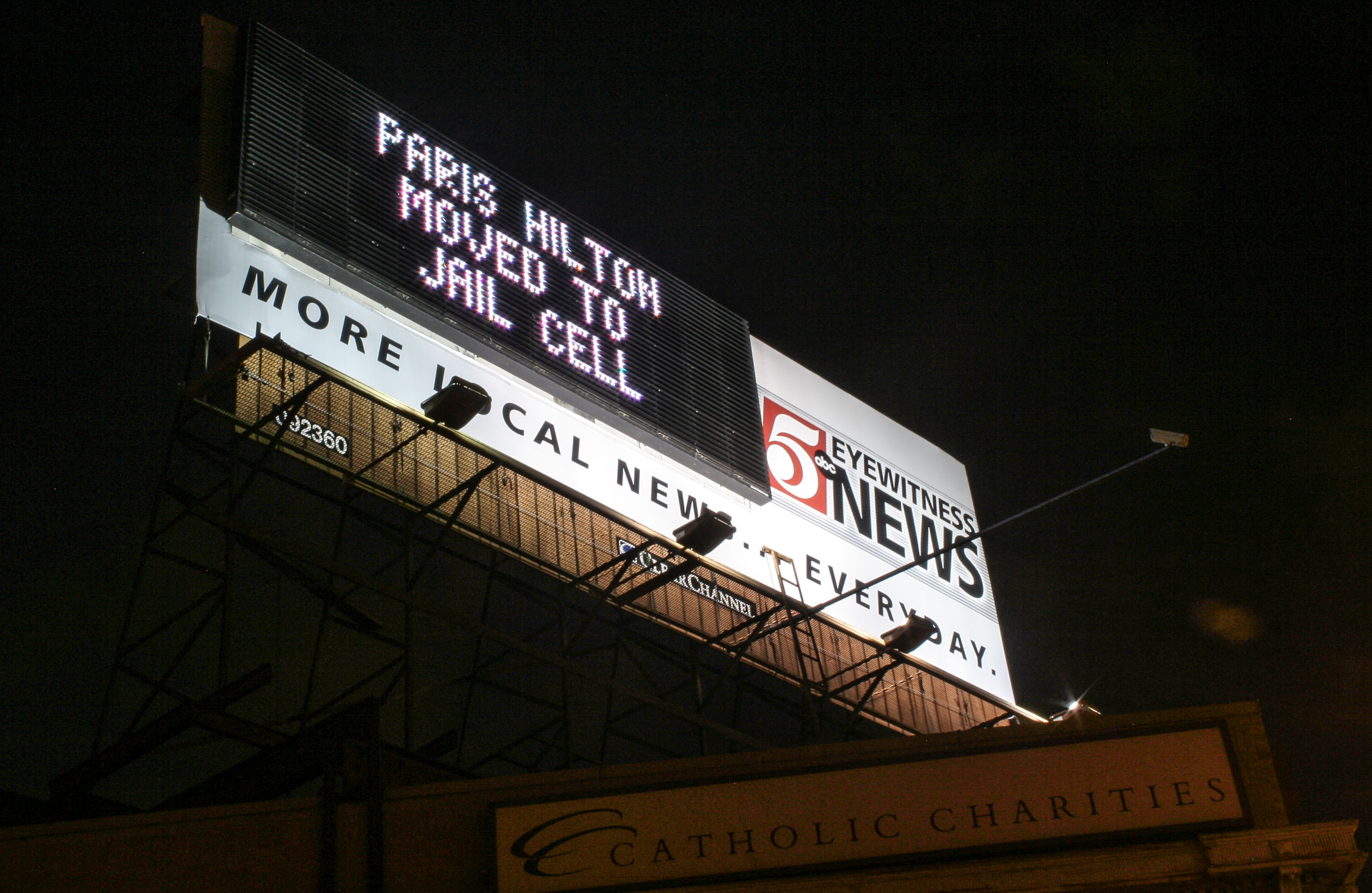
A Minnesota billboard informing about Hilton's prison time in June 2007

The media's over-saturation on Hilton had reached a peak in 2007 amid her much-publicized legal problems. She became the fifth most heavily covered story of the week of June 4 in North America. According to Pew Research Center, roughly a third of Americans (34%) followed news about Hilton very or fairly closely, with public interest in her surpassing that in the 2008 presidential campaign, The G8 summit, and talks between George W. Bush and Vladimir Putin. As a response, the Associated Press attempted to not mention her for the week of February 19, 2007, Mika Brzezinski refused to read a report about Hilton's release from jail on the June 26, 2007, broadcast of Morning Joe, and Us Weekly published its first "100% Paris-Free" issue on June 29, 2007.

Despite the institution of a reporting ban on Hilton, Forbes ranked her as the most "overexposed" celebrity a second time in 2008. A television campaign ad by the 2008 John McCain presidential campaign, in which McCain compared Barack Obama to celebrities such as Hilton and Britney Spears, prompted a direct response from her through a Funny or Die video entitled Paris Hilton Responds to McCain Ad, which was viewed by more than seven million people in two days and received worldwide press coverage as well as written and verbal responses from both campaigns.

By December 2009, Hilton's presence in mass media had reportedly started to wane and become less noteworthy. That month, CNN.com published a story asking, "Why has Paris Hilton disappeared?", in which her absence from daily news circles was attributed to an over-saturated public and a new collective interest on other celebrities. In subsequent years, she remained in the media spotlight, albeit was noted to have "somewhat receded from view".

Hilton developed an online and social media presence and, as of 2021, reached over 60 million users across her social platforms, including Instagram, Twitter, TikTok, Facebook, and YouTube. In March 2012, an experiment conducted by The Next Web concluded that Hilton generated less traffic than actor Charlie Sheen on Twitter, but she has trended on the platform on several occasions. In 2020, according to a Deadline report, there were over 257 million views on videos mentioning her name on social media and her catchphrase "That's Hot" resulted in more than 4.8 billion impressions on TikTok. TikTok videos tagged with her name had collectively received more than 2 billion views, as of 2022. To date, her YouTube channel has accumulated over 400 million views.

Throughout her career, Hilton has graced the covers of numerous international magazines, including US' Ocean Drive, FHM, Maxim, Elle, Nylon, Variety, and Paper; UK's Elle, Es Magazine and Gay Times; France and Turkey's Vogue; Spain's Vanity Fair; and New Zealand's Remix. She interviewed singer Kim Petras for the Summer 2018 issue of Paper as well as rapper Saweetie for the Summer 2021 issue of Wonderland. She wrote a profile on Britney Spears for the 2021 Time 100 listicle.

== Legacy ==
=== Cultural influence ===
It has been said that Hilton's rise to fame, coinciding with society's increased fixation on celebrity and the internet becoming a more accessible medium, facilitated the insurgency of an unprecedented type of celebrity—which was initially promoted by reality television and has since intensified with the posterior growth of social media—whose displays of its private life became an unusual focus of public interest, and therefore, their own source of income.

In 2020, Los Angeles Times' editor Lindzi Scharf regarded Hilton as "the woman who will likely go down in history for putting the 'i' in influencer". GQ's Carrie Battan had previously called her "the figure who set off Hollywood 2.0's Big Bang, the effects of which continue to radiate through the industry today. Hilton, the one who made it possible to be famous for doing nothing, was so sought-after in the [...] 2000s that you couldn't get her to walk to her mailbox without giving her a check". Bert Marcus, the director of the documentary The American Meme (2018), echoed that sentiment, remarking that she "paved the way for creating a brand and a celebrity out of being herself and she turned it into a phenomenon," while Instagram celebrity and entrepreneur The Fat Jew, who was one of the subjects in the aforementioned documentary, credited her for "inventing the way the world thinks about influence".

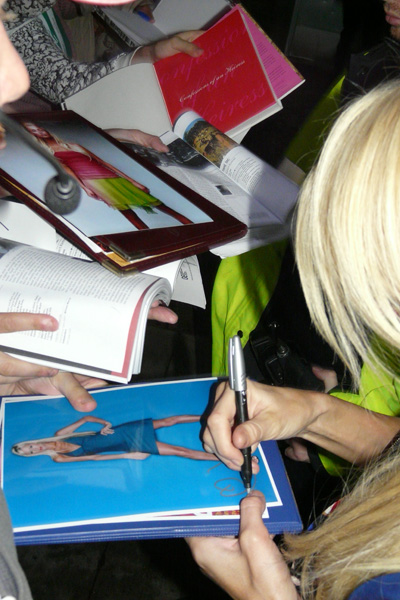
Hilton signing autographs in 2008

Hilton made part of the early-2000s popularization of reality television into mainstream pop culture. Vice, in a 2015 profile, noted that after The Simple Life premiered in 2003, "cable channels began programming reality television shows. MTV's second golden age consisted of The Hills; Andy Cohen reinvented Bravo with a repertoire of The Real Housewives, and TLC started teaching Americans about Dance Moms and Honey Boo Boo". Dazed once considered that every "[reality] star who cashes in after the series by collaborating with brands is essentially selling a sort of post-Hilton aspirational glamour". The Kardashian family, Heidi Montag, Spencer Pratt, Tila Tequila, Danielle Staub, Alexa Chung, Brittny Gastineau, and Snooki are some of the personalities who are said to have followed in her footsteps. Kim Kardashian acknowledged Hilton for "giving" her a career, while Tana Mongeau stated that the media personality "paved the way for me. A girl like me who is literally famous for nothing—Paris Hilton taught us how to make that a business, you know what I mean".

Hilton's influence on fashion, tabloid journalism, and Hollywood throughout the 2000s led her to be considered an American pop culture icon. The height of her fame contributed to the growth of what The New York Times described as a "misogynist" and intrusive celebrity culture, monopolized by tabloids and paparazzi. For instance, a paparazzi photograph of her, at that time, could range from US$8,000 to US$1 million, celebrity-focused newspapers and media agencies (e.g. TMZ and Hollywood.TV) attributed part of their large viewership to their coverage on Hilton, and a network of gossip blogs such as PerezHilton.com emerged after she rose to fame. The clothing style that defined her image in her heyday—oversized sunglasses, tracksuits, rhinestones, low-rise jeans, trucker hats, and "the accessory dog"—became a popular fashion trend and helped popularize brands such as Juicy Couture and Von Dutch. The Julien Macdonald dress Hilton wore for her 21st birthday has been recreated numerous times. She is associated with the "upsurge of popularity" in "accessory dogs", reportedly prompting a 300% increase in Chihuahua registrations with the American Kennel Club between 2004 and 2008.

Hilton has been discussed by journalists and scholars interested in the role of celebrities and their influence through the media. Feminist theorist Camille Paglia described her as a "groundbreaking" figure in Hollywood, while in her book The Bling Ring, an account on the group of thieves who robbed Hilton's house, Nancy Jo Sales positioned her as a "celebrity symbol of how destructive individualism ruled the 2000s". Jej Perfekcyjność, a Polish sociologist and queer activist, created and organised a yearly event known as International Paris Hilton Day, which took place in Warsaw since 2006, on the first Sunday of May. However, the celebration was cancelled in 2010, following a plane crash near Smolensk, and was permanently discontinued in 2013, due to controversial comments made by Hilton the previous year. On August 29, 2006, the mayor of Las Vegas proclaimed the day "Paris Hilton Day" and gave Hilton a key to the city. Her quote, "Dress cute wherever you go; life is too short to blend in", was added to The Oxford Dictionary of Quotations in September 2009.

=== In popular culture ===
Two popular television characters have been loosely based on Hilton's real-life persona: London Tipton from The Suite Life of Zack & Cody (2005–2008) and Caroline Channing in 2 Broke Girls (2011–2017). The massively multiplayer online role-playing game World of Warcraft has featured a character named Haris Pilton, labeled a "socialite", since the release of The Burning Crusade expansion on January 15, 2007. She is the source for the name of the celebrity gossip blog PerezHilton.com.

Hilton has been parodied in the music videos for Pink's "Stupid Girls" (2006), and Falling in Reverse's "I'm Not a Vampire" (2011), the South Park episode "Stupid Spoiled Whore Video Playset" (2004), The Simpsons episode "Homerazzi" (2007), and the films White Chicks (2004), Date Movie (2006), Epic Movie (2007), Meet the Spartans (2008), Not Another Celebrity Movie (2013), and Reality Queen (2020). She reacted to the South Park episode in 2005 by saying, "I haven't seen it, but when people copy you, that's like the most flattering thing, so whatever people can say, I just laugh about it. It doesn't matter to me". She wrote in her 2023 memoir that she felt judged and dismissed by Pink, whom she called a "brilliant" singer.

Hilton has been dramatised in the television film Paparazzi Princess: The Paris Hilton Story (2008), by Amber Hay, who had spoofed her in a viral 2007 YouTube video titled "Paris in Jail", and in the Lifetime biographical drama Britney Ever After (2017), by Jillian Walchuck. In the second, ninth and thirteenth seasons of RuPaul's Drag Race, she was portrayed by Raven, Trinity the Tuck, and Gottmik, respectively. In 2023, A24 picked up the rights to Hilton's memoir, with plans to develop the book as a television series. Dakota and Elle Fanning are attached to co-produce and star in the project.

In 2005, Madame Tussauds unveiled Hilton's wax figure to coincide with the release of House of Wax. In 2006, she became a target of the street artist Banksy, when 500 copies of her album in 48 record shops across the United Kingdom were replaced with his own alternative version. His rework of the album featured remixes produced by himself and Danger Mouse. The track list contained satire song titles such as "Why Am I Famous?", "What Have I Done?" and "What Am I For?". He also changed the cover sleeve and booklet to display pictures of the singer topless. In 2017, she was one of the subjects of an art exhibit called "Nicole Richie's 2007 Memorial Day BBQ", which was unveiled at Brooklyn's THNK 1994 Museum. In The Good Place episode "The Brainy Bunch" (2018), an American-themed restaurant includes a wall art featuring an alternative Mount Rushmore formed by Hilton, David Hasselhoff, Judge Judy, and Hulk Hogan. A parody stage production, The Simple Life and Death, ran at the Pleasance Theatre in London from November 27 to December 7, 2024.

Comedians Breven Angaelica Warren (E! mock television series) and Maya Rudolph (SNL), and television personalities Tyra Banks (The Tyra Banks Show) and Matt Lauer (The Today Show) are among the figures who have spoofed Hilton's public persona. She has also been a subject of other media depictions such as print biographies, documentaries and television specials.

== Personal life ==
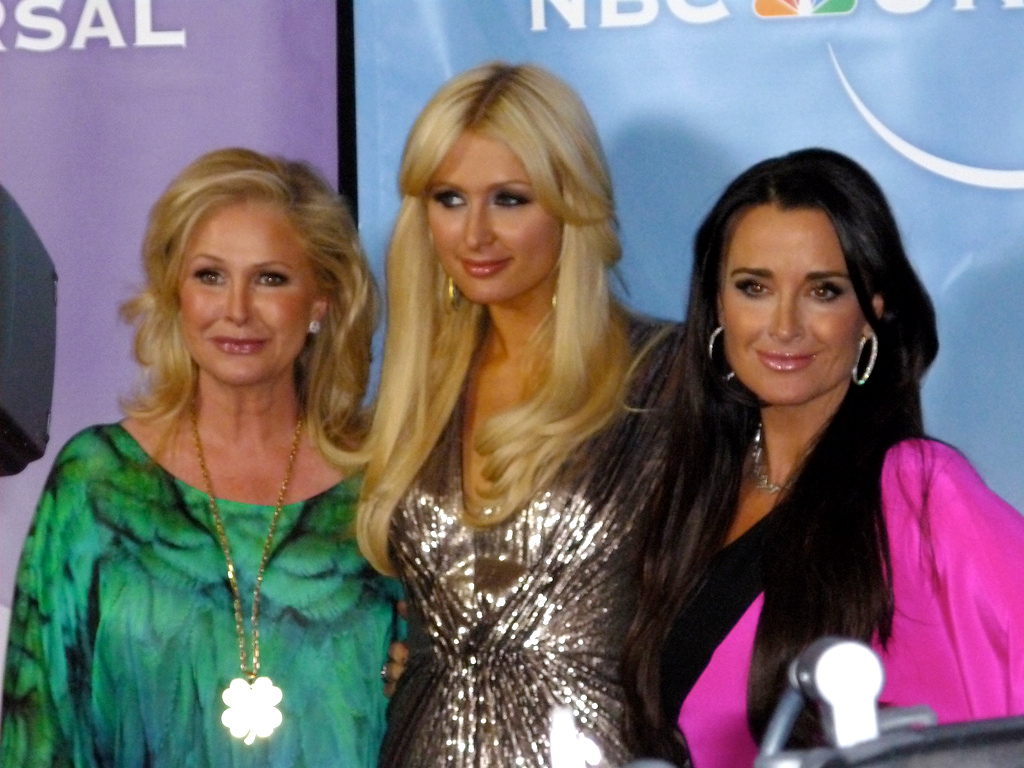
Hilton with her mother Kathy Hilton and aunt Kyle Richards at an NBC event in February 2011

Throughout Hilton's adulthood, numerous aspects of her personal life—particularly, her uninhibited and extravagant jet set lifestyle, her extensive list of friendships, relationships and romantic associations with other high-profile figures, heavy partying, and reported instances of inappropriate behavior—have drawn widespread media attention and public disapproval. She has disclosed having attention deficit hyperactivity disorder (ADHD).

Hilton resides in Beverly Park, and owns a house in Mulholland Estates, and a penthouse in Manhattan. Her oceanfront property in Malibu was destroyed by the Palisades Fire in January 2025.

=== Relationships and family ===
In 2000, a then-19-year-old Hilton drew attention from tabloids when she and Leonardo DiCaprio were seen together on the New York City late-night circuit. That led to one of her first magazine profiles, with Vanity Fair, in which she denied that they were involved. She dated actor Edward Furlong in 2000, and poker player Rick Salomon, with whom she filmed her sex tape, in 2001. From 2002 to 2003, Hilton was romantically involved with fashion model Jason Shaw; she revealed in 2023 that she became pregnant during that relationship, but decided to have an abortion. She had a seven-month partnership with singer Nick Carter in 2004. In his 2013 autobiography, Carter wrote: "Paris was the worst person in the world for me to hook up with. [She] fed my worst impulses as far as partying."

Hilton started dating Greek shipping heir Paris Latsis in December 2004, and they became engaged seven months later. In November 2005, they called the wedding off. She next had a relationship with another Greek heir, Stavros Niarchos, whom she dated on and off between December 2005 and March 2007. Hilton dated Good Charlotte guitarist Benji Madden from February until November 2008. An on-and-off relationship with The Hills star Doug Reinhardt followed, but they broke up definitively in April 2010. She dated Las Vegas nightclub owner Cy Waits between 2010 and 2011, Spanish model River Viiperi between 2012 and 2014, and Austrian businessman Thomas Gross between 2015 and 2016. Actor Chris Zylka proposed to her in January 2018, during a vacation in Aspen, after one year of dating. They called off their engagement in November 2018.

In December 2019, Hilton started a courtship with businessman Carter Reum. After becoming engaged on February 13, 2021, Hilton and Reum were married in Los Angeles on November 11. They have a son and a daughter born via surrogacy in January and November 2023, respectively.

=== Pets ===
Hilton is known for her love of animals, and has owned numerous pets, particularly small dogs such as Chihuahuas. Tinkerbell, her best-known pet, was frequently seen at social events and functions, and in all five seasons of The Simple Life. In August 2004, the dog went missing and was returned a week later after a US$5,000 reward was offered. Tinkerbell died in April 2015 at age 14.

In September 2022, one of Hilton's Chihuahuas went missing, prompting an extensive search that involved pet detectives, drones, and a US$10,000 reward offer. Despite the search efforts, the dog was never recovered. The following year, she had the dog cloned, resulting in two puppies. Another Chihuahua owned by Hilton lived for 23 years; she credited red-light therapy with extending the dog's life. Hilton bought a relative of this dog from a breeder in 2023, a decision that was publicly criticised by PETA, which called it a "speciesist splurge".

In one of her properties, Hilton had a 300-square-foot doghouse with air conditioning, heating, and designer furniture built at an estimated cost of US$325,000. She created Instagram and TikTok accounts for her pets, under the moniker "Hilton Pets", which had collectively accumulated over 150,000 followers, as of 2026.

=== Privacy and safety ===
Sex tape

In 2003, a sex tape featuring Hilton and then-boyfriend Rick Salomon was leaked online shortly before the premiere of The Simple Life. Salomon filed a lawsuit against the company that distributed the tape, and against the Hilton family, whom he accused of tarnishing his reputation by suggesting that he had exploited Hilton. Hilton later sued the company that released the tape, Kahatani Ltd., for US$30 million for violation of privacy and emotional distress.

Under the title 1 Night in Paris, Salomon began distributing the tape himself in April 2004 through the adult film company Red Light District Video. In July 2004, Salomon dropped his lawsuit against the Hilton family after Paris Hilton's privacy lawsuit was thrown out of court. Salomon and Red Light District Video agreed to pay Hilton US$400,000 plus a percentage of the tape's sale profit. In 2013, Hilton claimed she never made money off her sex tape: "[I] never made a dollar. I make enough money in nice ways. My fragrance [line] makes enough, I don't need to worry about that."

Bling Ring

Between 2008 and 2009, Hilton's house was burgled several times by the Bling Ring, a group of fashion-motivated thieves. She was the group's first and main celebrity target, with a majority of the stolen property belonging to her. They reportedly burgled Hilton's residence seven times. It was not until nearly US$2 million were stolen in jewellery, clothing, cash, and other items from Hilton that she made a report. She allowed Sofia Coppola to shoot some scenes for The Bling Ring (2013) at her house.

Leaks and hacks

On February 20, 2005, private data from Hilton's T-Mobile Sidekick—including photos, phone numbers, e‑mails, and voicemail access—was posted online. A 17-year old juvenile in Massachusetts pleaded guilty and was sentenced to 11 months of detention.

On January 22, 2007, Hilton's private life became public on ParisExposed.com, a website with images of personal documents, video and other material allegedly obtained when the contents of a storage locker rented by Hilton were auctioned in lieu of a US$208 payment. The website, which charged for online access to the material, had 1.2 million visitors in just over 40 hours. Among its contents were medications, diaries, photographs, contracts, love letters and a video shot by Joe Francis of Girls Gone Wild, in which Hilton repeats racist and homophobic slurs. Hilton obtained a temporary injunction against ParisExposed.com which shut down the website.

On September 20, 2012, an audio of what was perceived as homophobic comments made by Hilton leaked online. Following the public backlash, she issued an apology through GLAAD. In June 2024, Hilton's TikTok account was "targeted" but "not compromised" in a cyber-attack.

Stalking

In August 2010, Nathan Lee Parada was arrested after security guards spotted him wielding two knives outside Hilton's house. He was found guilty on one felony count of attempted first-degree residential burglary and was sentenced to two years in state prison. In October 2010, James Rainford bicycled past guards at the entrance to her gated community, went to her house, and began pounding on her door. He was arrested and received three years' probation, along with a restraining order from Hilton. In April 2011, Rainford was arrested a second time for attacking her boyfriend Cy Waits outside Van Nuys Superior Court, where Hilton was headed to testify against Nathan Lee Parada, and he was arrested again in July outside a Malibu, California beach house she was renting. He was charged with two felony stalking counts and three misdemeanor counts of disobeying a court order, but a judge found him to be "mentally incompetent to stand trial" and he was sent to a state mental hospital.

Between 2013 and 2015, an "obsessed fan" repeatedly attempted to contact Hilton, by flying a plane over Malibu displaying proposal banners, and posing as a flower deliveryman to gain access to her gated community, where he left her a classic Cadillac. In February 2014, a German citizen, who was completely covered with tattoos of Hilton and appeared to be "extremely drunk", was arrested after he reportedly went to her house "to see her". In December 2014, Hilton filed a report with the Los Angeles Police Department after receiving anti-Semitic messages and death threats on social media from a man who believed she was Jewish.

Between 2015 and 2017, Hilton was the target of an identity theft scheme by Paytsar Bkhchadzhyan, who used Hilton's credit cards to book a party at the Hollywood Roosevelt Hotel worth around US$53,000, pretended to be her in emails to her employees, convincing them to transfer US$106,000 to her account, and hacked her sister Nicky and father Rick Hilton in an attempt to gain passwords to various other accounts. She also stole nude photos of Hilton from her iCloud account. Bkhchadzhyan was arrested in 2017 for bank fraud conspiracy, and was later sentenced to 57 months in prison and ordered to pay restitution.

=== Legal issues ===
On September 7, 2006, Hilton was arrested by the Los Angeles Police Department (LAPD) and charged with driving under the influence of alcohol, with a blood alcohol content of 0.08%. In November 2006, Hilton's driver's license was suspended, and on January 22, 2007, she pleaded no contest to a reckless driving charge. Her sentence was 36 months of probation and fines totaling about US$1,500. On February 27, 2007, she was stopped for driving with a suspended license, and she signed an agreement that she was not permitted to drive. The next month, she was caught driving 70 mph in a 35 mph zone without headlights at night with a suspended license. Prosecutors in the office of the Los Angeles City Attorney charged that these infractions and her failure to enroll in a court-ordered alcohol-education program violated her probation. On May 4, 2007, Hilton was sentenced by Judge Michael T. Sauer to 45 days in jail for the probation violation. She planned to appeal the sentence, supporting an online petition asking California governor Arnold Schwarzenegger for a pardon. Hilton changed lawyers and dropped her plans to appeal.

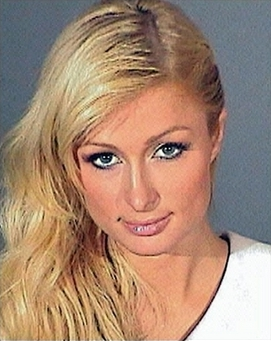
Hilton in her 2007 mug shot

Hilton was required to begin her jail term on June 5, 2007, and entered the Century Regional Detention Facility (a women's prison in Lynwood, California) after attending the 2007 MTV Movie Awards on June 3, 2007. On June 7, 2007, Los Angeles County Sheriff, Lee Baca signed an order resentencing Hilton to 40 days of home confinement with an electronic monitoring device due to an unspecified medical condition. Judge Michael Sauer summoned her to reappear in court the following morning (June 8), since her original sentence specified imprisonment: "No work furlough. No work release. No electronic monitoring." At the hearing, Sauer declined a briefing in chambers by Hilton's attorney on her medical condition and sent her back to jail to serve the original 45-day sentence. When she heard the decision, Hilton shouted "It's not right!". Screaming, she asked to hug her mother. Hilton was moved to the medical wing of the Twin Towers Correctional Facility in Los Angeles, and returned to the Century Regional Detention Facility in Lynwood on June 13. Hilton was released from jail on Tuesday, June 26, 2007. She was interviewed by talk-show host Larry King on June 28, 2007.

On July 2, 2010, Hilton was accused of smoking marijuana at the 2010 FIFA World Cup game between Brazil and the Netherlands. Although she was escorted from the Nelson Mandela Bay Stadium by local police, the case was later dismissed. Her publicist, Dawn Miller, said: "I can confirm that the incident was a complete misunderstanding and it was actually another person in the group who did it". Two weeks later, Hilton was detained and released after she was caught with cannabis at Corsica's Figari Sud-Corse Airport.

On August 27, 2010, Hilton was arrested by the Las Vegas Metropolitan Police Department on suspicion of cocaine possession in Las Vegas and her boyfriend, Cy Waits, was charged with driving under the influence. Hilton and Waits were booked into the Clark County jail, where Hilton was kept handcuffed on a booking room bench, fingerprinted, photographed and released on her own recognizance. Hilton's defense initially claimed that the handbag (containing 0.8 g of cocaine) was not hers. She later claimed personal items (including cash and credit cards) from the bag, acknowledging that it was hers. To avoid a felony conviction, Hilton pleaded guilty to two misdemeanors on September 17, 2010. Under the terms of the plea bargain she was sentenced to one year of probation, 200 hours of community service, a US$2,000 fine and the completion of a drug-abuse treatment program on September 20.

On September 21, 2010, on their way to a Tokyo press conference to promote fashion and fragrance lines, Hilton and her sister Nicky were stopped by immigration officers at Narita Airport because of Hilton's drug-possession conviction the previous day. Under Japan's strict drug laws, travelers convicted of a drug crime are usually denied entry into the country. Airport officials questioned Hilton "for hours", and she and Nicky were detained overnight at the airport hotel. On September 22, Japanese authorities denied Hilton entry, and she was deported back to the United States. Other stops on their Asian promotional tour were canceled due to Indonesia and Malaysia's anti-drug laws.

=== Wealth ===
According to Forbes, Hilton earned about US$2 million between 2003 and 2004, US$6.5 million between 2004 and 2005, US$7 million between 2005 and 2006, and US$8 million between 2008 and 2009. By 2011, CNN.com reported Hilton's annual earnings to be over US$10 million.

In December 2007, Hilton's grandfather Barron Hilton pledged 97 percent of his estate (the Hilton family fortune) to a charitable organization founded by her great-grandfather Conrad Hilton: the Conrad N. Hilton Foundation. As a result, his grandchildren's inheritance was reduced. An immediate pledge of US$1.2 billion (proceeds from the sale of Hilton Hotels Corporation) was made, with a further US$1.1 billion due after his death. Barron cited the actions of his father, Conrad Hilton, as the motivation for his pledge. Conrad had also left the majority of his estate to the foundation, and Barron contested his father's will to regain a sizable amount of Hilton company stock in a settlement.

Hilton's real estate holdings are valued at over US$70 million. Her primary residence in Beverly Park was purchased for US$63 million in 2025. Much of her wealth comes from her business endeavours and endorsements, with estimated product sales of over US$4 billion. Her company, 11:11 Media, is valued at over US$1 billion, as of 2025. Her regular fees for both DJing and personal appearances in parties and events have been reported to be between US$250,000 and US$1 million. In 2009, for instance, Hilton, 50 Cent and Lenny Kravitz received US$4 million for the 51st-birthday party of Ed Hardy founder Christian Audigier, and in 2014, she earned US$2.7 million for four nights' work—US$347,000 an hour—as part of her two-month residence in Ibiza.

== Works ==
Filmography

- The Simple Life (2003–2007)
- House of Wax (2005)
- National Lampoon's Pledge This! (2006)
- Repo! The Genetic Opera (2008)
- Paris, Not France (2008)
- Paris Hilton's My New BFF (2008–2009)
- Teenage Paparazzo (2010)
- The Dog Who Saved Christmas Vacation (2010)
- The World According to Paris (2011)
- The American Meme (2018)
- Hollywood Love Story (2018)
- This Is Paris (2020)
- Cooking with Paris (2021)
- Paris in Love (2021–2023)
- Paris & Nicole: The Encore (2024)
- Infinite Icon: A Visual Memoir (2026)
- Paw Patrol: The Dino Movie (2026)

Discography

- Paris (2006)
- Infinite Icon (2024)

Bibliography

- Confessions of an Heiress: A Tongue-in-Chic Peek Behind the Pose; ISBN 0-7432-6664-1 (2004)
- Your Heiress Diary: Confess It All to Me; ISBN 0-7432-8714-2 (2005)
- Paris:The Memoir; ISBN 0-0632-2462-3 (2023)

== Awards and nominations ==
Year	Association	Category	Work	Result	Ref.
2004	Teen Choice Awards	Choice Reality Television Star – Female	The Simple Life	Nominated	
2004	Teen Choice Awards	Choice Television Personality – Female	—N/a	Nominated	
2004	DanceStar USA Awards	Celebrity DJ of the Year	—N/a	Won	
2005	Teen Choice Awards	Choice Movie Scream Scene	House of Wax	Won	
2005	Teen Choice Awards	Choice Movie Breakout Performance – Female	House of Wax	Nominated	
2005	Teen Choice Awards	Choice Television Personality – Female	—N/a	Nominated	
2005	Teen Choice Awards	Choice Crossover Artist	—N/a	Nominated	
2006	Golden Raspberry Awards	Most Tiresome Tabloid Targets	—N/a	Nominated	
2006	Golden Raspberry Awards	Worst Supporting Actress	House of Wax	Won	
2006	MTV Movie Awards	Best Frightened Performance	House of Wax	Nominated	
2006	Teen Choice Awards	Choice Reality Television Star – Female	The Simple Life	Nominated	
2007	Teen Choice Awards	Choice Reality Television Star – Female	The Simple Life	Nominated	
2007	Teen Choice Awards	Choice OMG! Moment	—N/a	Nominated	
2008	Harvard Lampoon	Woman of the Year	—N/a	Won	
2009	FiFi Awards	Female Celebrity Fragrance of the Year	—N/a	Won	
2009	Fox Reality Awards	Innovator of the Year Award	—N/a	Won	
2009	Teen Choice Awards	Choice Reality Television Star – Female	Paris Hilton's My New BFF	Nominated	
2009	Teen Choice Awards	Choice Summer Television Star – Female	Paris Hilton's My New BFF	Nominated	
2009	Golden Raspberry Awards	Worst Actress	The Hottie and the Nottie	Won	
2009	Golden Raspberry Awards	Worst Screen Couple (shared with Christine Lakin and Joel David Moore)	The Hottie and the Nottie	Won	
2009	Golden Raspberry Awards	Worst Supporting Actress	Repo! The Genetic Opera	Won	
2010	Golden Raspberry Awards	Worst Actress of the Decade	Various roles	Won	
2011	Starlight Children's Foundation	Heart of Gold Award	—N/a	Won	
2013	NRJ DJ Awards	Best Breakthrough DJ	—N/a	Won	
2014	NRJ DJ Awards	Best Female DJ	—N/a	Won	
2014	American Humane Association	National Humanitarian Award	—N/a	Won	
2017	Hollywood Beauty Awards	Fragrance of the Year	Gold Rush	Won	
2021	Footwear News Achievement Awards	Icon Award (shared with Kathy and Nicky Hilton)	—N/a	Won	
2022	Daily Front Row Awards	Fashion Entrepreneur Award	—N/a	Won	
2022	MTV Movie & TV Awards	Best Reality Return	Cooking with Paris; Paris in Love	Won	
2025	TikTok Awards	Muse of the Year	—N/a	Won	

Preceded by David Spade and Justin Timberlake	Teen Choice Awards host 2004 (with Nicole Richie)	Succeeded by Hilary Duff and Rob Schneider
