= Infinite Icon =

- Standard cover

Studio album by Paris Hilton
- Released: September 6, 2024
- Studio: The Ribcage (Los Angeles); Henson (Los Angeles)
- Genre: Dance-pop; electro
- Length: 34:59
- Label: 11:11 Media
- Producer: Banx & Ranx; Dallas Caton; House of Wolf; Greg Kurstin; Kid Harpoon; Naliya; Jesse Shatkin; Ludvig Söderberg; Justin Trainor

Paris Hilton chronology
Paris (2006)	Infinite Icon (2024)

Singles from Infinite Icon
- 1. "I'm Free" Released: June 21, 2024; 2. "Chasin'" Released: July 26, 2024; 3. "BBA" Released: September 6, 2024

Infinite Icon is the second studio album by American media personality and singer Paris Hilton. It was released on September 6, 2024, through her production company 11:11 Media, in partnership with ADA. Sia served as one of the album's executive producers. Released 18 years after her debut album, Paris (2006), Infinite Icon is an electro-infused dance-pop record.

== Background and recording ==
Following the release of her debut album, Hilton had occasionally expressed an interest in recording a second album. She instead released a series of standalone singles through Cash Money Records and her own Heiress Records, a sub-label of Warner Bros. Records, and was featured in a number of other artists' songs.

After performing a rendition of "Stars Are Blind" with Sia and Miley Cyrus on NBC's Miley’s New Year's Eve Party special in December 2022, Sia encouraged Hilton to record a pop album and suggested having sessions at her house. Hilton remarked that the singer "literally brought out something in me that I didn't even know I had. Before I was more in the baby voice and being very breathy and kind of like, Marilyn [Monroe] vibes. And then with this album, I just felt like a woman." Part of the project was recorded at Sia and Hilton's home studios in Los Angeles.

In an interview by Pride.com, Hilton said the album is "just for [the gays]". She worked with producer Benny Blanco and considered songs shared with her by Miley Cyrus and Meghan Trainor.

== Music and lyrics ==
Infinite Icon incorporates different types of house music with pop music in each of its first three singles. The lead single, "I'm Free" incorporates French house with synth-pop and nu-disco, "Chasin'" blends tropical house with pop music, and "BBA" is an electroclash song that infuses big room with dance-pop. Other songs include "Without Love", which is a dance track with electronic pop beats similar to hyperpop and also incorporates house music elements.

Lyrically, Infinite Icon is primarily influenced by Hilton's longtime love of dance music and career as a disc jockey. She stated that performing "all around the world at music festivals, for thousands of people and being on stage and just really paying attention to what makes people move and how to create those unforgettable dancefloor moments —I wanted to bring that same energy into the album." The album also contains songs that traverse more nuanced topics such as her ADHD diagnosis, negative relationship experiences, the emptiness of fame, and her marriage and family life.

== Release and promotion ==
=== Singles ===
On June 13, 2024, Hilton announced "I'm Free" as the album's first single, featuring Japanese-English singer Rina Sawayama, via Instagram, showing a conversation between the singers. The song was released on June 21. It was followed by two more singles —"Chasin'" (featuring Meghan Trainor) and "BBA" (featuring Megan Thee Stallion)— released on July 26 and September 6, respectively.

=== Marketing ===
On July 26, 2024, 11:11 Media displayed a number of billboards across Los Angeles, in support of "Chasin'", in which Hilton instructs people to dial a hotline over relationship issues. On September 6, PacSun, in collaboration with 11:11 Media, released a limited-edition merchandise collection promoting Infinite Icon. From October 4 to November 1, Hilton Hotels debuted two Infinite Icon-inspired suites, custom-curated by Hilton, at the Beverly Hilton in Los Angeles.

=== Media and live appearances ===
Hilton mentioned that she was recording an album produced by Sia on The Tonight Show Starring Jimmy Fallon in October 2023, and officially announced its title and release date in May 2024.

Hilton performed "I'm Free" live in a pride party hosted by clothing company Alice + Olivia on June 13, 2024. Nylon magazine unveiled her as the star of its September 2024 cover and hosted a release party for the album on September 5 that featured a live performance by her. A360media released a bespoke magazine titled Pop Icon, focusing on Hilton and the album, on September 20. She made an appearance during Meghan Trainor's The Timeless Tour at Madison Square Garden on September 25, where they performed "Chasin'" and "Stars Are Blind". She headlined a concert at the Hollywood Palladium on October 24.

== Accompanying projects ==
=== Remix album ===
Infinite Icon: The Remixes, an eighteen-track remixed version of the album, was released on May 30, 2025.

=== Concert film ===
A concert film revolving around the making of Infinite Icon is set for a 2026 global release. It is produced by 11:11 Media, in partnership with CJ 4DPlex.

== Critical response ==
Professional ratings
Review scores
Source	Rating
AllMusic	4/5 stars
Sputnikmusic	2.3/5
The Post	3/5

Infinite Icon received mixed reviews from critics. AllMusic's Matt Collar was positive, comparing its sound to Britney Spears and writing that "Infinite Icon builds nicely upon its predecessor, once again revealing Hilton to be a savvy spokesperson for her own stylishly campy brand and a pretty good singer to boot. […] At turns silly and heartfelt, Infinite Icon is both a return to form for Hilton and a sly deconstruction of her image. While Brooke Phillips of The Post felt the album's material is "quite cheesy or out of the norm", she likened it to works of Carly Rae Jepsen and Dua Lipa, opining that it "shows a mature, demure version of Paris Hilton; however, she is not afraid to let the listener know she is still the "It Girl [sic]" we have always known."

Benjamin Jack of Sputnikmusic criticized Infinite Icon, believing it to be unmemorable and "parrots every major mainstream trend it can with far too much confidence, and still manages to feel completely irrelevant." Washington Square News' Ellie Miller called the album "not hot" and, while believing a musical comeback for Hilton was possible, believed it "toes the line between being a passable pop album and another tired celebrity trying to appeal to a younger generation with repetitive lyrics and dull messages."

== Commercial performance ==
In the United States, Infinite Icon debuted at number 38 on the US Billboard 200 and number 7 on the Independent Albums charts with 18,000 album-equivalent units sold. In the United Kingdom, it reached number 34 on the Independent Albums Chart.

== Track listing ==
Infinite Icon track listing
No.	Title	Writer(s)	Producer(s)	Length
1.	"Welcome Back"	Chloe Angelides; Fran Hall; Jesse Shatkin	Shatkin	2:15
2.	"I'm Free" (with Rina Sawayama)	Ultra Naté; Lem Springsteen; John Ciafone; Naliya; Rina Sawayama; Pierre Blondo; John-Adam Howard	House of Wolf; Naliya; Shatkin^{[a]}; Ryland Brockington^{[a]}; Alex Frankel^{[a]}	3:02
3.	"Chasin'" (featuring Meghan Trainor)	Meghan Trainor; Ryan Trainor; Yannick Rastogi; Zacharie Raymond; Paris Hilton	Banx & Ranx; Shatkin^{[a]}	3:15
4.	"BBA" (featuring Megan Thee Stallion)	Deza; Lily Hormel; Myles Avery; Hilton; Shatkin; Frankel; Megan Pete	Avery; Shatkin^{[a]}; Frankel^{[a]}	2:55
5.	"Fame Won't Love You" (with Sia)	Sia; Greg Kurstin; Hilton	Kurstin	3:19
6.	"ADHD"	Shatkin; Hilton	Shatkin	3:23
7.	"Legacy"	Dallas Caton; Alex Chapman; Alexandra Veltri; Hilton	Caton; Shatkin^{[a]}; Frankel^{[a]}	2:18
8.	"Stay Young"	M. Trainor; Tyler Johnson; Kid Harpoon	Kid Harpoon; Shatkin^{[a]}; Frankel^{[a]}	3:30
9.	"Infinity"	M. Trainor; Justin Trainor	J. Trainor; Shatkin^{[a]}; Brockington^{[a]}; Frankel^{[a]}	2:44
10.	"If the Earth Is Spinning" (featuring Sia)	Emily Warren; Deza; Ludvig Söderberg; Sia; Hilton; Frankel	Söderberg; Shatkin^{[a]}; Frankel^{[a]}	3:13
11.	"Without Love" (featuring María Becerra)	Veltri; Chapman; Shatkin	Shatkin	2:46
12.	"Adored"	Caroline Ailin; Caroline Pennell; Shatkin	Shatkin	2:19
Total length:				34:59

Notes

- ^{^[a]} signifies an additional producer
- "I'm Free" contains an interpolation of "Free" by Ultra Naté.
- On some physical editions, Megan Thee Stallion is not featured on "BBA", which is listed as "Bad Bitch Academy" instead.

== Personnel ==
=== Musicians ===
- Paris Hilton – lead vocals
- Jesse Shatkin – drum programming, keyboards (tracks 1–4, 6–12); drums, percussion (1–4, 6, 8, 9, 11, 12); bass (1, 6, 10–12), organ (1), piano (6), guitar (12)
- Taura Stinson – background vocals (tracks 1–4, 6–12)
- Chloe Angelides – background vocals (track 1)
- Rina Sawayama – background vocals (track 2)
- Erick Serna – guitar (tracks 3, 7)
- Keyon Harrold – trumpet (track 3)
- Alex Frankel – keyboards (tracks 4, 9, 10); piano, drum programming (10)
- Greg Kurstin – drums, percussion, bass, guitar, synthesizers, keyboards, piano, marimba (track 5)
- Samuel Dent – strings (track 6)
- Alex Chapman – background vocals (track 11)
- Alexandra Veltri – background vocals (track 11)
- Caroline Pennell – background vocals (track 12)

=== Technical ===
- Emily Lazar – mastering (tracks 1–4, 6–12)
- Chris Gehringer – mastering (track 5)
- Clint Gibbs – mixing (tracks 1–4, 6–12)
- Greg Kurstin – mixing, engineering (track 5)
- Jesse Shatkin – engineering (tracks 1–4, 6–12)
- Samuel Dent – engineering (tracks 1–4, 6–12)
- Ezekiel Chabon – engineering (tracks 1–4, 6–12)
- Nathan Cimino – engineering (tracks 1, 2, 4, 7, 8, 12)
- Julian Burg – engineering (track 5)

=== Visuals ===
- Brian Ziff – photography

== Charts ==
Chart performance for Infinite Icon
Chart (2024)	Peak position
UK Album Downloads (OCC)	33
UK Independent Albums (OCC)	34
US Billboard 200	38
US Independent Albums (Billboard)	7
