= I'm Free (Paris Hilton and Rina Sawayama song) =

2024 single by Paris Hilton and Rina Sawayama

Single by Paris Hilton and Rina Sawayama

from the album Infinite Icon
- Released: June 21, 2024
- Studio: The Ribcage (Los Angeles)
- Genre: Nu-disco; French house; techno-pop
- Length: 3:03
- Label: 11:11 Media
- Songwriters: Rina Sawayama; Naliya; John-Adam Howard; Pierre Blondo; Ultra Naté; Lem Springsteen; John Ciafone
- Producers: House of Wolf; Naliya; Jesse Shatkin; Alex Frankel

Paris Hilton singles chronology
"Fame Won't Love You" (2024)	"I'm Free" (2024)	"Chasin'" (2024)

Rina Sawayama singles chronology
"Kiss Me" (2023)	"I'm Free" (2024)

Music video
- "I'm Free" on YouTube

"I'm Free" is a song by American singer Paris Hilton featuring Japanese singer Rina Sawayama. The nu-disco, french house and techno-pop song was released on June 21, 2024, through 11:11 Media as the lead single from Hilton's second studio album, Infinite Icon.

== Background and composition ==
After announcing her second studio album, Infinite Icon, to be released through her company, 11:11 Media, Hilton released the lead single "I'm Free", featuring Rina Sawayama, on June 21, 2024.

The song contains samples of "Free" by Ultra Naté and "Music Sounds Better with You" by Stardust. It has been described as a nu-disco, french house and techno-pop song. Hilton explained the context behind sampling Ultra Naté's version, and the meaning of "I'm Free":

"I heard it for the first time at a club in New York City shortly after being released from the Provo Canyon School where I experienced mental and physical abuse. For me, the song represents the journey of healing and finding your voice. [...] It has served as an anthem of hope and a guiding light, and I’m honoured to have had the chance to create this new version. I’m also so grateful to have Rina Sawayama’s mesmerising vocals and lyrics on the song. Together, Rina and I hope to inspire fans around the world to embrace their own strong voices and feel free to fully express themselves."

== Music video ==
The music video for the song, directed by Matthew Daniel Siskin, was released on June 21, 2024, through Hilton's YouTube channel.

== Charts ==
Chart performance for "I'm Free"
Chart (2024)	Peak position
Japan Hot Overseas (Billboard Japan)	16
