= BBA (song) =

- Promotional graphic

Single by Paris Hilton featuring Megan Thee Stallion

from the album Infinite Icon
- Released: September 6, 2024
- Studio: The Ribcage (Los Angeles)
- Genre: Electroclash; dance-pop; big room house
- Length: 2:56
- Label: 11:11 Media
- Songwriters: Paris Hilton; Megan Pete; Lily Horme; Myles Avery; Alex Frankel; Jesse Shatkin
- Producers: Myles Avery; Alex Frankel; Jesse Shatkin

Paris Hilton singles chronology
| "Chasin'" (2024) | "BBA" (2024) |

Megan Thee Stallion singles chronology
| "Neva Play" (2024) | "BBA" (2024) | "Bigger in Texas" (2024) |

"BBA" (initialism for "Bad Bitch Academy") is a song by the American media personality and singer Paris Hilton featuring the rapper Megan Thee Stallion. It was released as the third single from Hilton's second studio album, Infinite Icon, on September 6, 2024 through 11:11 Media. Musically, the song is electroclash and big room house with components of dance-pop and hip hop.

== Music video ==
The production for the music video took place in the week of August 20, 2024. It featured appearances by Heidi Klum, Meghan Trainor, Lance Bass and Lele Pons. Megan Thee Stallion didn't appear in this video. During the filming, an RV containing custom outfits made for the music video, among other things including some of Hilton's "favorite things" were lost when the RV burnt down in a fire. It was published on September 6, 2024 through Hilton's YouTube channel.

== Charts ==
Chart performance for "BBA"
| Chart (2024) | Peak position |
|---|---|
| US Dance/Electronic Digital Song Sales (Billboard) | 13 |
