= Hollywood Love Story =

- Written by: Natalia Garcia; Robyn Younie
- Presented by: Paris Hilton
- Country of origin: United States
- Original language: English
- No. of seasons: 1
- No. of episodes: 8

Production
- Executive producers: Andy Capper; Natalia Garcia; Spike Jonze; Gena Konstantinakos; Shane Smith; Robyn Younie
- Producer: Scott Pierce
- Production company: Vice Media

Original release
- Network: Viceland
- Release: July 11 – August 29, 2018

Hollywood Love Story is an American television series hosted by Paris Hilton and broadcast by Viceland, starting on July 11, 2018. It was billed as "an exploration into the turbulent and, oftentimes, dark world of social media stardom".

== Premise ==
Hollywood Love Story is hosted by Paris Hilton and introduces several aspiring artists and Instagram figures trying to make it in modern day Los Angeles.

== Episodes ==
1. "Riiottt"
2. "Sergio and the Spirit Sisters"
3. "Sky"
4. "Maddie"
5. "Mei & Remy"
6. "Josh"
7. "Moe"
8. "Angel"

== See also ==
- List of programs broadcast by Viceland
