= Wishman =

- Directed by: Mike Marvin
- Written by: Mike Marvin
- Produced by: W. Samuel Arnoff; John Paul DeJoria; Curt Hendrix
- Starring: Paul Le Mat; Geoffrey Lewis; Paul Gleason; Quin Kessler; Nancy Parsons; Gailard Sartain; Brion James; Quin Kessler
- Cinematography: Steve Shaw
- Edited by: John Orland; Russ Kingston
- Music by: Bob Christianson
- Release date: 1992
- Running time: 101 minutes
- Country: United States
- Language: English

Wishman is a 1992 American fantasy film written and directed by Mike Marvin and starring Paul Le Mat, Geoffrey Lewis, Brion James and Quin Kessler.

== Premise ==
A genie finds himself homeless in Beverly Hills in search of his magic lamp and seeks the help of a homeless junkman to find it.
