= Loop Earplugs =

Belgian earplug company

Loop Earplugs is a Belgian earplug company founded in 2016 by Maarten Bodewes and Dimitri O.

== Types ==
Loop Experience were launched in 2018 are designed for concerts, festivals, and other loud spaces. Loop Engage block out background noise but allow voices to remain clear, and are intended for loud social places such as restaurants. Loop Quiet are made to block out general sound. Loop Switch allow the user to change between Quiet, Engage, and Experience modes. Loop Dream are designed for sleeping.

Loop earplugs have been designed in limited edition colours as part of collaborations, including with the McLaren Formula 1 Team, Coachella, and Tomorrowland.

== Reception ==
Loop earplugs have been praised for their function, range of colours, and ability to stay in place but some users find them uncomfortable. They have been particularly praised by the neurodivergent community and people with sensory processing disorders.
