= Rainbow High (dolls) =

American fashion doll franchise

- Type: Fashion doll; Web series
- Invented by: Michael Scott Anderson
- Company: MGA Entertainment
- Country: United States
- Availability: 2020–present
- Slogan: Collect the Rainbow (2020–2021); Let Your True Colors Shine (2021–2023); Shine Brighter Together (2024–present)
- Official website

Rainbow High is a fashion doll franchise created by Michael Scott Anderson originally as Rainbow Surprise and released by American toy company MGA Entertainment in 2020 originally as a spin-off from their Poopsie Slime Surprise brand. The back story for the franchise revolves around an elite high school for the visual arts, featuring students who represent colors of the rainbow.

At the close of 2020, the brand became independent from other MGA brands and was complemented with an audiovisual franchise of in-universe-branded web series of animated shorts and episodes, which were predominantly released on YouTube and later made available on Netflix. In February 2022, MGA released the franchise's first official spin-off known as Shadow High to be the brand's rival school, with the spin-off brand spotting/representing grayscale colors in clear contrast to their hosts.

== History ==
- Rainbow High dolls from its launch in 2020. The characters, shown from left to right, are Ruby Anderson, Poppy Rowan, Sunny Madison, Jade Hunter, Skyler Bradshaw and Violet Willow.

In 2019, MGA released a line of 14-inch fashion dolls under their Poopsie brand, named Rainbow Surprise. Though these dolls bear some resemblance to the eventual Rainbow High dolls, they are scaled up and have painted eyes rather than inset eyes. The characters were: Rainbow Dream, Pixie Rose, Amethyst Rae and Blue Skye. These four dolls were later re-released the following year under the Rainbow High brand in new packaging. Rainbow Surprise also included a series of blind-boxed Fantasy Friends dolls which were also incorporated into the Rainbow High brand.

The first 11-inch Rainbow High dolls were released in 2020, with the initial lineup including Ruby Anderson, Poppy Rowan, Sunny Madison, Jade Hunter, Skyler Bradshaw, Violet Willow, Bella Parker and Amaya Raine dolls. Each of the original dolls included two outfits and a doll stand, while the dolls themselves featured inset eyes and thirteen points of articulation.

== Web series ==
A web series of animated shorts was announced following the release of the first dolls. The series is produced by Australian animation studio Pixel Zoo with the financial backing from the Screen Queensland initiative of the Queensland Government with the first episode premiering on October 2, 2020, and additional episodes released at least every fortnight. The web series was complemented with spin-offs premiering every other week; looking at the activities and adventures of Rainbow High in the eyes of Violet Willow with her show, "The Vi Life" (pronounced "vie life"), and Karma Nichols with her show, "Kontent with Karma" with the latter debuting on 16 April 2021.

The web series concluded its first season on 11 June 2021 The second season premiered on 16 July 2021 and concluded on 28 January 2022, with the third season featuring the rival school, "Shadow High", beginning 2 months later on 25 March, and concluded 23 November of that same year. The fourth season premiered on 8 June, 2023 and concluded on 24 November of that same year, ending on a cliffhanger. The fifth season premiered with three episodes on 22 March 2024 and concluded on 6 September of the same year. The sixth season premiered on March 14, 2025 on Roblox Livetopia and premiered on March 27, 2025 on YouTube and concluded on October 24 of the same year. With 3 specials including a 5 part special split into 5 parts during the summer of 2026.

== Reception ==
Following their release in mid-2020, the doll franchise appeared on multiple hot-toy lists including Toys "R" Us Canada and The Toy Insider, while The NPD Group reported in August 2020 that, Rainbow High was the No. 3 best selling fashion doll line and the No. 7 best selling doll line overall in the U.S.
