= List of Billboard number-one dance singles of 2006 =

Billboard magazine compiled the top-performing dance singles in the United States during 2006 on the Hot Dance Club Play, the Hot Dance Singles Sales, and the Hot Dance Airplay. Premiered in 1976, the Hot Dance Club Play chart ranked the most-played singles on dance club based on reports from a national sample of club DJs. The Hot Dance Singles Sales chart was launched in 1985 to compile the best-selling dance singles based on retail sales across the United States. The Hot Dance Airplay was first published in 2003, ranking the singles based on airplay detections on dance radio.

== Charts history ==
Chart history
Issue date	Hot Dance Club Play		Hot Dance Singles Sales		Hot Dance Airplay		Ref.
Issue date	Song	Artist(s)	Song	Artist(s)	Song	Artist(s)	Ref.
January 7	"Perfect Love"	Simply Red	"Hung Up"	Madonna	"Don't Forget About Us"	Mariah Carey	
January 14	"Love Generation"	Bob Sinclar featuring Gary Pine	"Hung Up"	Madonna	"Don't Forget About Us"	Mariah Carey	
January 21	"Don't Forget About Us"	Mariah Carey	"Hung Up"	Madonna	"Don't Forget About Us"	Mariah Carey	
January 28	"House Is Not a Home"	Deborah Cox	"Hung Up"	Madonna	"Everytime We Touch"	Cascada	
February 4	"Number 1"	Goldfrapp	"Hung Up"	Madonna	"Everytime We Touch"	Cascada	
February 11	"Unwritten"	Natasha Bedingfield	"Hung Up"	Madonna	"Everytime We Touch"	Cascada	
February 18	"In My Mind"	Heather Headley	"Hung Up"	Madonna	"Sorry"	Madonna	
February 25	"Rhythm Intoxication"	Rosabel	"Check on It"	Beyoncé featuring Slim Thug	"Sorry"	Madonna	
March 4	"Check on It"	Beyoncé featuring Slim Thug	"Check on It"	Beyoncé featuring Slim Thug	"Sorry"	Madonna	
March 11	"Be Without You"	Mary J. Blige	"Check on It"	Beyoncé featuring Slim Thug	"Sorry"	Madonna	
March 18	"Sorry"	Madonna	"Sorry"	Madonna	"Sorry"	Madonna	
March 25	"Sorry"	Madonna	"Check on It"	Beyoncé featuring Slim Thug	"Sorry"	Madonna	
April 1	"Talk"	Coldplay	"Check on It"	Beyoncé featuring Slim Thug	"Sorry"	Madonna	
April 8	"Glory of Life"	Mink	"Check on It"	Beyoncé featuring Slim Thug	"Be Without You"	Mary J. Blige	
April 15	"Oh Yeah Oh Six"	Yello	"Check on It"	Beyoncé featuring Slim Thug	"Be Without You"	Mary J. Blige	
April 22	"Ooh La La"	Goldfrapp	"Every Day Is Exactly the Same"	Nine Inch Nails	"Be Without You"	Mary J. Blige	
April 29	"Give Me Your Love"	Carl Cox featuring Hannah Robinson	"Every Day Is Exactly the Same"	Nine Inch Nails	"SOS"	Rihanna	
May 6	"It Makes a Difference"	Kim English	"Every Day Is Exactly the Same"	Nine Inch Nails	"SOS"	Rihanna	
May 13	"SOS"	Rihanna	"Every Day Is Exactly the Same"	Nine Inch Nails	"SOS"	Rihanna	
May 20	"I Want More (Cling on to Me)"	Amuka	"Every Day Is Exactly the Same"	Nine Inch Nails	"SOS"	Rihanna	
May 27	"Say Somethin'"	Mariah Carey featuring Snoop Dogg	"Every Day Is Exactly the Same"	Nine Inch Nails	"SOS"	Rihanna	
June 3	"Suffer Well"	Depeche Mode	"Every Day Is Exactly the Same"	Nine Inch Nails	"SOS"	Rihanna	
June 10	"Faster Kill Pussycat"	Oakenfold featuring Brittany Murphy	"Every Day Is Exactly the Same"	Nine Inch Nails	"SOS"	Rihanna	
June 17	"The One That Got Away"	Natasha Bedingfield	"Every Day Is Exactly the Same"	Nine Inch Nails	"SOS"	Rihanna	
June 24	"Get Together"	Madonna	"Get Together"	Madonna	"Get Together"	Madonna	
July 1	"Tracking Treasure Down"	Gabriel & Dresden	"Get Together"	Madonna	"What's Left of Me"	Nick Lachey	
July 8	"Make a Move on Me"	Joey Negro	"Get Together"	Madonna	"What's Left of Me"	Nick Lachey	
July 15	"World, Hold On (Children of the Sky)"	Bob Sinclar	"Get Together"	Madonna	"Get Together"	Madonna	
July 22	"World, Hold On (Children of the Sky)"	Bob Sinclar	"Every Day Is Exactly The Same"	Nine Inch Nails	"Get Together"	Madonna	
July 29	"Unfaithful"	Rihanna	"Every Day Is Exactly The Same"	Nine Inch Nails	"Get Together"	Madonna	
August 5	"Promiscuous"	Nelly Furtado featuring Timbaland	"Stars Are Blind"	Paris Hilton	"Unfaithful"	Rihanna	
August 12	"Promiscuous"	Nelly Furtado featuring Timbaland	"Stars Are Blind"	Paris Hilton	"Unfaithful"	Rihanna	
August 19	"C'est la Vie"	Kim English	"Stars Are Blind"	Paris Hilton	"Unfaithful"	Rihanna	
August 26	"Stars Are Blind"	Paris Hilton	"Stars Are Blind"	Paris Hilton	"Ain't No Other Man"	Christina Aguilera	
September 2	"Lost"	Roger Sanchez	"Deja Vu"	Beyoncé featuring Jay-Z	"Ain't No Other Man"	Christina Aguilera	
September 9	"Ain't No Other Man"	Christina Aguilera	"Deja Vu"	Beyoncé featuring Jay-Z	"Ain't No Other Man"	Christina Aguilera	
September 16	"Ain't No Other Man"	Christina Aguilera	"Deja Vu"	Beyoncé featuring Jay-Z	"Ain't No Other Man"	Christina Aguilera	
September 23	"Turn It Up"	Paris Hilton	"Sophia"	The Crüxshadows	"Ain't No Other Man"	Christina Aguilera	
September 30	"Buttons"	The Pussycat Dolls featuring Snoop Dogg	"Shut Me Up"	Mindless Self Indulgence	"SexyBack"	Justin Timberlake	
October 7	"A Public Affair"	Jessica Simpson	"Shut Me Up"	Mindless Self Indulgence	"SexyBack"	Justin Timberlake	
October 14	"Deja Vu"	Beyoncé featuring Jay-Z	"Shut Me Up"	Mindless Self Indulgence	"SexyBack"	Justin Timberlake	
October 21	"Is It Love?"	iio	"Shut Me Up"	Mindless Self Indulgence	"What a Feeling"	Peter Luts & Dominico	
October 28	"SexyBack"	Justin Timberlake	"Shut Me Up"	Mindless Self Indulgence	"What a Feeling"	Peter Luts & Dominico	
November 4	"Gone"	Sun	"Every Day Is Exactly The Same"	Nine Inch Nails	"What a Feeling"	Peter Luts & Dominico	
November 11	"Hard"	Africanism	"Every Day Is Exactly The Same"	Nine Inch Nails	"Jump"	Madonna	
November 18	"Jump"	Madonna	"Every Day Is Exactly The Same"	Nine Inch Nails	"Jump"	Madonna	
November 25	"Jump"	Madonna	"Jump"	Madonna	"Jump"	Madonna	
December 2	"Fucking Boyfriend"	The Bird and the Bee	"Jump"	Madonna	"Jump"	Madonna	
December 9	"Maneater"	Nelly Furtado	"Jump"	Madonna	"Jump"	Madonna	
December 16	"Ring the Alarm"	Beyoncé	"Jump"	Madonna	"My Love"	Justin Timberlake featuring T.I.	
December 23	"Lost Yo Mind"	Pepper MaShay	"Jump"	Madonna	"My Love"	Justin Timberlake featuring T.I.	
December 30	"Lost Yo Mind"	Pepper MaShay	"Jump"	Madonna	"My Love"	Justin Timberlake featuring T.I.	

== See also ==
- 2006 in music
- List of Billboard Hot 100 number ones of 2006
