= A House Is Not a Home =

A House Is Not a Home may refer to:

== Television ==
- A House Is Not a Home (TV series), a 1977 Hong Kong TV series, also known as 家變 (Ga bin)
- "A House Is Not a Home", an episode of Cheers
- "A House Is Not a Home", an episode of Gilmore Girls
- "A House Is Not a Home", an episode of Moesha
- "A House Is Not a Home", an episode of Against the Grain (TV series)

== Other uses ==
- A House Is Not a Home, a 1953 autobiography by Polly Adler
- A House Is Not a Home (film), a 1964 American film
- "A House Is Not a Home" (song), a 1964 song written by Burt Bacharach and Hal David recorded by Dionne Warwick and the 1981 cover version by Luther Vandross
- "House Is Not A Home", 1993 single by Charles & Eddie from their album Duophonic
- "House Is Not a Home", a 2005 song by Deborah Cox
- "A House Is Not A Home", 2007 single by Field Music from their album "Tones Of Town"
