= Jump (Madonna song) =

2006 single by Madonna

Single by Madonna

from the album Confessions on a Dance Floor
- B-side: "History"
- Released: September 11, 2006
- Recorded: 2005
- Studio: Stuart Price's home (London, England)
- Genre: Pop; synth-pop; techno; disco
- Length: 3:58 (album version); 3:22 (radio edit)
- Label: Warner Bros.
- Songwriters: Madonna; Stuart Price; Joe Henry
- Producers: Madonna; Stuart Price

Madonna singles chronology
"Get Together" (2006)	"Jump" (2006)	"Hey You" (2007)

Music video
- "Jump" on YouTube

"Jump" is a song by American singer Madonna from her tenth studio album Confessions on a Dance Floor (2005). Written by and produced by Madonna and Stuart Price with additional writing by Joe Henry, the song was supposed to be released as the third single of the album. However, since "Get Together" was decided as the third single based on its digital sales, "Jump" was sent to hot adult contemporary radios in the United States as the fourth and final single from the album on September 11, 2006, by Warner Bros. Records. The song incorporates pop, synth-pop, techno and disco music with tributes to Pet Shop Boys. Madonna sings in her lower register in the song. Its lyrics talk about self-empowerment and sufficiency while looking for the prospects of a new relationship.

Upon release, "Jump" received generally positive reviews from music critics, who praised the club anthem-like quality of the song. Commercially, "Jump" peaked inside the top ten of the charts of some European countries, topping the charts in Italy and Hungary. In the United States, "Jump" placed in several Billboard dance charts, although it did not enter the Billboard Hot 100 chart. The music video for the song was shot in Tokyo during Madonna's 2006 Confessions Tour stopover. It portrayed Madonna in a blond bob wig and a leather ensemble singing the song in front of a number of neon signs. The video also featured dancers who performed the physical discipline parkour. It was also performed on her Confessions Tour, where Madonna and her dancers jumped around the stage actively, while singing the song. The song was used in the movie The Devil Wears Prada (2006) and the Ugly Betty season 2 finale in 2008.

== Background and release ==
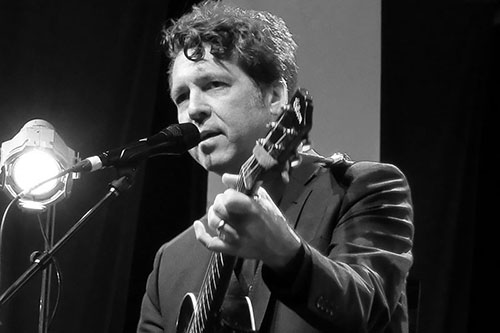
Joe Henry (pictured) co-wrote the song with Madonna and Stuart Price.

The idea for "Jump" came from Madonna's brother-in-law Joe Henry, who presented it to her and developed it into a song. During an interview with the singer for the British gay lifestyle magazine Attitude, journalist Matthew Todd suggested that "Jump" was an inspiration for "a whole generation of gay kids to pack their bags and head to the big city", to which Madonna agreed.

Initially, the track was set to be released as the third single from Confessions on a Dance Floor, following "Hung Up" and "Sorry", but "Get Together" was released instead, spurred by the fact that it was the third best-selling song from the record digitally. Its digital sales stood at 20,000 at that time, whereas digital sales for "Jump" were around 9,000. Additionally, "Get Together" was chosen as the third single to coincide with the start of Madonna's 2006 Confessions Tour.

On July 12, 2006, it was confirmed by Billboard that "Jump" would be the fourth single from the album. The song was sent to hot adult contemporary radios in the United States on September 11, 2006, by Warner Bros. Records, as the record company wanted to establish the track as a hit at those formats before they attempted to bring it to Top 40 CHR radio stations.

They hoped it could fare better on radio following the disappointment of "Get Together", but according to Billboard's Keith Caulfield, "but we're being realistic here: If programmers turned up their collective noses at the super-catchy 'Sorry,' then why would they suddenly come to the table for 'Jump'?". It was made available digitally in the region on October 24, 2006, while it was issued in the United Kingdom on November 6. "Jump" was also used in the soundtrack of the 2006 film The Devil Wears Prada, as well as on the Ugly Betty season 2 finale, titled "Jump", aired on May 22, 2008.

== Composition and lyrics ==
"Jump"
A 23-second sample of "Jump" where Madonna sings the pre-chorus. Her voice range spans from D_{3} to A_{4}.

"Jump" was written and produced by Madonna and Stuart Price. Musically, the song is a pop, synth-pop, techno and disco song which finds Madonna singing in her lower register. The song is set in common time with moderately fast tempo. It is set in the key of E minor. Madonna's voice spans from D_{3} to A_{4}.

The track follows in the chord progression of E–D–C–D in the verses, and C–D–E in the chorus, with an E synth drone playing continually. Some reviewers observed that the opening synth line of "Jump" was similar to that of English duo Pet Shop Boys' 1984 single "West End Girls". For Slant Magazine's Ed Henderson, the song is "paced about a half-dozen BPMs slower than a disco gallop—giving the impression of a DJ pitch-shifting a familiar chestnut to give it a blue, after-hours glow".

Lyrically "Jump" talks about empowerment and the urge to move on from one situation to another. For Alan Light from Rolling Stone, the lyrics reflected Madonna's change of style from her previous singles about supremacy like "Everybody" (1982), "Vogue" (1990) and "Music" (2000), which were centered around the subject of music itself, and shifting her focus on self-sufficiency. The line "I can make it alone" in the song demonstrated the shift. Keith Caulfield of Billboard believed that the song has a "positive universal message about believing in yourself, not wasting time and taking a chance in life", whereas according to Samuel R. Murrian from Parade, on the track, Madonna "sings about the possibilities of finding new love, and appears to reflect upon the move to NYC she made as a teen". The lyrics were also compared to the lyrics of Madonna's 1990 single "Keep It Together" by some critics, as they shared a similar theme surrounding family.

== Critical reception ==
Upon release, "Jump" received generally positive reviews from music critics. Keith Caulfield from Billboard complimented the song's "empowerment" theme, while Margaret Moser of The Austin Chronicle called it "slinky and sexy". City Pages' Peter S. Scholtes considered the track "very pretty". While reviewing the album, Alan Braidwood from BBC Music called the song as "lethally catchy" and one of the album's highlights. David Browne from Entertainment Weekly called "Jump", along with "Get Together", as fluid in nature. Jon Pareles of The New York Times wrote that Madonna's "somber side sounds best in 'Jump', about the urge to move on". On his review for People, Chuck Arnold stated that "a new wavish energy drives pulsating tracks like 'Jump'". Writing for Salon, Camille Paglia shared her opinion that on the album "there are only two truly strong songs, 'Hung Up' and 'Jump' -- especially the latter, with its magnificent, hymnlike ascensions". For David Byrne from RTÉ, the song "comes out of nowhere and we go for one last boogie". From The Times, Mike Pattenden said that "Jump" and "How High" perform a "breathless one-two".

Folha de S.Paulo commented that "with a catchy chorus, it sounds like it was made to lift stadiums". Slant Magazine's Sal Cinquemani commented that the song is a "gritty club anthem that wouldn't have sounded out of place on Erotica". Isabel Mohan from Heat stated that "Jump" should join the likes of "Vogue" and "Into the Groove" as a Madonna classic. A negative review came from newspaper Herald Sun, which called it "a little 80's-ish, more bleeps and beats with a smooth dance sheen, but still feels like filler". In another negative review, Johnny Davis of Q magazine stated, "Jump, likewise isn't quite the copper-bottomed pop song it thinks it is". Het Nieuwsblad's Mark Coppens was also negative, observing that "this song already begs for a remix, because this version sounds a bit lame in our opinion. Technopop might be trendy again, but trendwatchers don't mean this plastic melody".

== Commercial performance ==
In the United States, "Jump" reached number five on the Bubbling Under Hot 100 Singles chart, failing to progress further and chart on the Billboard Hot 100. The song also reached a peak of 21 on the Adult Contemporary chart on the issue dated January 27, 2007. It reached the top of the Hot Dance Club Songs chart on the issue dated November 18, 2006, becoming Madonna's 37th number-one single on the chart. "Jump" also became Madonna's seventh number-one single on the Hot Singles Sales chart, as well as her fourth consecutive number-one single on the Dance/Mix Show Airplay chart. The song sold 31,000 digital downloads and 8,000 physical singles in the United States, according to Nielsen SoundScan. In Canada, the single reached numbers 38 and 39 on the Adult Contemporary and CHR/Top 40 charts, respectively.

In the United Kingdom, "Jump" debuted at number 59 on the singles chart for the week ending November 11, 2006 and reached a peak of number nine the next week, thus becoming Madonna's fourth top ten single from the Confessions on a Dance Floor album there. According to Music Week magazine, 52,038 copies of the single have been sold in the United Kingdom as of August 2008, thus becoming Madonna's 63rd best selling single in the region. In other European nations, the track reached number one in Hungary and Italy, as well peaking inside the top ten in countries like Denmark, Finland, Netherlands and Spain, and the top 40 of the rest of the countries such as Austria, Belgium's Flanders and Wallonia, Germany, Ireland, Sweden and Switzerland. Across the pan-Eurochart Hot 100 Singles, it reached a peak of number 19. In Australia, "Jump" debuted and peaked at 29 on the national chart.

== Music video ==
Madonna sporting a blond bob wig and a leather ensemble, in the music video of "Jump"

While finishing her Confessions Tour in Japan, Madonna took time out from her schedule to shoot the video for "Jump". It was directed by her longtime collaborator Jonas Åkerlund. The shoot took place in various outdoor locations throughout Tokyo, as well as on a soundstage. Madonna and hairstylist Andy LeCompte decided to try a new look for her, a platinum blonde bob wig. She wore this wig in the last two nights of the tour. Madonna also wore a black leather garment, which Entertainment Weekly writer Michael Slezak wrote accentuated her "toned body".

The singer's look in the music video drives a strong resemblance to the character Mello from Death Note. The video featured the physical discipline parkour, in which parkour artist Sébastien Foucan performed routines around the buildings of Tokyo. An exclusive sneak peek of the clip was made available on Madonna's official website on October 3, 2006, with the full video being released the next day through AOL Music.

The video begins showing the Tokyo skyline and parkour artists standing on rooftops. As the spoken introduction starts, Madonna is shown in her wig dancing in front of a number of neon signs which contain the words "Madonna" and "Jump" in Japanese. The song continues with the dancers jumping from buildings and running through and over the lanes of the city. Madonna dances to the music and swivels around metallic rods in front of and around her, of the same design present in her tour.

Before the final chorus, the dancers cease their parkour routines and stand on a lamppost. As the chorus starts, Foucan is joined by parkour traceur Levi Meeuwenberg and Exo as they continue their routine around and against buildings. The video ends with Madonna stretching her upper body and a shot of the Tokyo evening-sky. Entertainment Weekly's Slezak was not impressed with the video overall writing, "[f]orget about low concept, we're talking no concept! For all the money spent capturing footage of impressive rooftop leaps, I wish Madonna had chosen instead to offer us a visually sumptuous slice of storytelling, something along the lines of 'Express Yourself' or 'Bedtime Story'."

== Live performances ==
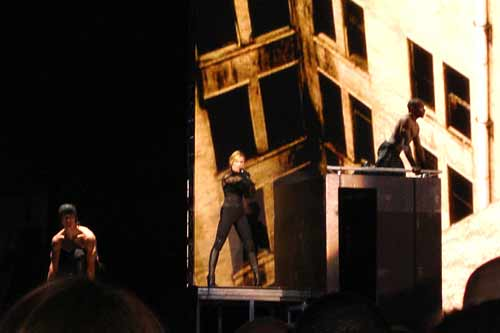
Madonna (center) singing "Jump" while dancers perform parkour routines, on the 2006 Confessions Tour

As part of a promotional tour for Confessions on a Dance Floor, Madonna performed "Jump" during her concert at G-A-Y nightclub in London, on November 18, 2005; Hassan Mirza, writing for the club's website, stated that when Madonna started singing the song, "everyone did the obvious, probably breaking the foundation of the venue". "Jump" was later performed on the 2006 Confessions Tour, as part of the first segment of the show. Madonna wore a skin-tight, full body black leotard.

As the performance of "Like a Virgin" ended, Madonna sat on a platform and announced "Ladies and Gentleman! Thank you for coming to our show. The night is young, and the show has just begun." A huge assortment of steel rods and gymnastic equipment were planted on the stage. Madonna started singing the song, as her dancers started running around, displaying routines in parkour. Madonna climbs on blocks to sing the song as well as to strike poses.

As the final chorus approached, Madonna went to the front of the stage and struck poses while holding on to the steel rods. The song continued with Madonna swiveling around the rods and the dancers continuing their routine. The performance ends with Madonna disappearing through the middle of the stage and her dancers doing a final vault before the lights are turned off.

Sal Cinquemani of Slant Magazine commented that the parkour from the performance was "really awesome", while Leslie Gray Streeter of The Palm Beach Post considered it "delightful". According to The Philadelphia Inquirer newspaper, musically the most successful numbers of the show were "those free of too much high-concept staging and blessed with catchy tunes", such as "Jump". Corey Moss from MTV News wrote that the performance of "Jump" might have featured "the most impressive eye candy of all". Between the jungle gym that descended onto the runway and the crew of perfectly toned tumblers racing around, it was like the Olympic gymnastics freestyles finals on Red Bull".

Thomas Inksweep of Stylus Magazine reported that it was "utterly sensational. Sure, it’s not all that different from the version found on Dance Floor, but it’s so damned exciting to begin with, why mess with it?" Kitty Empire, writer for The Observer, noted that "Jump" was "one of many songs from Madonna's recent Confessions on a Dance Floor album greeted with the sort of cheers usually reserved for old hits". The song was included in both the CD and DVD of the live album, The Confessions Tour (2007). In the 2008–09 Sticky & Sweet Tour, "Jump" was sampled in the song "Into the Groove" during which Madonna performed stunts in the air. The performance was later included in both the CD and DVD of the live album, Sticky & Sweet Tour (2010).

== Track listings and formats ==
- UK and European CD single
1. "Jump" (Album Version) – 3:59
2. "Jump" (Extended Album Version) – 5:09
- UK CD single 2
1. "Jump" (Radio Edit) – 3:22
2. "Jump" (Junior Sanchez's Misshapes Mix) – 6:49
3. "History" – 5:55
- US and European 2× 12-inch vinyl
1. "Jump" (Jacques Lu Cont Mix) – 7:47
2. "Jump" (Album Version) – 3:59
3. "Jump" (Extended Album Version) – 5:09
4. "Jump" (Axwell Remix) – 6:38
5. "Jump" (Junior Sanchez's-Misshapes Mix) – 6:49
6. "History" – 5:54
7. "Jump" (Radio Edit) – 3:22
- US and Canadian maxi-CD
1. "Jump" (Radio Edit) – 3:22
2. "Jump" (Jacques Lu Cont Mix) – 7:47
3. "Jump" (Axwell Remix) – 6:38
4. "Jump" (Junior Sanchez's-Misshapes Mix) – 6:49
5. "Jump" (Extended Album Version) – 5:09
6. "History" – 5:55
- UK 12-inch picture vinyl
1. "Jump" (Jacques Lu Cont Mix) – 7:47
2. "Jump" (Extended Album Version) – 5:09
3. "History" – 5:54
- Digital single
1. "Jump" (Jacques Lu Cont Mix) – 7:48
2. "Jump" (Extended) – 5:09
3. "History" – 5:56
- Digital single
1. "Jump" – 3:23
2. "Jump" (Jacques Lu Cont Edit) – 5:21
3. "Jump" (Axwell Remix Edit) – 4:46
4. "Jump" (Junior Sanchez's-Misshapes Mix Edit) – 4:50
5. "Jump" (Extended) – 5:09
6. "History" – 5:56

== Credits and personnel ==
Personnel are adapted from the album's liner notes.

- Madonna – vocals, songwriter, producer
- Stuart Price – songwriter, producer, recording at Shirland Road
- Joe Henry – songwriter
- Alex Dromgoole – assistant engineer
- Mark "Spike" Stent – audio mixing
- Brian "Big Bass" Gardner – master recording

== Charts ==
=== Weekly charts ===
Weekly chart performance for "Jump"
Chart (2006–2007)	Peak position
Australia (ARIA)	29
Austria (Ö3 Austria Top 40)	20
Belgium (Ultratop 50 Flanders)	18
Belgium (Ultratop 50 Wallonia)	27
Canada AC (Billboard)	38
Canada CHR/Top 40 (Billboard)	39
Canada Hot AC (Billboard)	49
Czech Republic Airplay (ČNS IFPI)	20
Denmark (Tracklisten)	7
European Hot 100 Singles (Billboard)	19
Finland (Suomen virallinen lista)	2
Germany (GfK)	23
Germany Airplay (BVMI)	4
Global Dance Songs (Billboard)	5
Greece (IFPI)	7
Hungary (Rádiós Top 40)	1
Ireland (IRMA)	19
Italy (FIMI)	1
Netherlands (Dutch Top 40)	5
Netherlands (Single Top 100)	6
Poland (Polish Airplay Charts)	4
Romania (Romanian Top 100)	6
Russia Airplay (TopHit)	5
Scottish Singles Sales (Official Charts)	7
Slovakia Airplay (ČNS IFPI)	2
Spain (Promusicae)	3
Sweden (Sverigetopplistan)	40
Switzerland (Schweizer Hitparade)	21
UK Singles (Official Charts)	9
UK Dance (Official Charts)	1
US Bubbling Under Hot 100 (Billboard)	5
US Adult Contemporary (Billboard)	21
US Dance Club Songs (Billboard)	1
US Dance Singles Sales (Billboard)	1
US Dance Airplay (Billboard)	1
US Hot Singles Sales (Billboard)	1
Venezuela Pop Rock (Record Report)	5

=== Year-end charts ===
Year-end chart performance for "Jump"
Chart (2006)	Position
Hungary (Rádiós Top 40)	73
Italy (FIMI)	29
Netherlands (Dutch Top 40)	82
Russia Airplay (TopHit)	67
US Dance Singles Sales (Billboard)	20
US Hot Dance Airplay (Billboard)	16
US Hot Singles Sales (Billboard)	63

Chart (2007)	Position
Italy (FIMI)	47
US Hot Dance Airplay (Billboard)	22
US Hot Singles Sales (Billboard)	18

=== Decade-end charts ===
Decade-end chart performance for "Jump"
Chart (2000–09)	Position
US Dance Club Songs (Billboard)	13

== Sales ==
Sales for "Jump"
Region	Certification	Certified units/sales
United Kingdom	—	52,038
United States	—	39,000

== Release history ==
Release dates and formats for "Jump"
Region	Date	Format(s)	Label(s)	Ref.
United States	September 11, 2006	Hot adult contemporary radio	Warner Bros.	
United States	October 24, 2006	Digital download (EP)	Warner Bros.	
United Kingdom	November 6, 2006	CD; maxi CD	Warner Music	
France	November 7, 2006	Maxi CD	Warner Music	
Australia	November 13, 2006	CD	Warner Music	
Germany	November 17, 2006	12-inch vinyl	Warner Music	
Germany	November 24, 2006	CD; maxi CD	Warner Music	

== See also ==
- List of number-one hits of 2006 (Italy)
- List of number-one singles of the 2000s (Hungary)
- List of number-one dance airplay hits of 2006 (U.S.)
- List of Billboard Hot Dance Club Play number ones of 2006
