= Turn It Up (Paris Hilton song) =

Single by Paris Hilton

from the album Paris
- Released: July 11, 2006
- Length: 3:14
- Label: Warner Bros.
- Songwriter(s): Scott Storch; Penelope Magnet; Jeff Bowden; Paris Hilton
- Producer(s): Scott Storch

Paris Hilton singles chronology
| "Stars Are Blind" (2006) | "Turn It Up" (2006) | "Nothing in This World" (2006) |

Audio sample
- file; help

"Turn It Up" is a song by American television personality and socialite Paris Hilton from her self-titled debut studio album Paris (2006). The song was written by Hilton, along with Jeff Bowden, Dorian Hardnett and Scott Storch. It reached number one on the Billboard Hot Dance Club Play chart.

== Track listing ==
- Digital download
1. "Turn It Up" — 3:14
- Digital download (U.S. Maxi Single)
1. "Turn It Up" (Paul Oakenfold Remix Edit) — 4:59
2. "Turn It Up" (DJ Dan's Hot 2 Trot Edit) — 4:48
3. "Turn It Up" (DJ Dan's Hot 2 Trot Dub Edit) — 4:47
4. "Turn It Up" (Peter Rauhofer Does Paris Edit) — 4:57
5. "Turn It Up" (Peter Rauhofer Turns It Up Edit) — 4:58
- CD single
1. "Turn It Up" (Album Version) — 3:11
2. "Turn It Up" (DJ Dan's Hot 2 Trot Edit) — 3:48
3. "Turn It Up" (Paul Oakenfold Remix) — 5:44
4. "Turn It Up" (DJ Dan's Hot 2 Trot Dub) — 8:04
5. "Turn It Up" (DJ Dan's Hot 2 Trot Vocal) — 6:35
6. "Turn It Up" (Peter Rauhofer Does Paris) — 8:13
7. "Turn It Up" (Peter Rauhofer Turns It Up Mix) — 9:22
- 12" vinyl
1. "Turn It Up" (Album Version) — 3:11
2. "Turn It Up" (DJ Dan's Hot 2 Trot Vocal) — 6:35
3. "Turn It Up" (Paul Oakenfold Remix) — 5:44
4. "Turn It Up" (DJ Dan's Hot 2 Trot Dub) — 8:04
5. "Turn It Up" (Peter Rauhofer Turns It Up Mix) — 9:35
6. "Turn It Up" (Peter Rauhofer Does Paris) — 8:13
7. "Turn It Up" (Peter Rauhofer Remix Edit) — 4:55

== Charts ==
| Chart (2006) | Peak position |
|---|---|
| US Dance Club Songs (Billboard) | 1 |

== Release history ==
Release dates and formats for "Turn It Up"
| Region | Date | Format | Label | Ref. |
|---|---|---|---|---|
| United States | July 11, 2006 | Digital download | Warner Bros. | |
| United States | July 18, 2006 | Digital download | Warner Bros. | |
| United States | August 15, 2006 | CD | Warner Bros. | |
| Canada | August 22, 2006 | CD | Warner Bros. | |
| United States | September 5, 2006 | 12" | Warner Bros. | |

== See also ==
- List of number-one dance singles of 2006 (U.S.)
