= Skitronic =

Hong Kong electronics manufacturer

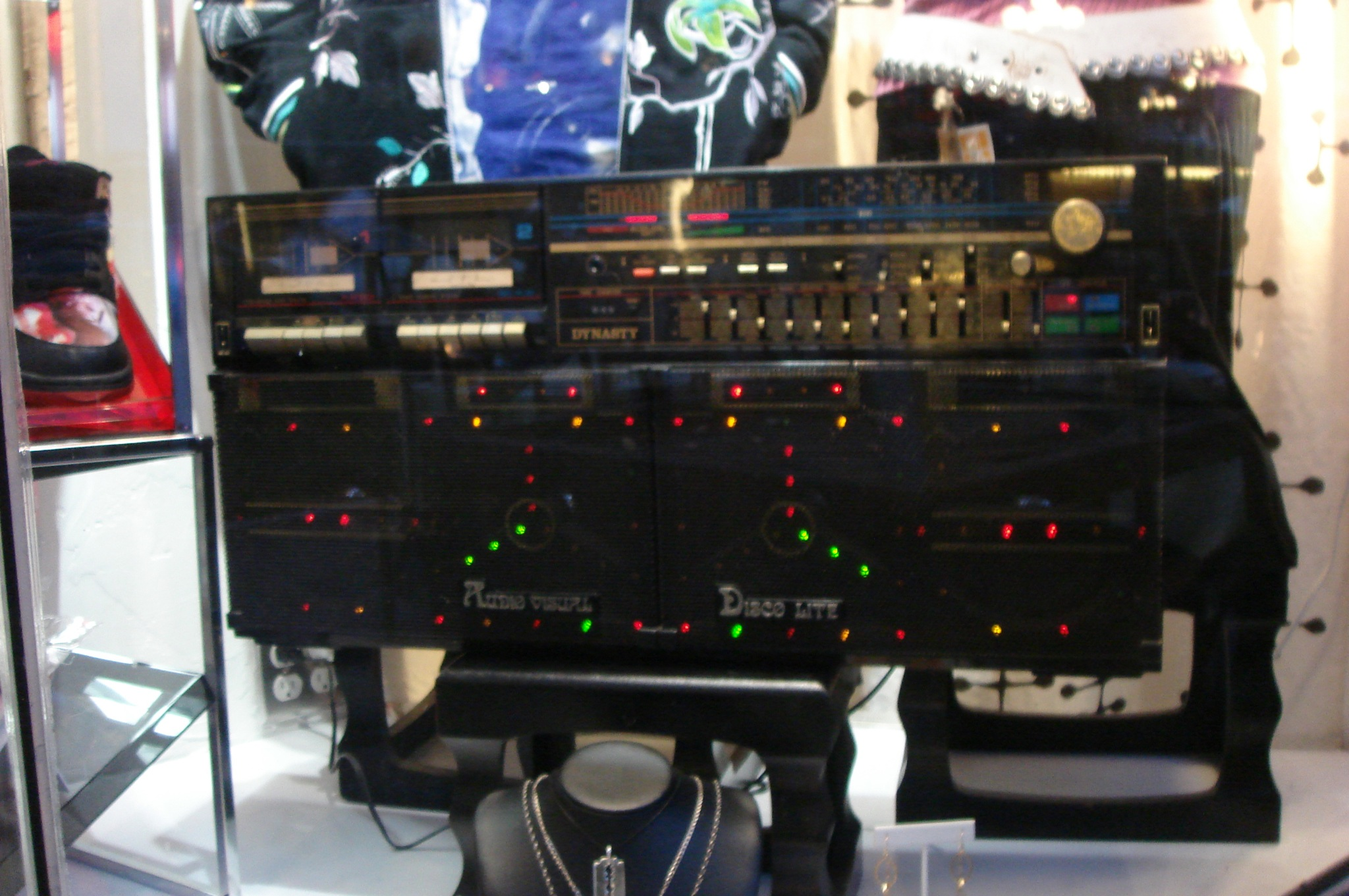
Dynasty ES-555 Disco-Lite by Skitronic Limited - the ghetto blaster with LED illuminations

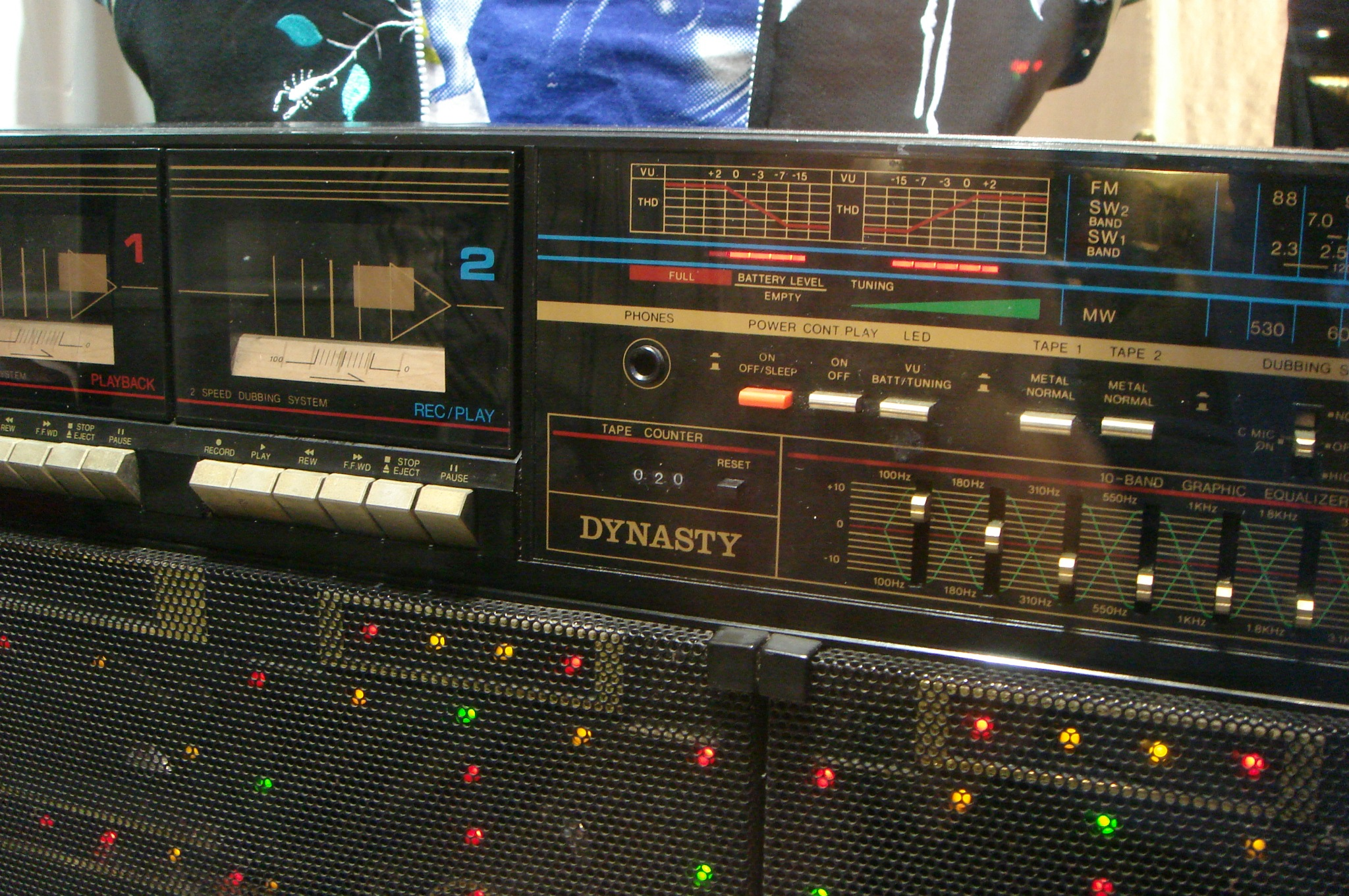
details

Skitronic Limited is an electronics manufacturer from Hong Kong which made the "Disco Lite" boombox in the mid-1980s under several different names. The company was founded in 1979 and dissolved in 2003.

The Disco Lite boombox was released in 1986 but was not filed for patent until 1987 (and granted patent in 1989) and features various multi-colored lights that flash in response to the sounds emitted from the music player. Allegedly inspired by the Sharp GF-777, the "Personal Disco Component" was made more for the eyes than the ears, bringing the feel of the disco lounge to the street. The Disco Lite has been featured in several music videos in the 2000s by Madonna ("Hung Up", 2005 and "Sorry", 2006), and Lady Gaga's 2008 "Just Dance".

== DiscoLite names ==
- Breakdancer BD-8000
- Vela Disco-1

Other Disco Lite makes and models unconfirmed to be made by Skitronic are the Cougar JR800, Diamond FL-990, Dynasty ES-555, and Spacetech ST-701.
