= Paris (Paris Hilton album) =

Studio album by Paris Hilton
- Released: August 14, 2006
- Recorded: 2004–2006
- Genre: Pop
- Length: 39:50
- Label: Warner Bros.
- Producers: Scott Storch; Fernando Garibay; J. R. Rotem; Dr. Luke; Greg Wells; Kara DioGuardi; Rob Cavallo

Paris Hilton chronology
Paris (2006)	Infinite Icon (2024)

Singles from Paris
- 1. "Stars Are Blind" Released: June 5, 2006; 2. "Turn It Up" Released: July 11, 2006; 3. "Nothing in This World" Released: August 28, 2006

Paris is the debut studio album by American media personality and singer Paris Hilton. After becoming available for online streaming on AOL Music on August 14, 2006, the albums physical CD's were released on August 22 by Warner Bros. Records. Hilton primarily collaborated with producer Scott Storch, with contributions from Fernando Garibay, J.R. Rotem, Dr. Luke and Greg Wells. Musically, Paris is a pop album that is influenced by hip hop. It also incorporates elements of reggae, soul, pop rock and R&B.

Upon its release, Paris received mixed reviews from music critics, but saw commercial success, peaking at number six on the US Billboard 200. Three singles were released from the album. "Stars Are Blind" was released as the lead single on June 5, 2006, to critical and commercial success. It peaked at number 18 on the Billboard Hot 100 and remained in the chart for 12 weeks. The second single, "Turn It Up", was successful on the Billboard Dance Club Songs chart, peaking at number one. "Nothing in This World", the album's third and final single, was released on August 28, 2006, and peaked at number 12 on the Billboard Dance Club Songs chart.

== Background and recording ==
Hilton first announced plans to record an album in 2003 during the production of her reality television series The Simple Life. After established her own Heiress Records, a sub-label of Warner Bros. Records, she initially collaborated with Romeo Antonio, Robb Boldt, JC Chasez, and Rob Cavallo, the latter of whom was set to serve as a producer for the entire record. Jane Wiedlin, of The Go-Go's, served as a vocal coach for Hilton, and recalled in an interview: "The first time she sang she was super nervous and she just didn't really have experience singing. And one of the main things I did was kind of guide her through the vocals. And as she is getting more and more comfortable in the studio, she is just getting better and better. I think people are going to be really surprised when they hear the record. It's going to be good."

In 2004, Hilton was pitched the song "Screwed", written by Kara DioGuardi and Greg Wells, but Haylie Duff said in an interview that "Screwed" was actually intended to be recorded by her and would be the first single from her debut album, which was later cancelled. This resulted in a legal battle for the song. In August 2004, a low fidelity leak of Hilton's recording of the song circulated onto the Internet from an Orlando radio station airing. Hilton recorded a new version of the song and was planning to shoot a music video with David LaChapelle. Not long afterwards, Duff was dropped by Hollywood Records, which allowed Hilton to claim the song as hers.

In 2005, Hilton met with the producer Scott Storch in Miami and was invited to his recording studio. After recording the song "Turn It Up", she decided to change the musical direction of the album and make more hip hop and R&B-influenced songs. After months of collaboration with Storch, with contributions from Fernando Garibay, Dr. Luke, J.R. Rotem, and Greg Wells, Paris was finally complete and ready for release.

== Release and promotion ==
Before the album's physical CD's release on August 22, 2006, AOL Music made Paris available in its entirety for exclusive online streaming for two weeks, beginning August 14, as part of a "Full CD Listening Party". To promote the album, Hilton held in-store signings, release parties and press junkets in Los Angeles, New York City, Las Vegas, Miami and Tokyo. On August 22, YouTube promoted Paris in its first targeted advertising launch.

During the first week of the album's release, Hilton became a target of the street artist Banksy, when 500 copies of her album in 48 record shops across the United Kingdom were replaced with his own alternative version. His rework of the album featured remixes produced by himself and Danger Mouse. The track list contained satire song titles such as "Why Am I Famous?", "What Have I Done?" and "What Am I For?" He also changed the cover sleeve and booklet to display pictures of the singer topless. The original barcode had been left on the album so people could buy the CD without realising it had been interfered.

== Singles ==
"Turn It Up" was slated to be the album's lead single, and was commissioned for remixes by Paul Oakenfold, Peter Rauhofer, and Tracy Young. It premiered at the Winter Music Conference in March 2006, but a last-minute decision was made to release "Stars Are Blind", which was to radio in May. "Stars Are Blind" was released digitally June 20 and as a CD-maxi single on July 18. "Turn It Up" was released as the second single on July 11, and on 12-inch vinyl on August 22. "Nothing in This World" followed as the third and final single on August 28.

== Critical reception ==
Professional ratings
Aggregate scores
Source	Rating
Metacritic	57/100
Review scores
Source	Rating
AllMusic	4.5/5 stars
Entertainment Weekly	B
The Guardian	2/5 stars
musicOMH	1/5 stars
The Observer	3/5 stars
Pitchfork	5.2/10
Robert Christgau	(dud)
Rolling Stone	3/5 stars
Slant Magazine	3/5 stars
Yahoo! Music UK	7/10

Paris received generally mixed reviews from music critics. At Metacritic, which assigns a normalized rating, out of 100, to reviews from mainstream critics, the album received an average score of 57, based on 17 reviews, which indicates "mixed or average reviews". AllMusic was positive, commenting that the album was "more fun than anything released by Britney Spears or Jessica Simpson, and a lot fresher, too". Mark Daniels from Yahoo! Music called the album "actually rather good", before adding, "To many it'll appear that [...] Ms. Hilton has bought herself a singing career. And in many ways it could be argued that she has. But so what? With some contagious pop, genuinely stylish moments and a complete lack of inane ballads, it was worth every penny". According to Billboard's Keith Caulfield, "Does it matter that Paris Hilton isn't a great singer? Not really. [...] Wisely, the gaggle of producers and writers enlisted for the project don't require Hilton to do more than she's capable of, thus making Paris an enjoyable pop romp. [...] Naysayers be damned: Hilton releasing an album does not signal the end of days. Paris won't change the world, but it's good fun."

Leah Greenblatt from Entertainment Weekly gave a mixed review, and described the album as a "candy box well-stocked with NutraSweet melodies", but with lyrics "often both inane and vaguely porny". Sal Cinquemani of Slant Magazine stated that the album was not bad, and it would likely earn better notices than recent albums by other female artists. However, he criticized the hip hop-influenced tracks. The Observer's Craig McLean remarked that "The heiress's first album might be more than the musical equivalent of the ghostwritten autobiography after all". Randy Lewis from Los Angeles Times thought that Paris "isn't truly awful. [...] With infectious beats and hooky sonic textures established by the hit-laden pros surrounding her, all Hilton has to bring to the party is, well, Paris". However, he criticized her vocals. musicOMH gave a negative review, criticizing the album as a whole, before saying that the parts which "aren't bad" were the bits which did not involve Hilton. Robert Christgau was also negative, giving Paris a "dud" score indicating "a bad record whose details rarely merit further thought."

== Commercial performance ==
In the United States, Paris debuted and peaked at number six on the US Billboard 200, with first-week sales of 77,000 copies. As of October 2013, the album had sold 198,000 copies in the United States. Worldwide, it reached the top 20 on the album charts in New Zealand, Germany, Austria, Finland, Denmark, Sweden, Switzerland, and Canada, and peaked within the top 40 in the United Kingdom, Scotland, Australia, the Netherlands, and Hungary.

== Track listing ==
No.	Title	Writer(s)	Producer(s)	Length
1.	"Turn It Up"	Paris Hilton; Scott Storch; Penelope Magnet; Jeff Bowden	Storch	3:12
2.	"Fightin' Over Me" (featuring Fat Joe and Jadakiss)	Hilton; Storch; Magnet; Fat Joe; Jadakiss; Alonzo Jackson; Taura Jackson	Storch	4:01
3.	"Stars Are Blind"	Fernando Garibay; Sheppard Solomon; Ralph McCarthy	Garibay	3:56
4.	"I Want You"	J. R. Rotem; Kara DioGuardi; Evan "Kidd" Bogart; Barry Gibb	Rotem	3:12
5.	"Jealousy"	Hilton; Storch; DioGuardi	Storch	3:40
6.	"Heartbeat"	Storch; Billy Steinberg; Josh Alexander	Storch	3:43
7.	"Nothing in This World"	Lukasz Gottwald; Solomon	Dr. Luke	3:10
8.	"Screwed"	DioGuardi; Greg Wells	Wells; DioGuardi; Rob Cavallo	3:41
9.	"Not Leaving Without You"	Hilton; DioGuardi; Wells	Wells; DioGuardi	3:35
10.	"Turn You On"	Hilton; Storch; A. Jackson; T. Jackson; Courtney Triggs	Storch	3:06
11.	"Do Ya Think I'm Sexy"	Rod Stewart; Carmine Appice; Duane Hitchings	Storch	4:34
Total length:				39:50

Digital bonus edition bonus tracks
No.	Title	Length
12.	"Stars Are Blind" (The Scumfrog's Extreme Makeover Edit)	4:57
13.	"Turn It Up" (Paul Oakenfold Remix Edit)	4:59
14.	"Turn You On" (Claude Le Gache Le Club Edit)	3:38
Total length:		53:24

Limited edition bonus DVD
No.	Title	Length
1.	"Music Special featuring Making of the Album, Behind the Scenes, and Interviews with Record Producers"	20:21
2.	"Jealousy - In the Studio"	3:25
Total length:		23:46

Additional notes

- "I Want You" contains a sample of "Grease" performed by Frankie Valli.
- "Do Ya Think I'm Sexy" is a cover version of "Da Ya Think I'm Sexy?" performed by Rod Stewart.

== Personnel ==
Performers

- Paris Hilton – vocals
- Fat Joe – vocals
- Jadakiss – vocals
- Penelope Magnet – backing vocals
- Pooh Bear – backing vocals
- Taura "Aura" Jackson – backing vocals
- Jennifer Karr – backing vocals
- Kara DioGuardi – backing vocals
- Keely Pressly – backing vocals
- Niki Haris – backing vocals
- Aaron "Franchise" Fishbein – guitar
- Coley Read – guitar
- Gabriel – guitar
- Ed Calle – saxophone
- Black Violin – strings
- Eric Jorgensen – trombone
- Lee Thornburg – trumpet
- Dr. Luke – various instruments

Production

- Paris Hilton – executive producer
- Scott Storch – executive producer, producer
- Tom Whalley – executive producer
- J.R. Rotem – producer, mixing
- Dr. Luke – producer
- Greg Wells – producer
- Rob Cavallo – producer
- Fernando Garibay – producer, programming, engineer
- Alonzo Jackson – producer
- Penelope Magnet – producer
- Taura "Aura" Jackson – producer
- Sheppard Solomon – producer
- Jennifer Karr – arrangement
- Kara DioGuardi – arrangement, producer
- Chris "Crown-One" Brown – engineer
- Conrad Golding – engineer
- Eric Weaver – engineer, recording
- Nikolas "Niko Don" Marzouca – engineer
- Wayne "The Brain" Allison – engineer
- John Hanes – engineer (ProTools)
- Aniella Gottwald – assistant engineer
- Tony Maserati – mixing
- Neeraj Khajanchi – assistant mix engineer
- Serban Ghenea – mixing
- Tim Roberts – assistant mix engineer
- Jake Davies – recording
- Matt Beckley – recording
- Chris Steffen – recording
- Michael Lattanzi – recording
- Brian Gardner – mastering
- Jeffrey Kent Ayeroff – art direction
- Matt Taylor – art direction, design
- Anthony Mandler – photography
- James White – photography

Credits adapted from the album's liner notes.

== Charts ==
Chart (2006)	Peak position
Australian Albums (ARIA)	24
Austrian Albums (Ö3 Austria)	9
Belgian Albums (Ultratop Flanders)	18
Belgian Albums (Ultratop Wallonia)	49
Canadian Albums (Billboard)	4
Croatian International Albums (HDU)	11
Danish Albums (Hitlisten)	20
Dutch Albums (Album Top 100)	28
Finnish Albums (Suomen virallinen lista)	17
French Albums (SNEP)	67
German Albums (Offizielle Top 100)	18
Hungarian Albums (MAHASZ)	40
Irish Albums (IRMA)	27
Italian Albums (FIMI)	22
Japanese Albums (Oricon)	8
New Zealand Albums (RMNZ)	16
Scottish Albums (Official Charts)	27
Spanish Albums (Promusicae)	98
Swedish Albums (Sverigetopplistan)	6
Swiss Albums (Schweizer Hitparade)	7
Taiwanese Albums (Five Music)	4
UK Albums (Official Charts)	29
US Billboard 200	6

== Sales ==
Sales for "Paris"
Region	Certification	Certified units/sales
South Korea	—	3,061
United States	—	198,000

== Release history ==
Release dates and formats for Paris
Region	Date	Format	Label	Ref.
Various	August 14, 2006	Streaming	Warner Bros	
Various	August 22, 2006	CD	Warner Bros	
