= Get Together (Madonna song) =

2006 single by Madonna

Single by Madonna

from the album Confessions on a Dance Floor
- B-side: "I Love New York"
- Released: May 30, 2006
- Studio: Stuart Price's home (London, England)
- Genre: Electropop; trance; techno
- Length: 5:15 (album version); 3:58 (radio edit)
- Label: Warner Bros.
- Songwriters: Madonna; Anders Bagge; Peer Åström; Stuart Price
- Producers: Madonna; Stuart Price

Madonna singles chronology
"Sorry" (2006)	"Get Together" (2006)	"Jump" (2006)

Music videos
- "Get Together" on YouTube; "Get Together" (European version) on YouTube

"Get Together" is a song by American singer Madonna from her tenth studio album, Confessions on a Dance Floor (2005). The song was written and produced by both Madonna and Stuart Price, with additional writing by Anders Bagge and Peer Åström. It was released in the United States as the third single from the album on May 30, 2006, by Warner Bros. Records. The decision was spurred by the fact that the song was the third most downloaded song from the album, following its previous singles. The song was also released to coincide with the start of Madonna's Confessions Tour. It is a disco-influenced electropop, trance and techno song which lyrically talks about the possibility of finding love on the dancefloor.

Upon release, "Get Together" received generally positive reviews by music critics, with some appreciating its production, while others were underwhelmed. The song reached the top 10 in countries like Canada, the United Kingdom, and Italy, while topping the charts in Hungary and Spain. However, in the US, the song failed to match the same success as it did not enter the official Billboard Hot 100 chart, only peaking at six on the Bubbling Under Hot 100 Singles chart due to low radio airplay.

Two music videos were created for the song, featuring Madonna's performance of the song at London's Koko Club, but they were animated to make it different visually. The videos showed Madonna singing the song amongst graphical visuals portraying volcanoes erupting and a cityscape. The singer performed the song during a promotional tour for Confessions on a Dance Floor and on her 2006 Confessions Tour, and on a number of occasions while promoting her fifteenth studio album Confessions II (2026). In 2007, "Get Together" was nominated in the category of Best Dance/Electronic Recording at the 49th Annual Grammy Awards.

== Background and composition ==
Initially, "Jump" was set to be released as the third single from Confessions on a Dance Floor, following "Hung Up" and "Sorry"; however, it was decided that "Get Together" would be released instead, spurred by the fact that it was the third bestselling digital single from the record. The song's digital sales stood at 20,000 at that time, whereas digital sales for "Jump" were around 9,000. Additionally, "Get Together" was also chosen as the third single to coincide with the start of Madonna's 2006 Confessions Tour. Several remixes of the song, done by DJs such as Tiefschwarz, Danny Howells, and James Holden, were included on versions of the single around the world, released by Warner Bros. Records on May 30, 2006, in the United States and on July 24 in the United Kingdom. Keith Caulfield of Billboard was particularly fond of Danny Howells & Dick Trevor KinkyFunk remix, which "makes over the tune as a snappy, strutting, disco-funk number". The cover artwork for the single features Madonna and her Confessions Tour crew members, including the song's producer Stuart Price. The photo alternatively can also be found on the inlay cover of the I'm Going to Tell You a Secret live album (2006).

"Get Together"
A 31-second audio sample for "Get Together", featuring Madonna singing the lyrics "Do you believe I can make you feel better?" and the chorus over a "tripping" vocal melody.

"Get Together" was written and produced by both Madonna and Price, with additional writing by Anders Bagge and Peer Åström. It is a disco-influenced electropop, trance, and techno song. The track starts with the ringing of an alarm clock, before turning into "an irresistible wave of filtered synths and thumping house beats". The song is set in common time with moderately fast dance groove tempo and a metronome of 126 beats per minute. It is set in the key of C major with Madonna's vocals spanning from A_{3} to A_{4}. The track follows in the chord progression of Em–F–G–Am throughout. Some reviewers noted similarities to Stardust's song "Music Sounds Better with You", which also contains samples of Chaka Khan's song "Fate". One songwriter of the former song, Dominic King, alleged Madonna used the disco riff from the track without permission. King commented he was surprised him and co-writer Frank Musker "didn't get a call", as "it would have been nice to have been asked"; the songwriter said he was "almost certain a discussion about money will happen with her people".

Lyrically, "Get Together" is about the possibility of finding love on the dance floor, with Madonna asking several questions, such as "Do you believe in love at first sight?" and "Do you believe we can change the future?", before asking on its hook, "Can we get together? I really, I really wanna be with you"; she realizes that whether it exists or not, she does not care: "It's an illusion." At the end of the song, she concludes that "If it's bitter at the start then it's sweeter at the end". According to Jason Shawham from About.com, the lyrics comes off as representing a "conversation or an internal dialogue", while for VH1's Christopher Rosa, Madonna "beckons for closer contact with a nighttime lover". Some reviewers also noted an allusion to the S.O.S. Band's 1980 single "Take Your Time (Do It Right)" in the line "Baby we can do it, we can do it all right", whereas Sal Cinquemani of Slant Magazine also observed "subtle nods" to Madonna's own songs like "Holiday" (1983) and "Secret" (1994) in the lyrics. For his part, Nick Levine, in an article for NME, opined that the lyrical content of "Get Together" captures the "thrill of going out dancing and maybe hooking with someone just as effortlessly as 'Into the Groove' did two decades earlier."

== Critical response ==
"On 'Get Together', she delivers not just one of her own finest dancefloor communications but the most blissfully egalitarian electro since Stardust's 'Music Sounds Better With You'. Producer, Stuart Price, makes audible the sensation of synapses pumping serotonin in an uncontrolled rush as Madonna adopts her finest dead-eyed, paper-thin vocal, circa 'Into the Groove'. It's her best track in years, and somehow, deliciously subversive in its stylish and empty pop hedonism."

— James Poletti from Yahoo! Launch talking about the song.

Upon release, "Get Together" was met with generally positive responses from music critics. Keith Caulfield from Billboard complimented the song's "enlightment" theme, while calling it a "hypnotic space-age thumper" in a separate review for the single. David Browne from Entertainment Weekly said that it was fluid in nature and called Madonna a "restless soul aching to connect" in the song. Cinquemani commented that the song as an "evidence of Madonna's previous talent of turning clichés into pop slogans". Peter S. Scholtes from City Pages shared a similar sentiment, writing those lyrics will "carve its slow-burn mark on your mind's dance floor whether 'Get Together' gets you out there or not, and no matter how clichéd those phrases read in print". Stephen M. Deusner of Pitchfork wrote: "On 'Get Together', as Price's synths ebb and flow moodily, Madonna asks the eternal question, 'Do you believe in love at first sight?', over a tripping vocal melody." From The Times, Mike Pattenden called it "ebullient", while The Guardian's Alexis Petridis labeled the song's chorus "triumphant". Shawhan also complimented the song by describing it as a "weird and wonderful number".

Joan Morgan of The Village Voice wrote that the momentum of the album "builds rapidly with a seamless transition into the wicked alchemy of 'Get Together', where Madge and Price offer up an irresistible manipulation of rather sweet vocals laced over thumping percussion, seductive synthesizers, and a few subtle soul-claps thrown in for good measure". According to Iain Moffat from Playlouder, "Get Together" is "preposterously anthemic, charging away recklessly with all sort of beat buzzes going on before entering a skippy 'Blinded by the Lights'-like patch and waiting a good four minutes before letting the 303 loose in its entirety". Connor Morris of Cokemachineglow website wrote that it was "the only track worth noting that Price didn't have his hands in, turns throbbing kicks and fizzling synths into what's easily the massive (albeit early) high point of the twelve songs that comprise Confessions". According to the staff of Herald Sun, on paper, Madonna's collaboration with Bagge and Peer "seem[ed] dodgy", as she was "slumming it with people who write hits for all the C-list popstars Madge herself inspired"; however, he found the song "amazing", noting a "huge housey club explosion mixing strings ans swampy beats", and concluding that it had to be a single.

Offering a more negative review, Camille Paglia, writing for Salon, thought that "Madonna is generating many interesting melodic ideas that stay in the mind, as on 'Get Together' or 'Forbidden Love,' but they haven't really been thought through or lived with, and they are often suffocated or undermined by Price's tacky, penny-arcade embellishments". According to Matt Cappiello of the Daily Nexus, the first 30 seconds of "Get Together" sound like "a Real McCoy B-side, or the unreleased demon spawn of La Bouche", with Madonna "ask[ing] her market demographic, 'Do you believe we can change the future?' This is a possibility. But we need to forget about the past first. And we definitely need to forget about those disco synthesizers in the background." For Mark Coppens from Het Nieuwsblad, the track resembles "heavy trance, but doesn't quite make it because Madonna strolls a bit too flat through the song". In 2007, the song was nominated in the category of Best Dance Recording at the 49th Annual Grammy Awards, but lost to Justin Timberlake's 2006 single "SexyBack".

== Commercial performance ==
In the US, "Get Together" failed to chart on the Billboard Hot 100; however, it was able to reach number six on the Bubbling Under Hot 100 Singles, which acts as an extension of the former chart. The song also reached a peak of number 84 on the Pop 100 chart. Its low chart performance in the region was attributed to limited radio airplay, as according to Billboard's Michael Paoletta, "Get Together" had been "all but ignored by pop stations". It was reported that for the week ending July 15, 2006, the single had a radio audience of fewer than 1 million listeners in the US, based on market size and station share. A petition titled "End the Madonna U.S. Radio Boycott" was signed by about 3,300 fans at petitiononline.com, and was addressed to Clear Channel Communications CEO Mark P. Mays; additionally, fans posted messages supporting Madonna on websites such as Entertainment Weekly and VH1, as well as conspiracy theories about why she was not played on radio. On the other hand, the song was a success on Billboard's dance charts, topping the Dance Club Songs and Dance/Mix Show Airplay charts.

In the UK, "Get Together" debuted at seven on the UK Singles Chart in the issue dated July 23, 2006. It also reached the top of the dance chart. According to Music Week magazine, 67,163 copies of the single have been sold in the region as of August 2008, thus becoming Madonna's 59th best selling single in the UK. In mainland Europe, "Get Together" reached the summit in Hungary and Spain. The song also reached the top ten of the charts in Croatia, Finland, Italy, and Scotland. It peaked within the top 40 in countries like Austria, Denmark, France, Germany, Ireland, Netherlands, and Sweden, where it was certified gold by Grammofonleverantörernas förening (GLF) for shipments of 10,000 copies. Across the pan-Eurochart Hot 100 Singles, it reached a peak of number 18. In Australia, "Get Together" entered the charts at its peak of number 13, on the issue dated June 26, 2006.

== Music videos ==
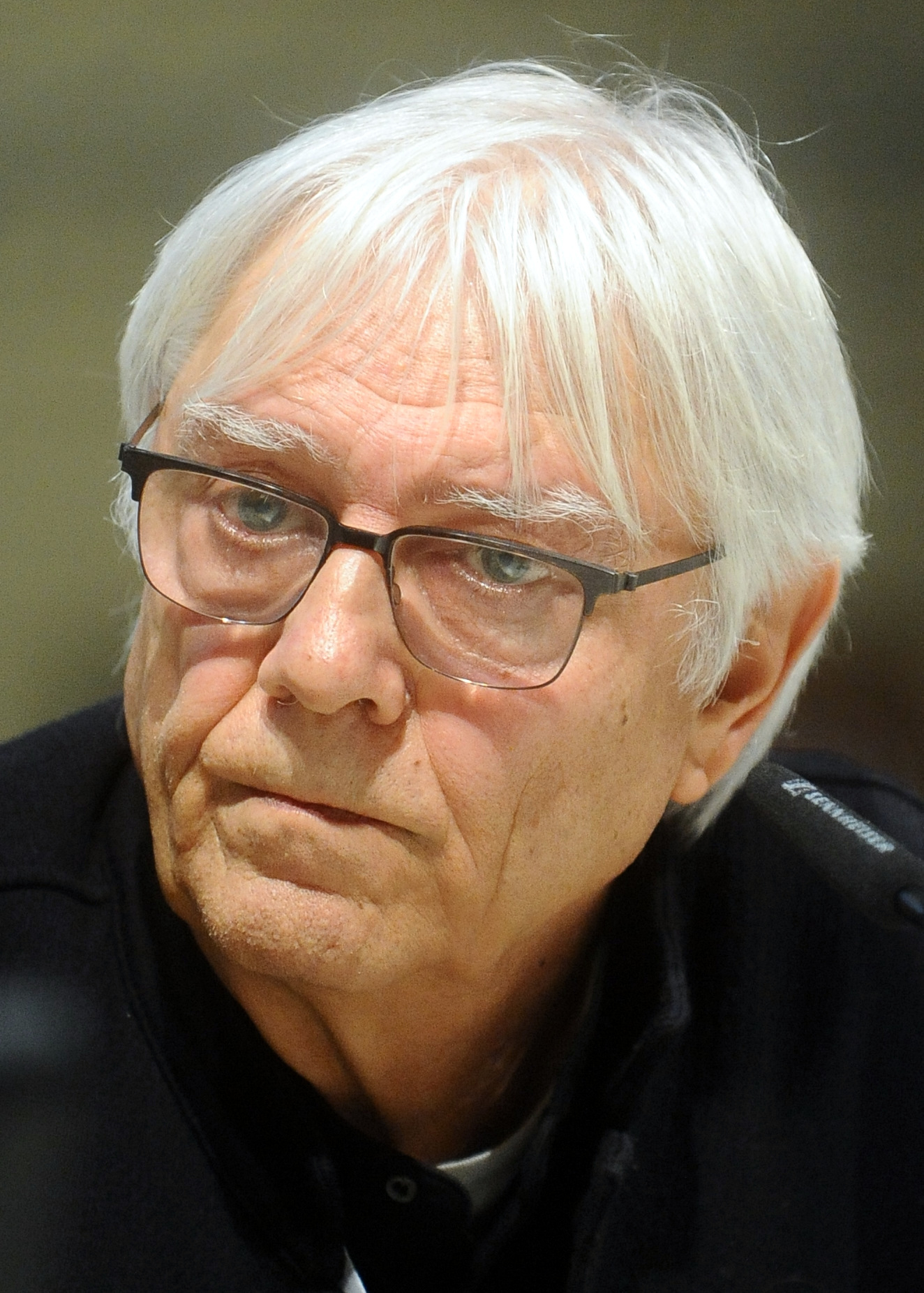
One of the music videos for "Get Together" was inspired by the work of Italian comic-book artist Milo Manara (pictured).

Two music videos were conceptualized for "Get Together". One was directed by Logan Studios and its production team, with animations and designs being done by artist Nathaniel Howe, while the other one was directed by Eugene Riecansky, a rework for the US market into more of a performance animation targeted at clubs. Both videos used Madonna's live performance at the Koko Club in London during her promotional tour for the album. For the former, Howe was contacted by Logan Studios executive producer Kevin Shapiro, and booked as a 3D and 2D animator. The conceptualization and work on the video began on May 1, 2006. It was inspired by the work of Italian comic-book artist Milo Manara and retro science fiction. Different software like Maya, After Effects, and RealFlow were used to bring out the different environments in the video.

While detailing the creative process of the project, Howe explained that during the initial phases of the video, the team was focused on testing different looks in 3D to see how the color, environment, and cinematography complemented the song. While this was happening, the edit of the raw footage was being assembled. As the edit evolved, they narrowed down the techniques and look of the worlds. He commented, "Before we even had picture lock we were dropping in rendered 3D shots; this really allowed us to fine tune both the edit and the effects to work together with the song. As this progressed we regularly sent tests to Warner Bros. and the Madonna camp." Madonna was involved with watching the previews of the work done and passed her comments through Shapiro to the development team. After the fluid effects in the video were completed, Logan and Howe fine-tuned and revisited the shots, and eliminated any discrepancies while incorporating Madonna's comments.

The video, directed by Logan Studios, premiered through VH1's website. It starts showing the world evolving from its genesis with images of volcanoes erupting, dinosaurs, and tidal waves flashing by, until Madonna appears singing the song while standing on a hill accompanied by her two backup dancers. This fluid motion continues up to the intermediate verse when Madonna is shown crawling under the waves and spirals. As the song moves towards the bridge again, the scene changes from the mountains to a cityscape. The singer and her dancers are shown dancing and singing the song on a skyscraper. The video ends with Madonna standing on the building and the camera autofocusing out of the panel. In 2009, the version of the video directed by Riecansky was included on Madonna's compilation, Celebration: The Video Collection.

== Live performances ==
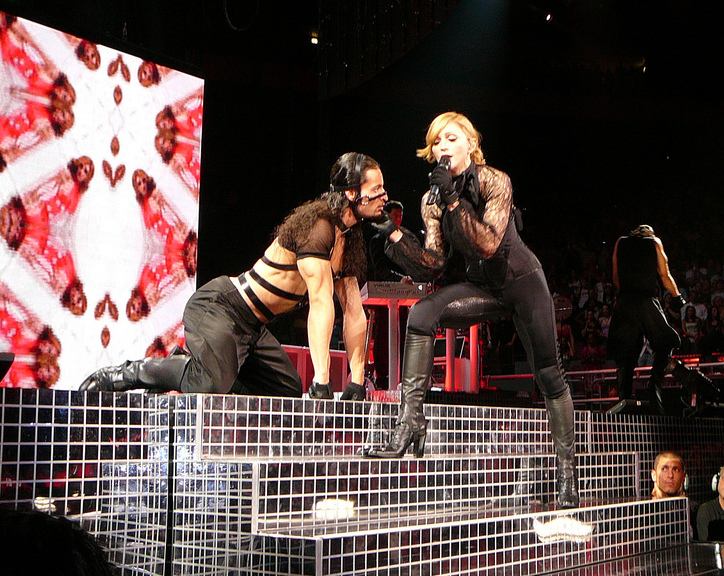
Madonna singing "Get Together" on the Confessions Tour while caressing her dancer, who poses like a horse on the stage

As part of a promotional tour for Confessions on a Dance Floor, Madonna performed "Get Together" on television shows such as Parkinson, Star Academy, and the Children in Need 2005 telethon. Other performances of the song came during concerts at Koko and G-A-Y nightclubs in London, respectively on November 15 and 18, and Studio Coast in Tokyo, Japan on December 7. On April 30, 2006, she also performed "Get Together" as part of her six-song set at the Coachella Valley Music and Arts Festival. The song was also part of the setlist of the 2006 Confessions Tour. Madonna wore a skin-tight, full body black leotard. She performed the song as a red, geometric patterned kaleidoscope shot by Steven Klein appeared on the screens. Madonna was accompanied by two male backup dancers, who posed as if they were horses. During the intermediate musical interlude, the singer moved to the front of the stage and lay down on the screen attached to it. As she continued singing, the music increased and she started to twirl in the center of the stage. The performance ended with Madonna and her dancers moving to the back of the stage singing the words "get together" repeatedly.

According to WalesOnline, Madonna "instantly silenced critics who carp that she can't sing live with pitch-perfect versions of I Feel Love and Get Together". For Rick Massimo of The Providence Journal, the singer punctuated the first songs on the show, including "Get Together", with "dancing that looked, and felt, more like we were watching her work out". Ed Gonzalez of Slant Magazine commented that "a great song like 'Get Together' is splendidly sung" on the concert, saying "whoever tweaks the levels on her mic is a genius"; however, he felt its "celebratory, keep-it-together message is compromised by the contradictory feelings of bondage (oppression) conveyed by having two backup dancers equipped with reins around their heads". For his part, Corey Moss from MTV News considered the performance "offered more of the same". The August 15–16, 2006 performances of "Get Together" at London's Wembley Arena were recorded and included in Madonna's sixth live album, The Confessions Tour (2007).

On April 17, 2026, Madonna joined American singer Sabrina Carpenter during her set at Coachella 2026, where she also performed "Vogue", "Like a Prayer", as well as a duet for her forthcoming fifteenth studio album, Confessions II. Also during the performance, she acknowledged her first appearance 20 years after her debut at the festival, and sang an a cappella snippet of "Get Together". On June 4, 2026, Madonna performed the song during the surprise, free Pride Month concert at The Square in Times Square, for a crowd of over 50,000 people. The concert produced and live streamed by Grindr. It was the first time she performed the full track in 20 years, since the Confessions Tour in 2006. Madonna wore knee-high silver boots, satin blush stockings, and a corset of the same color for the set, and the performance of the song finished when rainbow-colored lighting and images of the 1969 Stonewall riots flashed above the stage, while the crowd cheered.

== Track listings and formats ==
- European and Australian CD single
1. "Get Together" (Radio Edit) – 3:54
2. "Get Together" (Jacques Lu Cont Mix) – 6:18
3. "Get Together" (Tiefschwarz Remix) – 7:34
- UK 12-inch promo vinyl
1. "Get Together" (Tiefschwarz Remix) – 7:34
2. "Get Together" (James Holden Remix) – 8:00
- UK 12-inch vinyl
1. "Get Together" (Radio Edit) – 3:54
2. "Get Together" (Jacques Lu Cont Mix) – 6:18
- European, Canadian and US maxi-CD single
1. "Get Together" (LP Version) – 5:15
2. "Get Together" (Jacques Lu Cont Mix) – 6:18
3. "Get Together" (Danny Howells & Dick Trevor KinkyFunk Mix) – 9:13
4. "Get Together" (Tiefschwarz Remix) – 7:34
5. "Get Together" (James Holden Remix) – 8:00
6. "I Love New York" (Thin White Duke Mix) – 7:43
- UK promo CD single
1. "Get Together" (Radio Edit) – 3:54
2. "Get Together" (Jacques Lu Cont Vocal Edit) – 4:22
3. "Get Together" (Danny Howells & Dick Trevor KinkyFunk Mix) – 9:13
- UK CD 1
1. "Get Together" (Radio Edit) – 3:54
2. "Get Together" (Jacques Lu Cont Vocal Edit) – 4:22
- UK CD 2
1. "Get Together" (LP Version) – 5:15
2. "Get Together" (Jacques Lu Cont Mix) – 6:18
3. "Get Together" (Danny Howells & Dick Trevor KinkyFunk Mix) – 9:13
4. "Get Together" (Tiefschwarz Remix) – 7:34
5. "Get Together" (James Holden Remix) – 8:00
- US 2× 12-inch vinyl
1. "Get Together" (LP Version) – 5:15
2. "Get Together" (Jacques Lu Cont Mix) – 6:18
3. "Get Together" (Tiefschwarz Remix) – 7:34
4. "I Love New York" (Thin White Duke Mix) – 7:43
5. "Get Together" (James Holden Remix) – 8:00
6. "Get Together" (Danny Howells & Dick Trevor KinkyFunk Mix) – 9:13
- Digital single
1. "Get Together" (Album Version) – 5:15
2. "Get Together" (Jacques Lu Cont Mix) – 6:18
3. "Get Together" (Danny Howells & Dick Trevor KinkyFunk Mix) – 9:10
4. "Get Together" (Tiefschwarz Remix) – 7:34
5. "Get Together" (James Holden Remix) – 8:01
6. "I Love New York" (Thin White Duke Mix) – 7:43

== Credits and personnel ==
Credits adapted from the album's liner notes.

- Madonna – songwriter, lead vocals, producer
- Stuart Price – songwriter, producer, recording at Shirland Road
- Anders Bagge – songwriter
- Peer Åström – songwriter
- Mark "Spike" Stent – audio mixing
- Alex Droomgole – assistant engineer
- David Emery – second assistant engineer
- Brian "Big Bass" Gardner – mastering

== Charts ==
=== Weekly charts ===
Weekly chart performance for "Get Together"
Chart (2006)	Peak position
Australia (ARIA)	13
Australian Dance (ARIA)	3
Austria (Ö3 Austria Top 40)	35
Belgium (Ultratop 50 Flanders)	22
Belgium (Ultratop 50 Wallonia)	33
Brazil (Crowley Broadcast Analysis)	25
Canada CHR/Top 40 (Radio & Records)	27
Canada Hot AC (Radio & Records)	38
CIS (TopHit)	32
Croatia International Airplay (HRT)	4
Czech Republic Airplay (ČNS IFPI)	13
Denmark (Tracklisten)	12
European Hot 100 Singles (Billboard)	18
Finland (Suomen virallinen lista)	6
France (SNEP)	26
Germany (GfK)	28
Global Dance Songs (Billboard)	2
Greece (IFPI Greece)	11
Hungary (Rádiós Top 40)	25
Hungary (Single Top 40)	1
Ireland (IRMA)	17
Italy (FIMI)	2
Netherlands (Dutch Top 40)	13
Netherlands (Single Top 100)	14
Romania (Romanian Top 100)	21
Russia Airplay (TopHit)	29
Scottish Singles Sales (Official Charts)	6
Slovakia Airplay (ČNS IFPI)	9
Spain (Promusicae)	1
Sweden (Sverigetopplistan)	15
Switzerland (Schweizer Hitparade)	24
UK Singles (Official Charts)	7
UK Dance (Official Charts)	1
US Bubbling Under Hot 100 (Billboard)	6
US Dance Club Songs (Billboard)	1
US Dance Singles Sales (Billboard)	1
US Dance Airplay (Billboard)	1
US Hot Singles Sales (Billboard)	2
US Pop 100 (Billboard)	84
Venezuela Pop Rock (Record Report)	1

=== Year-end charts ===
Year-end chart performance for "Get Together"
Chart (2006)	Position
Australian Dance (ARIA)	21
Belgium (Ultratop 50 Wallonia)	87
Italy (FIMI)	18
Netherlands (Dutch Top 40)	100
Russia Airplay (TopHit)	151
UK Singles (OCC)	158
US Dance Club Play (Billboard)	9
US Hot Dance Airplay (Billboard)	6
US Hot Singles Sales (Billboard)	21

== Certification and sales ==
Certifications and sales for "Get Together"
Region	Certification	Certified units/sales
France	—	17,887
Italy	—	10,000
Sweden (GLF)	Gold	10,000^{^}
United Kingdom	—	67,163
^{^} Shipments figures based on certification alone.

== Release history ==
Release dates and formats for "Get Together"
Region	Date	Format(s)	Label(s)	Ref.
United States	May 30, 2006	Digital EP	Warner Bros.	
United States	June 6, 2006	12-inch vinyl; maxi CD	Warner Bros.	
Germany	June 9, 2006	CD; maxi CD	Warner Music	
France	June 19, 2006	CD; maxi CD	Warner Music	
United Kingdom	July 24, 2006	CD; maxi CD	Warner Music	

== See also ==
- List of number-one singles of 2006 (Spain)
- List of number-one dance singles of 2006 (U.S.)
- List of number-one dance airplay hits of 2006 (U.S.)
