= List of number-one singles of 2006 (Spain) =

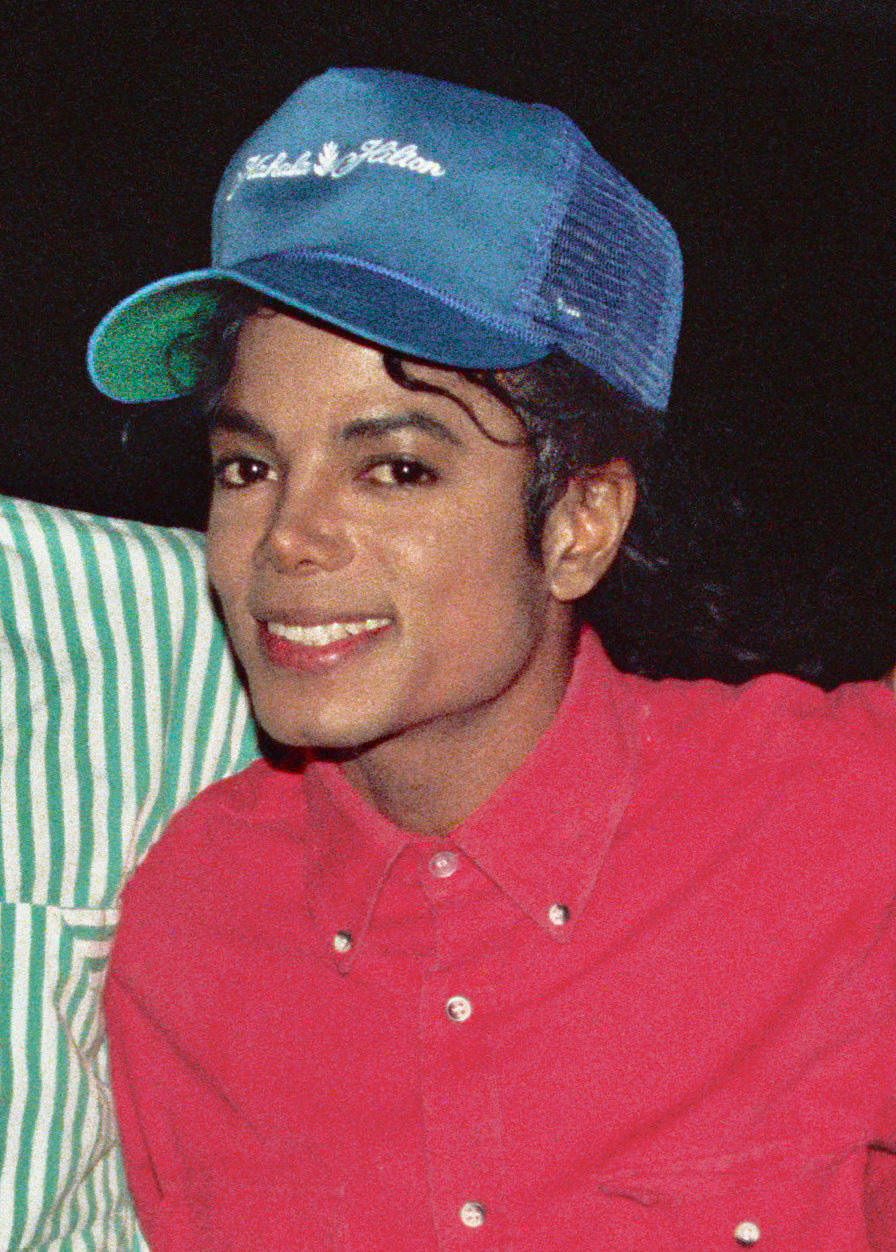
Michael Jackson had fifteen number-one songs during 2006

This is a list of the Spanish PROMUSICAE Top 20 physical Singles number-ones of 2006.

Issue date	Song	Artist
1 January	"Hung Up"	Madonna
8 January	"Hung Up"	Madonna
15 January	"Hung Up"	Madonna
22 January	"Hung Up"	Madonna
29 January	"Rutinas"	Chenoa
5 February	"First Day of My Life"	Melanie C
12 February	"First Day of My Life"	Melanie C
19 February	"Llámalo Perdón"	Estirpe
26 February	"Thriller"	Michael Jackson
5 March	"Sorry"	Madonna
12 March	"Rock with You"	Michael Jackson
19 March	"Billie Jean"	Michael Jackson
26 March	"Beat It"	Michael Jackson
2 April	"Bad"	Michael Jackson
9 April	"The Way You Make Me Feel"	Michael Jackson
16 April	"Dirty Diana"	Michael Jackson
23 April	"Smooth Criminal"	Michael Jackson
30 April	"Leave Me Alone"	Michael Jackson
7 May	"Vivir Para Contarlo"	Violadores Del Verso
14 May	"Vivir Para Contarlo"	Violadores Del Verso
21 May	"Vivir Para Contarlo"	Violadores Del Verso
28 May	"Jam"	Michael Jackson
4 June	"Heal the World"	Michael Jackson
11 June	"You Are Not Alone"	Michael Jackson
18 June	"Earth Song"	Michael Jackson
25 June	"Get Together"	Madonna
2 July	"Stranger in Moscow"	Michael Jackson
9 July	"Blood on the Dance Floor"	Michael Jackson
16 July	"Blood on the Dance Floor"	Michael Jackson
23 July	"Vivir Para Contarlo"	Violadores Del Verso
30 July	"Summerlove"	David Tavaré and U-gene
6 August	"Vivir Para Contarlo"	Violadores Del Verso
13 August	"Vivir Para Contarlo"	Violadores Del Verso
20 August	"The Reincarnation of Benjamin Breeg"	Iron Maiden
27 August	"The Reincarnation of Benjamin Breeg"	Iron Maiden
3 September	"The Reincarnation of Benjamin Breeg"	Iron Maiden
10 September	"Volveremos (himno Eventual Del Real Oviedo)"	Melendi
17 September	"Volveremos (himno Eventual Del Real Oviedo)"	Melendi
24 September	"Let Me Out"	Dover
1 October	"Let Me Out"	Dover
8 October	"Criticar por Criticar"	Fangoria
15 October	"Criticar por Criticar"	Fangoria
22 October	"Criticar por Criticar"	Fangoria
29 October	"Por La Noche"	Mala Rodríguez
5 November	"Martyr"	Depeche Mode
12 November	"The Saints Are Coming"	U2 and Green Day
19 November	"The Saints Are Coming"	U2 and Green Day
26 November	"The Saints Are Coming"	U2 and Green Day
3 December	"The Saints Are Coming"	U2 and Green Day
10 December	"Al Final de la Palmera"	Rafa González-Serna
17 December	"Al Final de la Palmera"	Rafa González-Serna
24 December	"Al Final de la Palmera"	Rafa González-Serna
31 December	"Al Final de la Palmera"	Rafa González-Serna

== See also ==
- 2006 in music
- List of number-one hits in Spain
