= Nothing in This World (Paris Hilton song) =

2006 single by Paris Hilton

Single by Paris Hilton

from the album Paris
- Released: August 28, 2006
- Length: 3:10
- Label: Warner Bros.
- Songwriters: Lukasz Gottwald; Sheppard Solomon
- Producer: Dr. Luke

Paris Hilton singles chronology
"Turn It Up" (2006)	"Nothing in This World" (2006)	"Good Time" (2013)

Music video
- "Nothing in This World" on YouTube

"Nothing in This World" is a song by American media personality and socialite Paris Hilton from her debut studio album Paris (2006). It was released as the third and final single from the album on August 28, 2006, by Warner Bros. Records. The song was written and produced by Lukasz "Dr. Luke" Gottwald, with additional writing by Sheppard Solomon.

== Release and reception ==
Billboard called it "another undeniably catchy, hook-happy midtempo jewel". It was officially sent to Top 40/Mainstream radio in the United States on August 28, 2006. In the United Kingdom, the physical single was released on November 6, 2006, with the single being possible to download a week earlier. The single made number 12 on the US Billboard Hot Dance Club Play chart.

== Music video ==
The music video for "Nothing in This World" was shot by Scott Speer in Los Angeles on September 5 and 6, 2006, in South Pasadena and Long Beach Polytechnic High School, California. In this video, Hilton parodies teen flick The Girl Next Door with her own mock movie trailer in which she plays a sexy starlet loved and adored by an incessantly teased, teenage neighbour (played by Nick Lane). Elisha Cuthbert, the original Girl star, makes a cameo and also with an early appearance of actor/model Scott Elrod as the boyfriend. The video premiered on September 22 as an AOL First View, and premiered in Canada on MuchMusic. The video is also popular on YouTube, having received more than 15.5 million views. The video also spent 7 weeks on the VH1 Top 20 Video Countdown, where it peaked at number 5 during its fourth week.

== Track listing ==
- Digital download (Remixes)
1. "Nothing in This World" — 3:12
2. "Nothing in This World" (Jason Nevins Radio Remix) — 3:15
3. "Nothing in This World" (Kaskade Radio Remix) — 3:33
4. "Nothing in This World" (Dave Audé Radio Edit) — 3:55
5. "Nothing in This World" (Exacta Remix Edit) — 4:57
- US CD single
1. "Nothing in This World" (Jason Nevins Radio Remix) — 3:13
2. "Nothing in This World" (Jason Nevins Extended Remix) — 6:06
3. "Nothing in This World" (Jason Nevins Dub) — 8:12
4. "Nothing in This World" (Dave Audé Vocal) — 7:55
5. "Nothing in This World" (Dave Aude Mixshow) — 6:01
6. "Nothing in This World" (Kaskade Remix) — 6:58
7. "Nothing in This World" (Kaskade Dub) — 6:19
8. "Nothing in This World" (Kaskade Radio Remix) — 3:31
9. "Nothing in This World" (Exacta Remix) — 7:08
- German CD single
1. "Nothing in This World" (Album Version) — 3:10
2. "Nothing in This World" (Jason Nevins Radio Remix) — 3:13
3. "Nothing in This World" (Kaskade Remix) — 6:58
4. "Nothing in This World" (Dave Aude Mixshow) — 6:01

== Charts ==
Chart (2006)	Peak position
Australia (ARIA)	32
Belgium (Ultratop 50 Flanders)	46
Belgium (Ultratip Bubbling Under Wallonia)	7
Finland (Suomen virallinen lista)	7
Germany (GfK)	34
Ireland (IRMA)	38
Netherlands (Dutch Top 40 Tipparade)	8
Netherlands (Single Top 100)	84
Scotland Singles (Official Charts)	27
Sweden (Sverigetopplistan)	36
Switzerland (Schweizer Hitparade)	61
UK Singles (Official Charts)	55
US Dance Club Songs (Billboard)	12
Venezuela Pop Rock (Record Report)	6

== Release history ==
Release dates and formats for "Nothing in This World"
Region	Date	Format(s)	Label	Ref(s).
United States	August 28, 2006	Contemporary hit radio	Warner Bros.	
United States	October 10, 2006	Digital download	Warner Bros.	
Germany	October 27, 2006	CD	Warner Bros.	
Australia	October 30, 2006	CD	Warner Bros.	
United States	October 31, 2006	CD; 12-inch vinyl	Warner Bros.	
United Kingdom	November 6, 2006	CD	Warner Bros.	
