= Stars Are Blind =

2006 single by Paris Hilton

Single by Paris Hilton

from the album Paris
- Released: June 5, 2006
- Genre: Pop; reggae fusion; R&B
- Length: 3:56
- Label: Warner Bros.
- Songwriters: Fernando Garibay; Sheppard Solomon; Ralph McCarthy
- Producers: Fernando Garibay; Sheppard Solomon

Paris Hilton singles chronology
"Stars Are Blind" (2006)	"Turn It Up" (2006)

Music video
- "Stars Are Blind " on YouTube

"Stars Are Blind" is the debut single recorded by American media personality and singer Paris Hilton for her debut studio album, Paris (2006). It was released as the lead single from the album on June 5, 2006, by Warner Bros. Records. The song was written by Fernando Garibay, Sheppard Solomon and Ralph McCarthy, and produced by Garibay with additional production by Solomon. Jennifer Karr was the vocal arranger and background vocalist for the song.

"Stars Are Blind" was well received by music critics. It debuted and peaked at number 18 on the US Billboard Hot 100 due to strong digital sales, and topped the Billboard Dance Club Play chart. Worldwide, the single topped the charts in Hungary, Scotland, and Slovakia, and reached the top 10 in Australia, Canada, Venezuela, and more than 10 European countries. Hilton released an "updated" version, titled as "Stars Are Blind (Paris' Version)", on December 30, 2022, which was followed by another version featuring German singer Kim Petras on May 31, 2023.

== Music video ==
The accompanying music video for "Stars Are Blind" was shot in two days in May 2006, in Malibu, California, and was directed by Chris Applebaum. The video for the song features many images of her walking and rolling around on the beach with a lover. It premiered on June 6, 2006, on MTV. Hilton later posted the video on her official YouTube channel in August 2006. "Shooting the music video was so much fun, and I had the best time doing it, and was so proud when it came out and everyone loved it so much", said Hilton. The video was listed as one of the 50 worst videos of all time by NME at number 49. The magazine stated, "So this is what you can do when your daddy has buckets of money — pay someone to film you roll around in a bikini in the sand with a guy in order to distract us from the fact that you've been auto-tuned (quite poorly) to high heaven. Good on you, Paris Hilton — you successfully created something that sucked more than the song itself (which, frankly, we thought would be impossible to do).

A second version of the video was shot for the European and Latin American countries, featuring Hilton's lover (played by Lucas Babin) from the beach as her photographer at a photoshoot. In this version, which is entirely in black and white, scenes from the beach are still present, but exist as Hilton's fantasies during the photoshoot. At the end of the video, she wins the affection of her photographer, but ends up just taking his keys and stealing his car. The second version premiered on Z100's website on July 5, 2006.

== Critical response ==
"Stars Are Blind" received favorable reviews from music critics. Stephen Thomas Erlewine from AllMusic called it "a breezy track". Sal Cinquemani from Slant says that "Paris's debut single, 'Stars Are Blind' (which was commissioned to bridge the gap between the hip-hop and rock-inflected tunes on the album), has been the surprise of the summer, Nelly Furtado's 'Promiscuous' notwithstanding; it's a sunny, reggae-hued love song that has eclipsed new singles by some of music's biggest stars". Leah Greenblatt from Entertainment Weekly called it "a summery island groove". Alexis Petridis from The Guardian said that "on 'Stars Are Blind', the combination of tinny cod-reggae and your-call-is-being-held-in-a-queue vocal technique results in something so plasticky, it's perversely enjoyable". Mark Daniels from Yahoo! Music said, "Even the plinky pop-reggae, never a good look, of single 'Stars Are Blind' manages to ingratiate itself eventually". Ernest Baker from Complex listed the song as one of the "50 Awesome Guilty Pleasure Songs We're Ashamed to Like (But Not Really)", and stated that "the song was like a tropical escape from her tabloid headline persona. Instead, you had what seemed liked sincere emotions from the socialite incorporated into a ridiculously well-written record, over spot-on production. 'Stars Are Blind' was a flash in the pan, a fluke, but an incredible one. We'll never get something like this from Paris Hilton again". He finished saying that this was Hilton's greatest contribution to society.

== Legal controversy ==
In June 2007, the copyright holders of the 1970 song "Kingston Town", Sparta Florida Music Group, started legal action against Hilton and Warner Chappell Music for plagiarism due to alleged similarities between "Stars Are Blind" and "Kingston Town". The two songs use the same chord progression in the verses. It has wrongly been ascribed that UB40 was the suing party, but that has been denied by the band themselves on their website. The suit appears to have been settled out of court.

== Covers and versions ==
Upon its original release, several remix compilations were released. Among these included a Tracy Young remix and a collaboration with Wisin & Yandel. The song reached the top of the Dance Club Play chart. Hilton's friend, German singer Kim Petras, performed a cover of the song and posted it online. An updated version of the song, "Stars Are Blind (Paris' Version)", was released exclusively to Amazon Music on December 30, 2022. A version featuring Petras was also released.

== Track listing ==
- Digital download
1. "Stars Are Blind" — 3:56
- Digital download (U.S. maxi single)
1. "Stars Are Blind" (Luny Tunes Remix featuring Wisin and Yandel) — 4:16
2. "Stars Are Blind" (Chus & Ceballos Stereo Remix) [Edit] — 4:53
3. "Stars Are Blind" (The Scumfrog's Extreme Makeover Edit) — 4:57
4. "Stars Are Blind" (Tracy Does Paris Club Mix) [Edit] — 4:54
5. "Stars Are Blind" (Tracy Does Paris Dub) [Edit] — 4:58
6. "Stars Are Blind" (Tracy Does Paris Radio Remix) — 3:34
- US CD single
1. "Stars Are Blind" (Luny Tunes Remix featuring Wisin and Yandel) — 4:19
2. "Stars Are Blind" (Tracy Does Paris Club Mix) — 9:12
3. "Stars Are Blind" (Chus & Ceballos Stereo Remix) — 8:13
4. "Stars Are Blind" (The Scumfrog's Extreme Makeover) — 9:00
5. "Stars Are Blind" (Tracy Does Paris Mixshow) — 6:46
6. "Stars Are Blind" (Tracy Does Paris Radio Remix) — 3:34
- US 12-inch vinyl
1. "Stars Are Blind" (Tracy Does Paris Club Mix) — 9:12
2. "Stars Are Blind" (Luny Tunes Remix featuring Wisin and Yandel) — 4:19
3. "Stars Are Blind" (Chus & Ceballos Stereo Remix) — 8:13
4. "Stars Are Blind" (The Scumfrog's Extreme Makeover) — 9:00
5. "Stars Are Blind" (Chus & Ceballos Stereo Dub) — 8:31
6. "Stars Are Blind" (Tracy Does Paris Dub) — 6:21
- Canadian and German CD single
1. "Stars Are Blind" — 3:57
2. "Stars Are Blind" (Luny Tunes Remix featuring Wisin and Yandel) — 4:19
3. "Stars Are Blind" (Tracy Does Paris Club Mix) — 9:12
4. "Stars Are Blind" (Chus & Ceballos Stereo Remix) — 8:13
5. "Stars Are Blind" (The Scumfrog's Extreme Makeover) — 9:00
- UK CD single 1
1. "Stars Are Blind" — 3:57
2. "Stars Are Blind" (Tracy Does Paris Radio Remix) — 3:34
- UK CD single 2
1. "Stars Are Blind" — 3:57
2. "Stars Are Blind" (Luny Tunes Remix featuring Wisin and Yandel) — 4:19
3. "Stars Are Blind" (Tracy Does Paris Club Mix) — 9:12
4. "Stars Are Blind" (Chus & Ceballos Stereo Remix) — 8:13
5. "Stars Are Blind" (The Scumfrog's Extreme Makeover) — 9:00
6. "Stars Are Blind" (Video)
- UK 12-inch picture disc
1. "Stars Are Blind" — 3:57
2. "Stars Are Blind" (Tracy Does Paris Radio Remix) — 3:34
3. "Stars Are Blind" (Chus & Ceballos Stereo Remix) — 8:13
- Japanese CD single
1. "Stars Are Blind" — 3:57
2. "Stars Are Blind" (Chus & Ceballos Stereo Remix) — 8:13

== Charts ==
=== Weekly charts ===
Chart (2006)	Peak position
Australia (ARIA)	7
Austria (Ö3 Austria Top 40)	3
Belgium (Ultratop 50 Flanders)	18
Belgium (Ultratop 50 Wallonia)	28
Canada Digital Song Sales (Billboard)	4
Canada CHR/Pop Top 40 (Radio & Records)	13
Canada CHR/Top 40 (Billboard)	13
CIS (TopHit)	50
Croatia (HRT)	9
Czech Republic Airplay (ČNS IFPI)	6
Denmark (Tracklisten)	5
Europe (Eurochart Hot 100)	5
Finland (Suomen virallinen lista)	6
France (SNEP)	34
Germany (GfK)	7
Hungary (Rádiós Top 40)	7
Hungary (Single Top 40)	1
Ireland (IRMA)	4
Italy (FIMI)	5
Netherlands (Dutch Top 40)	12
Netherlands (Single Top 100)	20
New Zealand (Recorded Music NZ)	12
Norway (VG-lista)	6
Romania (Romanian Top 100)	10
Russia Airplay (TopHit)	44
Scottish Singles Sales (Official Charts)	1
Slovakia Airplay (ČNS IFPI)	1
Sweden (Sverigetopplistan)	3
Switzerland (Schweizer Hitparade)	5
UK Singles (Official Charts)	5
US Billboard Hot 100	18
US Dance Club Songs (Billboard)	1
US Dance Singles Sales (Billboard)	1
US Dance Airplay (Billboard)	8
US Pop Airplay (Billboard)	16
Venezuela Pop Rock (Record Report)	2

=== Year-end charts ===
Chart (2006)	Position
Australia (ARIA)	77
Austria (Ö3 Austria Top 40)	41
Belgium (Ultratop 50 Flanders)	67
Europe (Eurochart Hot 100)	86
Germany (Media Control GfK)	56
Hungary (Rádiós Top 40)	86
Italy (FIMI)	31
Netherlands (Dutch Top 40)	96
Netherlands (Single Top 100)	98
Romania (Romanian Top 100)	41
Russia Airplay (TopHit)	173
Sweden (Hitlistan)	35
Switzerland (Schweizer Hitparade)	35
UK Singles (OCC)	122
US Dance Club Play (Billboard)	11

== Certifications ==
Region	Certification	Certified units/sales
Denmark (IFPI Danmark)	Gold	4,000^{^}
Italy	—	10,000
Sweden (GLF)	Gold	10,000^{^}
United Kingdom	—	102,000
United States (RIAA)	Gold	559,000
^{^} Shipments figures based on certification alone.

== Release history ==
Release dates and formats for "Stars Are Blind"
Region	Date	Format(s)	Label	Ref(s).
United States	June 5, 2006	Digital download	Warner Bros.	
United States	June 6, 2006	Contemporary hit radio	Warner Bros.	
United States	June 27, 2006	Digital download	Warner Bros.	
Germany	July 7, 2006	CD	Warner Bros.	
Australia	July 10, 2006	CD	Warner Bros.	
Canada	July 18, 2006	CD	Warner Bros.	
United States	July 18, 2006	CD; 12-inch vinyl	Warner Bros.	
United Kingdom	July 31, 2006	CD	Warner Bros.	
Japan	August 23, 2006	CD	Warner Bros.	
