= Sorry (Madonna song) =

2006 single by Madonna

Single by Madonna

from the album Confessions on a Dance Floor
- Language: English; French; Spanish; Dutch; Italian; Japanese; Hindi; Polish; Hebrew
- B-side: "Let It Will Be"
- Released: February 6, 2006
- Studio: Stuart Price's home (London, England)
- Genre: Dance-pop; disco
- Length: 4:43 (album version); 3:58 (radio edit)
- Label: Warner Bros.
- Songwriters: Madonna; Stuart Price
- Producers: Madonna; Stuart Price

Madonna singles chronology
"Hung Up" (2005)	"Sorry" (2006)	"Get Together" (2006)

Music video
- "Sorry" on YouTube

"Sorry" is a song by American singer Madonna from her tenth studio album, Confessions on a Dance Floor (2005). The song was written and produced by both Madonna and Stuart Price. It was released to hot adult contemporary radio stations in the United States as the second single from the album on February 6, 2006, by Warner Bros. Records. The song was later included on Madonna's compilation album, Celebration (2009). One of the first tracks developed for the album, it is a dance-pop and disco song, and lyrically talks about personal empowerment and self-sufficiency. For the single release, remixers such as Pet Shop Boys, Green Velvet, and Paul Oakenfold were enlisted to conceive remixes for the song.

Upon release, "Sorry" received positive reviews from music critics, who deemed it "catchy" and one of the strongest tracks on Confessions on a Dance Floor. Some critics also commented on the song's disco-influenced beats while comparing it to Madonna's older dance songs. The song achieved commercial success, topping the charts in Italy, Spain, Greece, Hungary, Romania, and the United Kingdom, where it became Madonna's twelfth number one single. However, in the United States, the song only managed to reach number 58 on the Billboard Hot 100 chart due to an underplay on radio; nonetheless, it reached the summit of the dance charts.

The accompanying music video for the song was directed by Jamie King and was a continuation from the "Hung Up" music video. It features Madonna and her dancers roaming around a city in a van, dancing on roller skates, and the singer fighting with a group of men in a cage. She performed the song on her 2006 Confessions Tour in a similar theme to that shown in the video. For the tour, an additional video was created as a backdrop for a remix of the track, which depicted political leaders, and scenes of war and destruction.

== Background and release ==
In 2004, after the release of her ninth studio album American Life (2003), Madonna began working on two different musicals: one tentatively called Hello Suckers and the other with Luc Besson, who previously directed the music video for her single "Love Profusion", which would portray her as a woman on her deathbed looking back on her life. Madonna collaborated with Patrick Leonard, Mirwais Ahmadzaï, and Stuart Price to write new songs, and told Price to pen material that sounded like "ABBA on drugs". However, Madonna found herself dissatisfied with the script written by Besson and scrapped it. As she was asked by her record company to compose a new studio album, the singer decided to go with a dance direction for the record, influenced by their work on the musicals.

"Sorry" was one of the first tracks developed for Confessions on a Dance Floor, along with lead single "Hung Up" and "Future Lovers". It was also the one which took the most time to finish because Madonna "thought it was too melodramatic and could never decide when it was right". The songs were developed with a remixed perspective in mind. Madonna commented, "Whenever I make records, I often like the remixes better than the original ones. [...] So I thought, screw that. I'm going to start from that perspective." She promoted the album at the dance party named "Misshapes", held at Luke & Leroy's nightclub in Greenwich Village, and was invited by Junior Sanchez to take over the DJ booth, where she mixed "Hung Up" with "Sorry".

"Sorry" was sent to hot adult contemporary radio stations in the United States on February 6, 2006, by Warner Bros. Records as the second single from Confessions on a Dance Floor; the next day, it was released digitally on the region, as well as in the United Kingdom as an extended play featuring several remixes. The song eventually received a physical release in the UK on February 20, while in the US it was issued eight days later. The single cover was taken by Marcin Kokowski, a fan who photographed the singer during her concert at G-A-Y in 2005. She chose the picture among 80 pictures by several other photographers. Madonna later defined "Sorry" as one of her "most retarded songs" during an interview with Rolling Stone in 2009. It was later included on her compilation album, Celebration (2009).

== Composition and remixes ==
"Sorry"
A 28-second audio sample for "Sorry", featuring the chorus backed by "pumping, filtered synths and disco beats".

"Sorry" was written and produced by both Madonna and Price. Musically, the track mixes dance-pop and disco in its composition. The song is set in common time with a moderately fast dance groove tempo of 132 beats per minute. Composed in the key of C minor, Madonna's vocal range spans from F_{3} to G_{4}. It follows the chord progression of E♭–Cm–A♭–B♭ during the spoken introduction. The range then changes to Fm–Gm-Cm in the chorus, while continuing in A♭–Cm–A♭–Fm in the intermediate verses, ultimately ending in repeated lines of "I've heard it all before". "Sorry" starts off with calm, ballad-esque strings, with Madonna apologizing in several languages, but "soon the pounding drums and '80s-inspired synths kick things into overdrive", as noted by Bianca Gracie from Billboard. Around the 2:44 minute mark, a "cracking noise, like a baseball hitting a bat" is heard, which was used in numerous Price productions, including his remix of Gwen Stefani's 2004 single "What You Waiting For?". A writer for Virgin Media website said that the song's musicscape features an "infectious combo of pumping, filtered synths and disco beats". Some reviewers also noted that the bassline of the song resembles the Jacksons' 1980 song "Can You Feel It".

Lyrically, the song talks about personal empowerment and self-sufficiency. This denoted a shift in focus of Madonna as an artist from her previous songs about supremacy, like "Everybody" (1982), "Vogue" (1990), and "Music" (2000), which were centered around the subject of music itself, as noted by Alan Light from Rolling Stone. According to Billboard's Fred Sahai, the lyrics do not "ask for forgiveness, but rather rejects an apology: 'Please don't say you're sorry/I've heard it all before and I/Can take care of myself.'" On the chorus, Madonna sings "don't explain yourself 'cause talk is cheap, there's more important things than hearing you speak". Jude Rogers from The Guardian deemed the lyrics as "one of her most unforgiving, reprimanding a serial apologist", while author Lucy O'Brien in her book Madonna: Like an Icon (2007) speculated that the song was written after a row with her then-husband Guy Ritchie. Throughout the track, the singer speaks "I'm sorry", "Forgive me", and "I am sad" in a total of eight different languages, including French, Spanish, Italian, Dutch, Hebrew, Hindi, Polish, and Japanese. While all other sentences were referring to someone apologizing, the Dutch sentence used - "Ik ben droevig" - roughly translates to "I am sad" and is a mistranslation, as it is not used to apologize. During an interview on AOL conducted by Red Hot Chili Peppers' vocalist Anthony Kiedis, Madonna justified the usage of other languages on the song by saying that "everything sounds better in another language".

For the single release, several remixers were enlisted to remix the track. English duo the Pet Shop Boys were one of them, as they were cited as one of the inspirations for Confessions on a Dance Floor; it consisted of additional vocals provided by member Neil Tennant saying "I'm sorry… so sorry" and "please forgive me". The duo and Madonna had always mutually admired each other, from the time they wrote the song "Heart" (1988) for Madonna but never delivered it. As Tennant had always wanted to sing a duet with Madonna, he added his own vocals to the song, to which she replied, "That was really cheeky of you but it worked." According to O'Brien on The Quietus, the remix "echoes Giorgio Moroder's work with Donna Summer on 'I Feel Love', where Summer's voice became the robot in the mix"; she also thought, "The Pet Shop Boys re-imagined her and in so doing created a disco classic." In another review for The Guardian, she wrote that the remix "brings out a whole new layer of meaning, emphasising the drama behind Madonna's words", also calling it "thunderous" and "my favorite remix ever". It was later included on Pet Shop Boys' remix album Disco 4 (2007). Other remixers included Green Velvet and Paul Oakenfold. On February 10, 2023, Madonna released a remix in collaboration with Blond:ish, Eran Hersh and Darmon. Following this, an two additional remixes featuring production from Miss Monique and Franky Rizardo were released on July 26, 2023, and August 2, 2023. The overall extended play for the Blondish remixes were released on Madonna's 65th birthday, on August 16, 2023. The EP includes Eran Hersh and Darmon's remix, alongside TIBASKO.

== Critical reception ==
Upon release, "Sorry" was met with positive responses from music critics. Jennifer Vineyard of MTV considered it the "album's strongest track" and that the song "wistfully evokes the sounds of the '80s-era dance clubs that first lofted her toward stardom". According to a review in the BBC's Collective, "New single 'Sorry' states Queen Madge's unapologetic stance, and though the song is wrapped up in relationship sentiment, one cannot help but hear the subtext, perhaps directed at her more savage critics: 'there are more important things than hearing you speak'." Alan Braidwood from BBC Music called the song "lethally catchy". While reviewing Confessions on a Dance Floor, Keith Caulfield from Billboard called the song "springy", and commented that it "should keep fans hung up on Madonna's ability to create instant radio and club classics", sounding "like a smash no matter how you spin it; no need for apologies here" in a separate review for the single. Ben Williams of New York magazine opined that the song is "propelled by a catchy bass melody". According to Stephen M. Deusner from Pitchfork, "The cascades of sound wash directly into 'Sorry', setting up the song's panlingual apologies and shifting bass tectonics." Alexis Petridis from The Guardian referred to the song's chorus as "triumphant", while Rolling Stone's Alan Light classified it as "throbbing".

According to Slant Magazine's Sal Cinquemani, "Sorry" was a "insanely catchy second single that’s destined to become a Madonna classic". Similarly, the staff of E! Online wrote it was "sure to be a future disco anthem". Joan Morgan from The Village Voice newspaper, in a review of Confessions on a Dance Floor, wrote: "The party continues admirably with the multilingual, kick-your-man-to-the-curb 'Sorry'." Jon Pareles of The New York Times felt that the first half of the album consists of love songs, happy and sad, and included "Sorry" into the mix. According to Caryn Ganz from Spin, Price transformed the track into a "bouncy talk-to-the-hand groovefest". Thomas Inksweep from Stylus Magazine commented that "Sorry" and "Hung Up" may not be as sleazy as Madonna's initial singles "Burning Up" (1983) or "Physical Attraction" (1983), but they have the same modus operandi of being designed for all-night dancing. Johnny Davis of Q magazine said "Sorry" is catchier than "Hung Up", while the staff of Herald Sun newspaper called it Madonna's "most popstatic single" since "Ray of Light" (1998) as well as "brilliant dance-influenced pop, this will be unavoidable once the album is released". Het Nieuwsblad's Mark Coppens also complimented the song, calling it "fantastic" and "catchy, even though you could label it 'flat dance.'"

Retrospective reviews also have been positive. A group of writers of Gay Times magazine wrote that "Sorry had a tough act to follow coming after Hung Up, but it truly stood up on its own". According to Jude Rogers from The Guardian, the track was Madonna's 13th best single, pointing out that "a fabulous ascending-then-descending bassline bolsters one of Madonna's most club-ready songs". On Gay Star News' ranking, the single came in at number 25, with Joe Morgan stating that "when you're the Queen of Pop, you have to make sure your songs translate. Thumping beats and a killer melody makes sense in any language". Slant Magazine ranked "Sorry" as her 31st best single, writing that it was "more ABBA-esque than the ABBA-sampling 'Hung Up'". Entertainment Weekly's Chuck Arnold considered "Sorry" Madonna's 51st best track, commenting, "Madonna doesn't have any reason to apologize for the second single from Confessions on a Dance Floor", as "no matter how many times we've heard it all before, this still causes a commotion". The song came in the 61st position of Parade magazine's list of Madonna's singles, with Samuel R. Murrian writing that Confessions on a Dance Floor "might be the Madonna album with the most inexhaustible replay value", with "Sorry" being one of its highlights. He called it a "thumping, witty kiss-off set in a '70s roller disco".

=== Recognition ===
"Sorry" was considered the third best single of 2006 by Slant Magazine, and was nominated in the categories of PRS Most Performed Work and International Hit of the Year at the 2007 Ivor Novello Awards, eventually winning the latter.

== Commercial performance ==
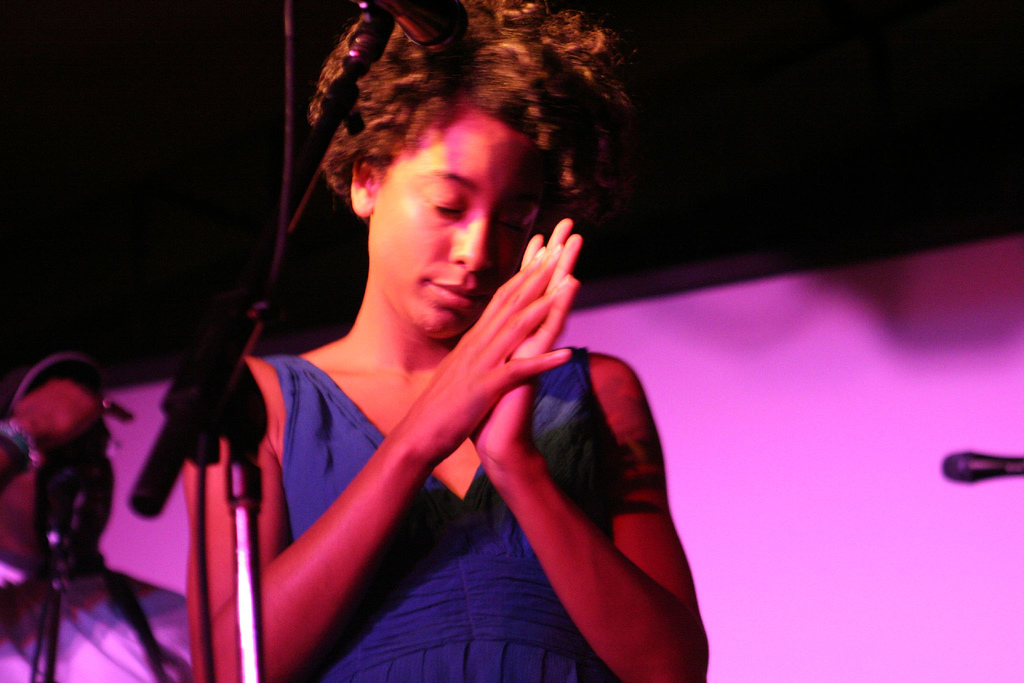
"Sorry" experienced chart success in the United Kingdom, where it debuted at number one on the UK Singles Chart, over Corinne Bailey Rae's (pictured) song "Put Your Records On", which debuted at number two.

In the United States, "Sorry" debuted at number 70 on the Billboard Hot 100 chart for the issue dated March 11, 2006, becoming Madonna's last entry in 24 consecutive charting years, a record by a female artist. The following week, it reached a peak position of number 58 on the Hot 100 and number 46 on the Pop 100 chart. Its low chart performance in the region was attributed to limited radio airplay, as according to Billboard's Michael Paoletta, it was "barely played" there. A petition titled "End the Madonna U.S. Radio Boycott" was signed by about 3,300 fans at petitiononline.com, and was addressed to Clear Channel Communications CEO Mark P. Mays. Additionally, fans posted messages supporting Madonna on Entertainment Weekly and VH1 websites, as well as conspiracy theories about why she was not played on radio. Despite its minimal airplay, the single reached the summit of both the Hot Dance Club Songs and the Dance/Mix Show Airplay charts for two and seven weeks, respectively. As of April 2010, the song has sold 366,000 digital units in the US. "Sorry" was certified platinum by Music Canada (MC) on April 10, 2006, for sales of 80,000 units of paid digital downloads in Canada.

In the United Kingdom, "Sorry" debuted at the top of the UK Singles Chart on February 26, 2006 – for the week ending date March 4, 2006 – surpassing Corinne Bailey Rae's "Put Your Records On" by 10,000 units. The song became Madonna's 12th number one on the UK Singles Chart, as well as the second consecutive single from Confessions on a Dance Floor to reach the top of the chart, after "Hung Up". This made Madonna the female artist with most number one songs in Britain, while placing her in fifth place in overall tabulation. It was listed as the 44th best selling single of 2006 in UK. As of February 2014, the song has sold 200,000 copies, thus becoming Madonna's 30th best selling single in the United Kingdom. It was eventually certified silver by the British Phonographic Industry (BPI) on July 21, 2013.

Elsewhere in Europe, "Sorry" reached the top 10 in several countries, including Austria, Belgium's regions of Flanders and Wallonia, Denmark, Finland, France, Germany, Netherlands, Norway, Sweden, and Switzerland. It reached the top of the charts in Italy, Greece, Romania, and Spain. Across the pan-Eurochart Hot 100 Singles, the song debuted and peaked at number one. In Australia, the single peaked at number four, spending a total of 13 weeks on the chart overall. In New Zealand it was less successful, reaching number 12 and also spending a total of 13 weeks on the chart.

== Music video ==
Scene where Madonna and her female dancers are inside the van restored by MTV UK's show Pimp My Ride for the video

The music video for "Sorry" was directed by Madonna's longtime choreographer Jamie King, who also co-conceptualized her videos for "Human Nature" (1995) and "Don't Tell Me" (2000). It was shot over two days, from January 17–18, 2006, in London. The clip featured choreography from the Talauega Brothers. Madonna wanted the project to be a sequel from the "Hung Up" video, therefore, many of the performers featured in the previous clip were in that of "Sorry". She and all dancers involved had to learn how to roller-skate for the video. "Sorry" was premiered by Channel 4 on February 8, 2006; before its premiere on the channel, the video was edited out to remove a scene where the singer makes an obscene gesture at viewers, upon request by her record company's bosses. However, the unedited version was made available on production designer Marco Puig's website. On March 3, 2006, the clip was digitally released through the iTunes Store, and was later included on Madonna's compilation Celebration: The Video Collection (2009).

The music video features a white van, which was customized on MTV UK's television show Pimp My Ride. The customization was done by Shaun Woodford, owner of auto customization shop; AB Styling, Ltd. in the United Kingdom. Woodford was asked to transform it with disco-themed features, including lilac leather couches, a mirrored disco ball in the ceiling, velvet walls, fake snakeskin columns, and a large stereo system. The work had a total cost of £21,000; according to Woodford, "It was a brilliant experience and by far the biggest job we've ever done - you can't get bigger than Madonna". The special episode titled Pimp Madonna's Ride that chronicled the van from the video aired on February 19, 2006.

The video starts with Madonna standing in front of neon lighted screen in a purple leotard uttering "I'm sorry" in different languages. As the music starts she comes out from the gaming parlour of her "Hung Up" video with the boombox and her three female dancers, leaving the three male dancers, whom Madonna had been passionate with in the previous video, behind protesting. They board a van where Madonna and her dancers strip off their clothes into new ones. As the group move around the city in the van, they pick up different men from the streets to join them. These scenes are interspersed with the scenes of Madonna singing in front of the neon screen. The video progresses like this until the intermediate verse in which Madonna is shown standing in a cage opposite a number of men. As the bridge builds up, Madonna starts fighting with the men. The chorus starts again, and Madonna and everyone else are shown skating in circles around a roller rink. The three male dancers return and join Madonna in doing a dance routine and in a conga line with everyone else. Madonna and her dancers all get back on the van during the outro of the song, leaving the boombox behind on the streets. The video ends with the close-up of Madonna in the purple leotard and fades into her silhouette.

== Live performances ==
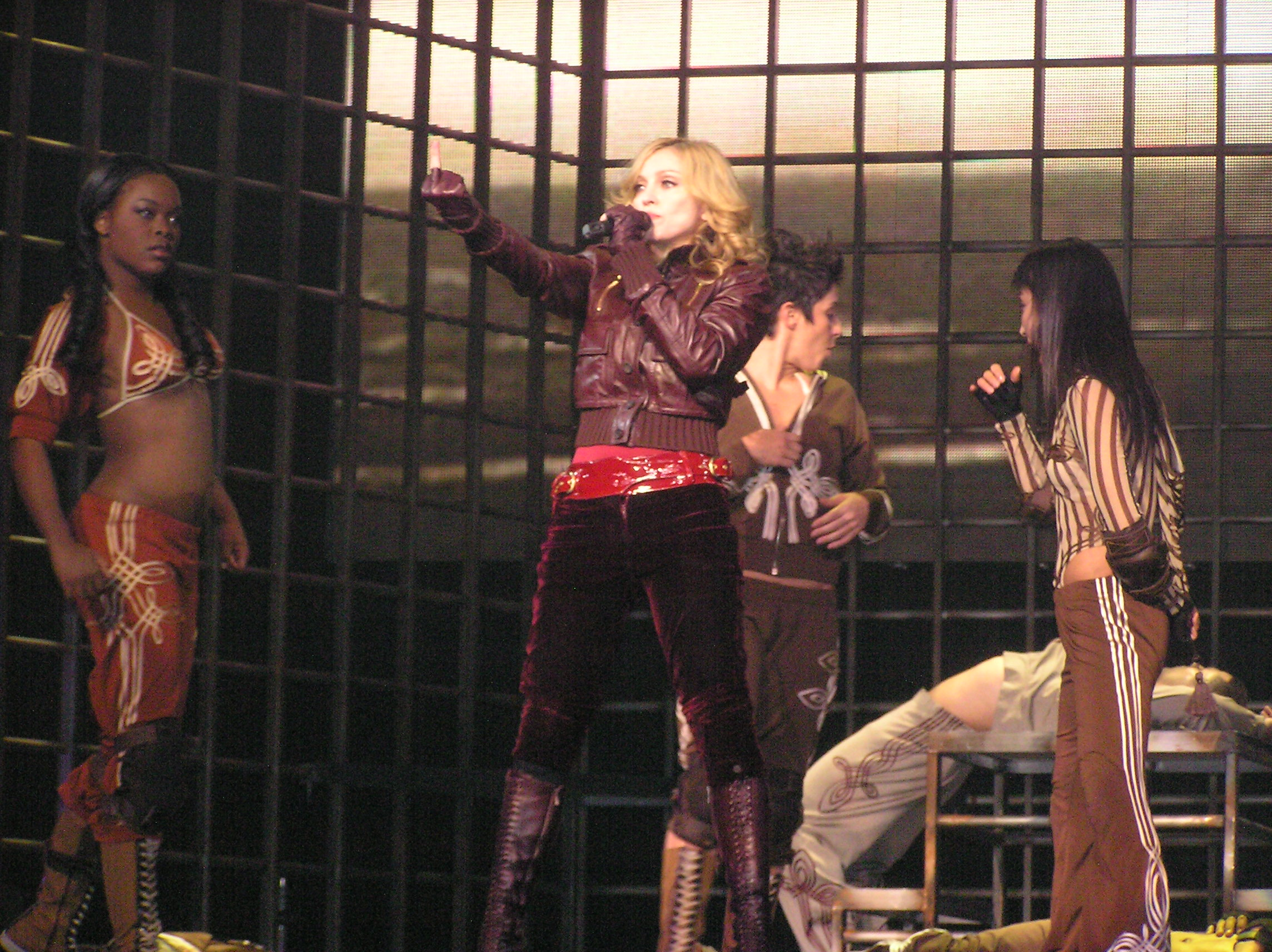
Madonna, surrounded by her dancers, performing "Sorry" on the 2006 Confessions Tour

"Sorry" was performed live by the singer and was used as a video interlude on the 2006 Confessions Tour; both versions appeared in The Confessions Tour CD and DVD, released in 2007. The performance used the Pet Shop Boys remix version and was part of the second segment. As she finished the performance of the song "Isaac", Madonna wore a jacket given to her by the dancers, greeting them one by one. It had a theme of female empowerment, with the singer and her female dancers "tear[ing] up the stage before finally taking down the guys in a West-Side-Story-like showdown of boys vs. girls", as referred by Alan Ilagan from Edge Media Network. Tom Young from BBC Music called the performance a "delight", while Christopher John Treacy of the Boston Herald said "the bitchy house vibe of Sorry had the entire floor jumping in a unified mass". Variety magazine's Phil Gallo observed Madonna transformed the song "into a tour de force from vocals alone". According to the staff of The Philadelphia Inquirer, musically the most successful numbers of the show were "those free of too much high-concept staging and blessed with catchy tunes", such as "Sorry". On a contrary note, Ed Gonzalez from Slant Magazine felt that the performance of the song was not among the concert's highlights.

The song was also used as a video interlude in a remixed form. The video contained images of many political leaders past and present like Adolf Hitler, Idi Amin Dada, George W. Bush, and Tony Blair. Their images flashed across the screen, with text and footage of war atrocities intermingled in between. Madonna appeared on the screens wearing her "Sorry" video leotard, and uttered the words "talk is cheap" and "don't speak", along with the music and Bush's lips stuttering. Christian John Wikane from PopMatters considered it the singer's "massive 'fuck you'" to those leaders, whereas Corey Moss from MTV News wrote that the montage "managed to knock most of the world's leaders". Gonzalez commented that the remix backdrop "feels ecstatic [...] a collage of Godardian weight you can dance too". Young described it as a "lowlight" of the tour. Similarly, Leslie Gray Streeter of The Palm Beach Post considered the interlude "just seemed out of place", while Kitty Empire, writer for The Observer, called Madonna's political points on the show a "little one-dimensional", assuming its message was: "Bad things are bad. Politicians are making them worse. These are easy, woolly points to score." In 2008, the song was performed a capella after a request from the audience on her Sticky & Sweet Tour on November 29 in Mexico City, and December 11 in Santiago. In February 2022, amid the Russo-Ukrainian War, the singer shared an edit of the video, which went viral, through her social media accounts, while expressing support for Ukraine.

== Track listings and formats ==
- US 2× 12" vinyl
1. "Sorry" (Album Version) – 4:42
2. "Sorry" (Man With Guitar Mix) – 7:25
3. "Sorry" (PSB Maxi Mix) – 8:36
4. "Sorry" (Paul Oakenfold Remix) – 7:15
5. "Sorry" (Green Velvet Remix) – 6:06
6. "Let It Will Be" (Paper Faces Remix) – 7:28
- US, European, Australian, and Canadian Maxi-CD
1. "Sorry" (Single Edit) – 3:58
2. "Sorry" (Man With Guitar Edit) – 6:04
3. "Sorry" (PSB Maxi-Mix) – 8:36
4. "Sorry" (Paul Oakenfold Remix) – 7:15
5. "Sorry" (Green Velvet Remix) – 6:07
6. "Let It Will Be" (Paper Faces Vocal Edit) – 5:24
- Japanese CD single, Digital single
1. "Sorry" (Radio Version) – 3:57
2. "Let It Will Be" (Paper Faces Remix) – 7:28
3. "Sorry" (Man With Guitar Mix) – 7:25
- UK 12" vinyl
1. "Sorry" (Album Version) – 4:42
2. "Sorry" (PSB Maxi Mix) – 8:36
3. "Sorry" (Paul Oakenfold Remix) – 7:15
4. "Sorry" (Green Velvet Extended Remix) – 6:07
- UK CD 1, Digital single
1. "Sorry" (Single Edit) – 3:58
2. "Let It Will Be" (Paper Faces Vocal Edit) – 5:24
- UK CD 2
1. "Sorry" (Radio Version) – 3:57
2. "Sorry" (Man With Guitar Mix) – 7:25
3. "Sorry" (PSB Maxi Mix) – 8:34
4. "Sorry" (Paul Oakenfold Remix) – 7:12
5. "Sorry" (Green Velvet Remix) – 6:05
- US CD promo single
1. "Sorry" (Radio Version) – 3:37
- Digital single
1. "Sorry" (Album Version) – 4:41
2. "Sorry" (Man With Guitar Mix) – 7:23
3. "Sorry" (PSB Maxi-Mix) – 8:34
4. "Sorry" (Paul Oakenfold Remix) – 7:12
5. "Sorry" (Green Velvet Remix) – 6:05
- Digital single (DJ Version)
1. "Sorry" (Single Edit) – 3:59
2. "Sorry" (Man With Guitar Edit) – 6:03
3. "Sorry" (PSB Maxi-Mix Edit) – 4:32
4. "Sorry" (Paul Oakenfold Remix Edit) – 5:05
5. "Sorry" (Green Velvet Remix Edit) – 4:32
- Digital single (2023)
1. "Sorry" (Single) (featuring Blond:ish, Eran Hersh & Darmon) – 2:41
- Digital single (2023)
1. "Sorry" (Single) (Miss Monique remix) (featuring Blond:ish, Eran Hersh & Darmon) – 3:07
2. "Sorry" (Single) (featuring Blond:ish, Eran Hersh & Darmon) – 2:41
- Digital single (2023)
1. "Sorry" (Single) (Franky Rizardo remix) (featuring Blond:ish, Eran Hersh & Darmon) – 3:15
2. "Sorry" (Single) (featuring Blond:ish, Eran Hersh & Darmon) – 2:41
- Digital EP (2023)
1. "Sorry" (Single) (Franky Rizardo remix) (featuring Blond:ish, Eran Hersh & Darmon) – 3:15
2. "Sorry" (Single) (Miss Monique remix) (featuring Blond:ish, Eran Hersh & Darmon) – 3:07
3. "Sorry" (Single) (TIBASKO remix) (featuring Blond:ish, Eran Hersh & Darmon) – 3:18
4. "Sorry" (Single) (Eran Hersh & Darmon remix) (featuring Blond:ish, Eran Hersh & Darmon) – 2:41
5. "Sorry" (Single) (featuring Blond:ish, Eran Hersh & Darmon) – 2:41

== Credits and personnel ==
Credits adapted from the album's liner notes.

- Madonna – songwriter, lead vocals, producer
- Stuart Price – songwriter, producer, recording at Shirland Road
- Mark "Spike" Stent – audio mixing
- Alex Droomgole – assistant engineer
- David Emery – second assistant engineer
- Brian "Big Bass" Gardner – mastering

== Charts ==
=== Weekly charts ===
Weekly chart performance for "Sorry"
Chart (2006)	Peak position
Australia (ARIA)	4
Austria (Ö3 Austria Top 40)	8
Belgium (Ultratop 50 Flanders)	8
Belgium (Ultratop 50 Wallonia)	4
Brazil (Crowley Broadcast Analysis)	45
Canada Digital Song Sales (Billboard)	2
Canada CHR/Pop Top 30 (Radio & Records)	8
Canada Hot AC (Radio & Records)	4
CIS Airplay (TopHit)	4
Czech Republic Airplay (ČNS IFPI)	2
Denmark (Tracklisten)	3
European Hot 100 Singles (Billboard)	1
Finland (Suomen virallinen lista)	3
France (SNEP)	5
Germany (GfK)	5
Germany Airplay (BVMI)	1
Global Dance Songs (Billboard)	1
Greece (IFPI)	1
Hungary (Rádiós Top 40)	1
Hungary (Dance Top 40)	1
Ireland (IRMA)	5
Italy (FIMI)	1
Japan (Oricon)	192
Netherlands (Dutch Top 40)	2
Netherlands (Single Top 100)	2
New Zealand (Recorded Music NZ)	12
Norway (VG-lista)	2
Romania (Romanian Top 100)	1
Russia Airplay (TopHit)	4
Scottish Singles Sales (Official Charts)	1
Slovakia Airplay (ČNS IFPI)	66
Spain (Promusicae)	1
Sweden (Sverigetopplistan)	7
Switzerland (Schweizer Hitparade)	4
Ukraine Airplay (TopHit)	58
UK Singles (Official Charts)	1
UK Dance (Official Charts)	1
US Billboard Hot 100	58
US Adult Pop Airplay (Billboard)	36
US Dance Club Songs (Billboard)	1
US Dance Singles Sales (Billboard)	1
US Dance Airplay (Billboard)	1
US Pop 100 (Billboard)	47

Weekly chart performance
Chart (2026)	Peak position
Finland Airplay (Radiosoittolista)	90

=== Year-end charts ===
Year-end chart performance for "Sorry"
Chart (2006)	Position
Australia (ARIA)	78
Australia Dance (ARIA)	8
Austria (Ö3 Austria Top 40)	60
Belgium (Ultratop 50 Flanders)	47
Belgium (Ultratop 50 Wallonia)	38
Brazil (Crowley Broadcast Analysis)	74
CIS (Tophit)	24
European Hot 100 Singles (Billboard)	18
France (SNEP)	55
Germany (Media Control GfK)	73
Greece (IFPI)	16
Hungary (Rádiós Top 40)	5
Italy (FIMI)	4
Netherlands (Dutch Top 40)	31
Netherlands (Single Top 100)	45
Romania (Romanian Top 100)	11
Russia Airplay (TopHit)	23
Sweden (Hitlistan)	80
Switzerland (Schweizer Hitparade)	33
UK Singles (OCC)	44
US Dance Club Play (Billboard)	6
US Hot Dance Airplay (Billboard)	2

=== Decade-end charts ===
Decade-end chart performance for "Sorry"
Chart (2000–2009)	Position
US Dance Club Songs (Billboard)	19

== Certifications and sales ==
Certifications and sales for "Sorry"
Region	Certification	Certified units/sales
Canada (Music Canada)	Gold	10,000^{*}
Denmark (IFPI Danmark)	Platinum	8,000^{^}
Italy	—	15,000
Sweden (GLF)	Platinum	20,000^{^}
United Kingdom (BPI)	Silver	200,000^{^}
United States	—	366,000
^{*} Sales figures based on certification alone.^{^} Shipments figures based on certification alone.

== Release history ==
Release dates and formats for "Sorry"
Region	Date	Format(s)	Label(s)	Ref.
United States	February 6, 2006	Hot adult contemporary radio	Warner Bros.	
United Kingdom	February 7, 2006	Digital download	Warner Bros.	
United States	February 7, 2006	Contemporary hit radio; digital download (EP)	Warner Bros.	
Germany	February 17, 2006	CD; maxi CD	Warner Music	
United Kingdom	February 20, 2006	CD; maxi CD	Warner Bros.	
Japan	February 22, 2006	CD	Warner Music	
United States	February 28, 2006	12-inch vinyl; maxi CD	Warner Bros.	
Australia	March 6, 2006	Maxi CD	Warner Music	
France	March 6, 2006	12-inch vinyl	Warner Music	

== See also ==
- List of number-one hits of 2006 (Italy)
- List of European number-one hits of 2006
- List of number-one singles of 2006 (Spain)
- List of number-one dance singles of 2006 (U.S.)
- List of number-one dance airplay hits of 2006 (U.S.)
- List of Romanian Top 100 number ones of the 2000s
- List of UK Singles Chart number ones (2006)
