= Jeff Bowden =

American football player and coach (born 1959)

Biographical details
- Born: December 30, 1959 (age 66); Morgantown, West Virginia, U.S.

Playing career
- 1979–1982: Florida State
- Position: Wide receiver

Coaching career (HC unless noted)
- 1983–1984: Salem (WR)
- 1985: Salem (OC)
- 1986: Florida State (GA)
- 1987–1990: Samford (OC)
- 1991–1993: Southern Miss (WR)
- 1994–2000: Florida State (WR)
- 2001–2006: Florida State (OC)
- 2009–2011: North Alabama (WR)
- 2012–2018: Akron (ST/WR)

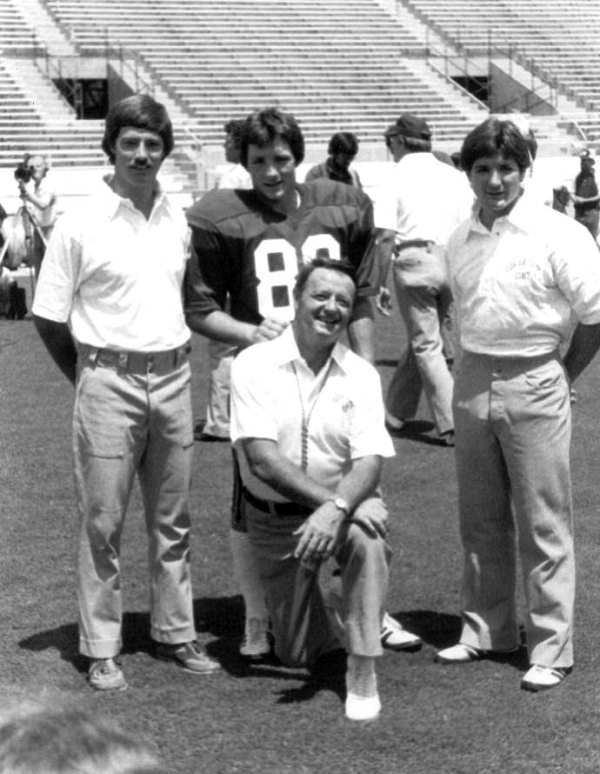
Football coach Bobby Bowden and his sons in 1982: Tommy, Jeff (center) and Terry

Jeff Bowden (/ˈbaʊdən/; born December 30, 1959) is an American college football coach. He served as the special teams coordinator and the outside wide receivers coach at Akron. Before that he served as the offensive coordinator for the Florida State Seminoles under his father and head coach Bobby Bowden. He resigned from that position on November 14, 2006, following a shutout loss to Wake Forest three days earlier. He has also been a wide receivers coach and coached at Salem College, Samford University and Southern Miss. Bowden played wide receiver at Florida State from 1981 until 1982.

== Coaching career ==
Bowden started to coach immediately after he graduated when he was hired as the wide receivers coach at Salem College (now known as Salem International University) in 1983, where his brother Terry Bowden was the head coach. After two years, he was promoted to the position of offensive coordinator. He then returned to FSU, his alma mater, for a season as a graduate assistant coach. In 1987, he began a four-year stint as offensive coordinator at Samford University, again under big brother and head coach Terry Bowden. Bowden then moved up to the Division I-A level as wide receivers coach at Southern Mississippi for three years before being hired by his father at Florida State in 1994 as wide receivers coach. He was promoted to offensive coordinator in 2001 when Mark Richt departed for the head coaching position at Georgia.

Jeff Bowden's choice as offensive coordinator was often criticized as nepotism (Bowden has worked for his father or brother in 31 of his 34 years as a football coach). The offense struggled during the younger Bowden's career and after years of frustration the Seminoles were shut out at home by Wake Forest. Days later, a deal was struck for Jeff Bowden to step down. As a part of Jeff Bowden's agreement with Florida State and Seminole Boosters, Inc. (the Florida State athletic booster organization), he received an $107,500 annually, or $537,000 total, through August 2012 from the Booster club.
