= House Is Not a Home =

Single by Deborah Cox
- Released: September 13, 2005
- Genre: Dance-pop; R&B
- Length: 3:54
- Label: Nervous
- Songwriter(s): Frank Buonadonna, Dina M. Schmidt

Deborah Cox singles chronology
"Easy as Life" (2004)	"House Is Not a Home" (2005)	"Everybody Dance (Clap Your Hands)" (2007)

"House Is Not a Home" is a song recorded and written by Canadian singer Deborah Cox. Released as a single on September 13, 2005, the track became her ninth number one hit on Billboard's Dance Club Songs chart.

== Track listings ==
Digital EP
No.	Title	Length
1.	"House Is Not a Home" (Radio Edit)	3:54
2.	"House Is Not a Home" (Extended Radio Edit)	3:57
3.	"House Is Not a Home" (Radio Instrumental)	4:07
4.	"House Is Not a Home" (Club Mix)	5:13
5.	"House Is Not a Home" (Club Instrumental)	5:13

== Charts ==
=== Weekly charts ===
Chart (2005–06)	Peak position
US Dance Club Songs (Billboard)	1

=== Year-end charts ===
Chart (2006)	Position
US Dance Club Songs (Billboard)	2
