= Gastineau =

Gastineau may refer to:

== People ==
- Brittny Gastineau (born 1982), American reality show personnality
- Henry Gastineau (1791–1876), English engraver and painter
- Lisa Gastineau (born 1959), American reality show personnality
- Mark Gastineau (born 1956), American football player
- Nathalie Gastineau (born 1981), French canoeist

== Other uses ==
- Alaska-Gastineau Mine, Alaska, USA
- Gastineau Channel, Alaska, USA
- The Gastineau Girls, an American reality series
- Gastineau Peak, a mountain in Juneau, Alaska, USA
- Gastineau Range, a small mountain range in British Columbia, Canada

== See also ==
- Gatineau (disambiguation)
