= Paris Hilton's My New BFF season 1 =

Paris Hilton's My New BFF
- Season 1
- Starring: Paris Hilton
- No. of episodes: 10

Release
- Original network: MTV
- Original release: September 30 – December 2, 2008

Season chronology
- Next → Season 2

The first season of Paris Hilton's My New BFF aired from September 30 to December 2, 2008, on MTV in the United States, and consists of 10 episodes and 4 specials.

== Season overview ==
Prior to production, a website was set up for potential contestants to submit their videos on why they should be Paris' BFF, and casting sessions were also set up. Initially, the 18 people with the highest votes from other users would go on the show. However, the ten contestants with the most votes went on while the other eight were selected by the producers.

Sixteen women and two men competed in challenges in an attempt to become Hilton's new best friend. Four of the female contestants were eliminated in the first episode and hence did not feature in promotional material (photo shoots, TV spots or even the opening credits) for the season. Guest stars included Benji Madden, Kyle Richards, Richie Rich, Traver Rains, Kathy Hilton, Fergie, Simple Plan, Chris Applebaum, Perez Hilton, Dirt Nasty, Allison Melnick, Ryan Seacrest, Nicky Hilton, Keyshia Cole, Jeff Beacher and Nick Swardson.

Though Hilton was forbidden from revealing the winner before the season finale aired, she had on two separate occasions accidentally referred to the winner as "she" —first on the September 25, 2008 airing of the Late Show with David Letterman, and again on the October 7, 2008 airing of The Ellen DeGeneres Show. On December 2, 2008, it was revealed in the finale that Brittany Flickinger had won the contest.

== Contestants ==
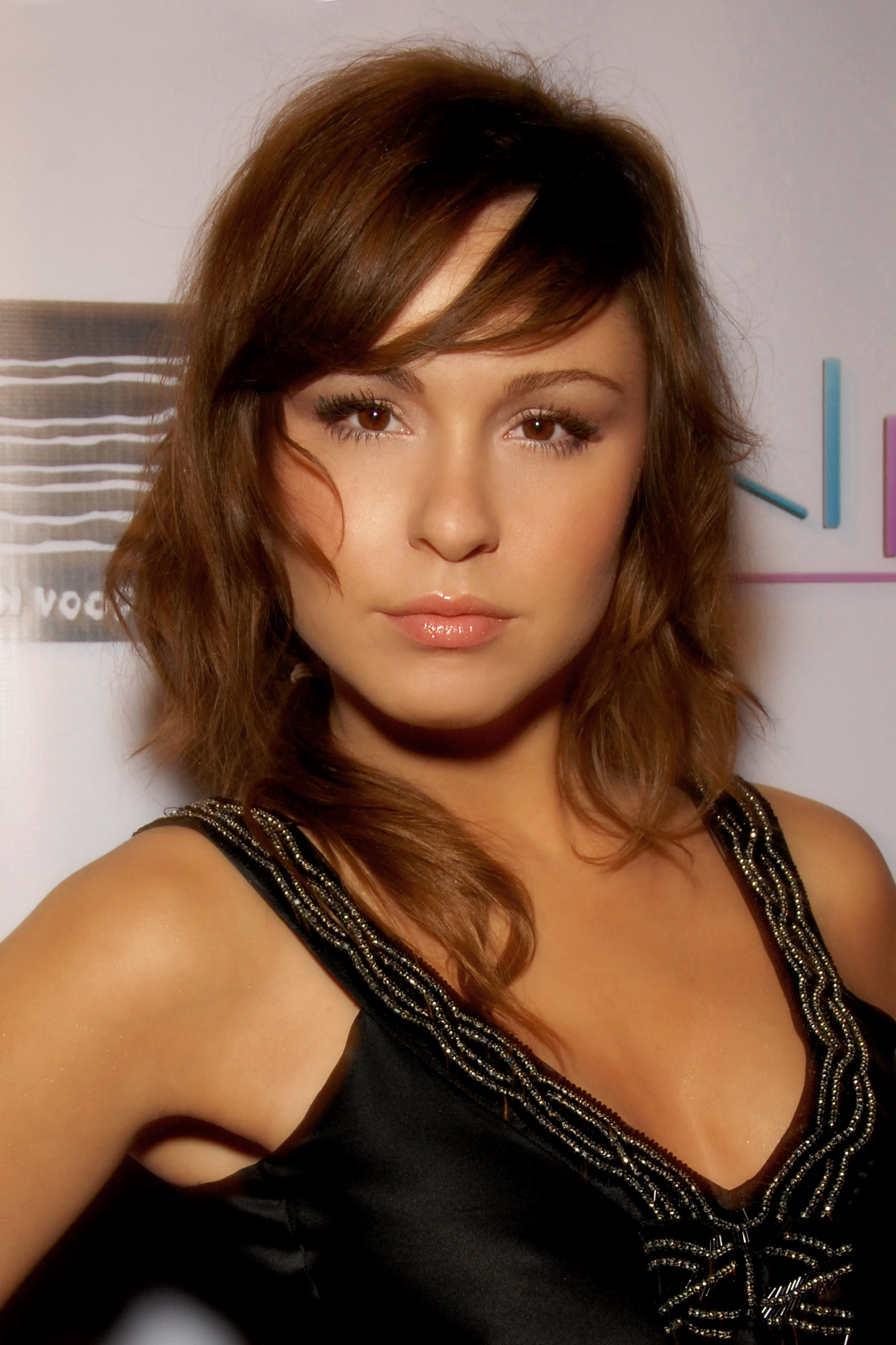
Paris Hilton's New BFF season one winner Brittany Flickinger in 2009

Rank	Name	Episode eliminated
1	Brittany Flickinger	Winner on December 2, 2008.
2	Vanessa Fontana	Episode 10
3	Corrie Loftin	Episode 9
4	Shelley Burkett	Episode 9
5	Lauren Stone	Episode 8
6	Kayley Gable	Episode 7
7	Kiki	Episode 6
8	Natasha Komis	Episode 5
9	Zui Watts	Episode 5
10	Onch	Episode 4
11–12	Bryan Gallagher	Episode 3
11–12	Sinsu Co	Episode 3
13	Baje Fletcher	Episode 2
14	Michelle Kopasz	Episode 1
15–18	Athena Georgiadias	Episode 1
15–18	Erin Newberg	Episode 1
15–18	Francisca Ovalle	Episode 1
15–18	Trisha Hershberger	Episode 1

== Elimination table ==
Contestants	Episodes									
Contestants	1^{[a]}	2	3	4	5^{[b]}	6	7	8^{[c]}	9	10^{[d]}
Pet	Vanessa	Kayley	Brittany		Corrie	N/A	Vanessa	Brittany	N/A	
Brittany	SAFE	SAFE	SAFE	SAFE	LOW	WIN	SAFE	LOW	SAFE	WIN
Vanessa	SAFE	SAFE	SAFE	SAFE	SAFE	SAFE	SAFE	LOW	WIN	ELIM
Shelley	SAFE	LOW	SAFE	WIN	WIN	SAFE	SAFE	LOW	ELIM	
Corrie	SAFE	WIN	SAFE	LOW	SAFE	SAFE	LOW	LOW	ELIM	
Lauren	SAFE	SAFE	WIN	SAFE	SAFE	LOW	SAFE	ELIM		
Kayley	SAFE	SAFE	SAFE	SAFE	LOW	WIN	ELIM			
Kiki	LOW	SAFE	SAFE	SAFE	WIN	ELIM				
Natasha	SAFE	SAFE	LOW	SAFE	ELIM					
Zui	SAFE	SAFE	SAFE	SAFE	ELIM					
Onch	SAFE	WIN	SAFE	ELIM						
Bryan	SAFE	SAFE	ELIM							
Sinsu	SAFE	SAFE	ELIM							
Baje	SAFE	ELIM								
Michelle	ELIM									

^[a] During the first elimination in episode 5, everyone was up for discussion. The contestants shaded in blue and red were up for discussion in the second elimination.
^[b] Beginning in episode 8, every contestant would be up for elimination.
^[c] In episode 10, during elimination Paris left the rooftop where panel was held. Brittany and Vanessa were drove to two different places. Vanessa arrived at a hotel room. There was a note that said she was eliminated.

Key
The contestant became Paris' new BFF.
The contestant won the episode's challenge and was safe from elimination.
The contestant was not eliminated in that episode.
The contestant was in the bottom, replaced with someone else, and therefore was safe.
The contestant was up for elimination, but was safe.
The contestant was eliminated by another contestant.
The contestant was eliminated.
The contestant won the episode's challenge and was up for elimination.

== Episodes ==
No. in season	Title	Original release date	Prod. code
-	"Casting Special"	September 4, 2008	101
14 of the 18 contestants return to the BFF Mansion to discuss their time on the show.
1	"Welcome to the Dollhouse"	September 30, 2008	102
Paris meets and mingles with her BFF potentials. But she wastes no time in making them over and even nixing some ladies. Paris' 18 potential new best friends are sent to Les Deux, where they meet Paris for the first time. The players are later blindfolded and driven to a dark interrogation room, where Jeff Beacher grills them on their deep, dirty secrets. Discovering that first impressions are everything, Trisha, Francisca, Erin, and Athena don’t even make it to the fabulous BFF mansion. They are sent home the very first night. The next morning the remaining contestants are brought to an airport hangar, where Paris attempts to give each contestant a makeover to her own liking. Some change their whole look for Paris, and others question her suggestions. The participants must then show off their new looks on the red carpet. Meanwhile, Vanessa proves her loyalty by telling Paris a secret. Paris chooses Vanessa as the winner of the makeover challenge, and as her first pet, upsetting the other contestants. Michelle and Kiki plead their cases as to why they should be the one to stay, even though they both offended Paris. Kiki stirs up some serious drama, and Michelle is sent home. Discussion: Kiki, Michelle (second elimination) Eliminated: Athena, Erin, Francisca, Trisha (first elimination); Michelle (second elimination)
2	"24 Hour Party Challenge"	October 7, 2008	103
Paris' search for her new BFF continues, and this week Paris is expecting the contestants to step up their game. Whether that means coming out of their shell or reining in their overbearing personalities, each contestant has something to work on to be "Paris-perfect". Paris decides that personalities aside, her potential Besties need to look their hottest at all times, so she opens up a boudoir full of clothing, shoes, and accessories for the contestants to go crazy with. Paris wants to see who can keep up with her and party the longest and hardest. While some contestants cheer and race to the limo, others look a little nervous. Vanessa picks Onch as the winner of the challenge. After a tiring game of man polo, the BFF's head to lunch with Paris' mom, where they are all expected to give toasts. After the speeches, Paris and her mom pick Corrie as the winner. She then picks Shelley and Baje to be up for discussion. Paris holds elimination on the mansion rooftop, and Shelley and Baje are given a chance to state why they should stay, and defend themselves against other contestants opinions of why they should go home. Paris then eliminates Baje from the house. After elimination, Paris brings out a cake for birthday-girl Kayley and lets her know she's the new pet. Discussion: Baje, Shelley Eliminated: Baje
3	"Sayonara!"	October 14, 2008	104
Another week, another challenge. Paris is always faced with the pressure of looking great at all times should the paparazzi catch her in unflattering positions. Her new BFF will be just as big a paparazzi target as her, so she takes all of the contestants to an amusement park to ride rollercoasters and have the photos turn out Paris-perfect. Onch - who is extremely afraid of rollercoasters - gives up after the first ride. Lauren wins the challenge and attends the MTV Movie Awards with Paris. She then takes Natasha, Brittany, Sinsu, and Bryan - the four contestants she didn't get to know that well - to Tokyo with her for the Japanese VMAs. Paris finally gets a good impression of the four and sends party-girl Sinsu and shy-guy Bryan home. Meanwhile, at the BFF Mansion, the drama cranks up when Corrie makes a racist remark about Onch, and Zui makes physical threats against Corrie while defending Onch. It is revealed in episode 4 that Brittany was made the pet. Discussion: Bryan, Natasha, Sinsu Eliminated: Bryan, Sinsu
4	"Who's the Fakest?"	October 21, 2008	105
Perez Hilton, The Queen of All Media is coming to the BFF Mansion to see who the fakest is. Shelley is considered the realest with Corrie at fakest, Onch by her side. Paris does not like have a friend that's fake, saying it won't happen again (hinting she had a friend that's fake) and puts Corrie up for elimination. At the rooftop Paris then says that Onch was second fakest so he's also in elimination. Before that, Onch takes some water and removes his makeup to show Paris his real personality. She finds that very honest and starts to inch toward him, but Corrie pulls her back when saying that they based her fake on her outer personality, not inner. Paris accuses Onch of thinking it's a game, but he replies saying that he is playing a game for her. She then eliminates Onch, and Corrie is chosen as the week's pet. Discussion: Corrie, Onch Eliminated: Onch
5	"You Gotta Have Class"	October 28, 2008	106
Paris is still upset with the other contestants' attitudes toward Corrie, so she puts everyone up for elimination and has Corrie decide who leaves. Karma comes back around, and she eliminates Zui. Later, Paris has the remaining play 7 Minutes in Heaven. Kayley, Natasha, and Brittany are up for elimination for performing the worst in the challenge. Natasha is eliminated. There were two challenges in this episode. The first was a game show, I Heart Paris, to test the contestants on who knew the most about Paris. Kiki wins and goes out to dinner with Paris. Shelley won the 7 Minutes in Heaven challenge and had a sleepover at Paris's house. Paris did not pick a pet in this episode. Discussion: All (first elimination); Brittany, Kayley, Natasha (second elimination) Eliminated: Zui (first elimination); Natasha (second elimination)
6	"Vegas, Baby!"	November 4, 2008	107
Paris takes the remaining besties to Las Vegas with her. Upon arriving, they party hard, get only three hours of sleep, and have intense training for a performance they will have to put on for over 800 people including Paris later. Paris rewards them for their hard work by taking them to the spa, where the first challenge of this episode takes place. She sends fake letters containing (false) rumors to all of the girls. Some laugh it off, some are a little miffed, and Lauren breaks down in tears, having to leave the room. Brittany wins the challenge. Later, at the showgirl performance, Kayley wins the challenge for performing the best, and Kiki routinely screws up and makes it obvious. It is then revealed that she and Lauren are up for discussion. Lauren excuses her behavior by claiming she's on her period, while Kiki smirks during the elimination process. The comments from the BFFs are mixed - Lauren said some rude things to Vanessa and can't break down like she did, and Kiki is rude to almost everyone. Paris makes her decision and sends Kiki home. The remaining girls are in Vegas for one more night, so she instructs the girls to find a boy and take him back to the BFF Mansion. Paris did not pick a pet in this episode. Continued in episode 7. Discussion: Kiki, Lauren Eliminated: Kiki
7	"My Kind of People"	November 11, 2008	108
Continued from episode 6, the girls are back in Vegas finding some boys to bring back to the BFF Mansion. Paris gives the girls another chance on the first night back. Lauren hooks up with a lot of boys, but only one shows up. Brittany and Shelley are left man-less when they're stood up back in L.A. Vanessa wins the challenge for bringing back two boys. For the next challenge, Paris collects some dirt on every remaining BFF from ex-boyfriends and ex-BFFs. Shelley's friend says the only reason she shouldn't be picked is because she will leave Texas with her. The rest of the girls aren't so innocent. Lauren's ex-friend claims that she groped another girl's breasts while comparing sizes. Kayley's ex-boyfriend - whom she cheated on - has plenty of harsh comments to go around. Corrie's ex-friend accuses her of being promiscuous. Brittany's ex-friend Vallon comes to the BFF Mansion unlike the rest which were played on a TV, and she's accused of hooking up with a boy right after her friend broke up with him. Brittany is flustered and gives a sub par excuse but then lies to Paris and says it isn't true. Paris - torn between Brittany, Corrie, and Kayley - puts Corrie up for elimination, as the harsh comments from her ex-friend did not help the fact that the house voted her the fakest in episode 4. Paris orders Vanessa to choose another girl to be up for discussion, and Shelley is picked, as Vanessa feels that Shelley doesn't have a thick skin and will be ripped apart by the media if she becomes Paris's new friend. At elimination, Corrie claims that her ex-friend was jealous because of her beauty. Shelley tells a story of how she was picked on in high school and thus made her a stronger person. In a shocking turn of events, Paris tells Shelley she's safe and makes her switch spots with Kayley, whom she feels will add drama to her life if they become friends. Kayley is then sent home. Discussion: Corrie, Kayley (added to discussion), Shelley (removed from discussion) Eliminated: Kayley
8	"Keep Your Frenemies Close"	November 18, 2008	109
The remaining five contestants have a few visitors! Baje, Onch, Natasha, Kiki, and Kayley have all returned to help out Paris in a very special challenge. The "frienemies" were instructed to give the BFFs makeovers that would reflect how they think each girl would be as a friend to Paris. Nearly all of the girls are made to look horrible (due to either revenge or jealousy), but Shelley - who was partnered with Natasha - wins the challenge for having the best makeover. Vanessa - who was partnered with Kayley (who thought that the girl with the ugliest makeover would win) - lost the challenge despite making Paris laugh hysterically. Last week's pet, Vanessa, must hand over the collar - but not the one she wore in the challenge. Paris tells her to pick a new pet: anyone except Lauren. Vanessa then picks Brittany. The next challenge was to walk out in the middle of town with Paris cut-outs. All the BFFs had to sell photo opportunities with "Paris." Due to all of the money being raised for an animal shelter, Paris refused to reveal the winner of the challenge, but instead put all of the girls up for elimination. Paris then explained Onch had told her that Lauren was hard to work with during the first challenge, so that's why she didn't want her as the pet. Most of the girls had some harsh words to say about Lauren - especially Brittany and Vanessa. Paris then gave Lauren the fatal "TTYN." Eliminated: Lauren
9	"This Friendship is Over"	November 25, 2008	110
The four remaining BFF-hopefuls take a look back on their past 8 weeks in the BFF Mansion. From Bitchy Baje to Two-Faced Lauren, all of the girls got to look back on their stay. Paris takes the girls to her "human lie detector", famous radio host Ryan Seacrest, and has all of the girls interviewed and asked some tough questions. While Shelley (nervously) breezes through her interview and gains Ryan's approval (although he thinks she will get ripped apart in Hollywood), Brittany and Corrie start an interview war, and are accused of being fame leeches and full of themselves, respectively. Ryan thinks that Vanessa is too much of a fan to be best friends with Paris. For the next challenge, Ms. Hilton arranges a one-on-one with the remaining contestants. She lies to all of them and tells them they've been eliminated. What they don't know - besides that they're staying, for now - is that Paris is watching their exit interviews. Vanessa breaks down so much that Paris sheds a few tears, while Shelley seems nonchalant about being eliminated. The girls then realize that they're staying, and Paris decides to eliminate someone for real. Shelley's exit tape made it seem to Paris that she didn't care about their friendship, which hurt the latter's feelings. She is then eliminated. Paris shocks the girls by saying that one more will be leaving - and apparently she found Corrie to be too self-centered to be BFFs, and was sent back to Texas with Shelley. Paris then surprises Brittany and Vanessa with a trip to New York. Eliminated: Corrie, Shelley
-	"Reunion Special"	December 2, 2008	111
12 of the 18 contestants appear once more to chat with Paris and each other about their time spent on the show. The two finalists - Brittany and Vanessa - are hooked up to a lie detector to answer questions that could make or break their friendship with Paris.
10	"Best Friends Forever"	December 2, 2008	112
Brittany and Vanessa travel to New York with Paris to make a final impression on who is BFF material and who isn't. Brittany is taken shopping and then out to eat a $1,000 sundae. Vanessa is given a tour of East Hampton by Paris and then has lunch with Paris on private estate (where she is given a BFF ring), and finally to have a massage and dip in the pool at the spa. They then go to a club where Brittany is also invited. The girls return to L.A. for the final elimination. Both of the girls have to give speeches on why they should be Paris's BFF and why the other shouldn't. Paris flees the rooftop and then has the girls in two cars, to separate locations. One contestant (who turned out to be Vanessa) was taken to a hotel room, where she received a "TTYN" note. The other contestant (who turned out to be Brittany) was taken to a masquerade party where Paris revealed that they became BFFs. Runner-up: Vanessa Winner: Brittany
-	"The Inner Circle"	December 2, 2008	113
Paris's new BFF, Brittany, attends a sleepover with Paris and some of her closest friends.
