= Brittny Gastineau =

American actress

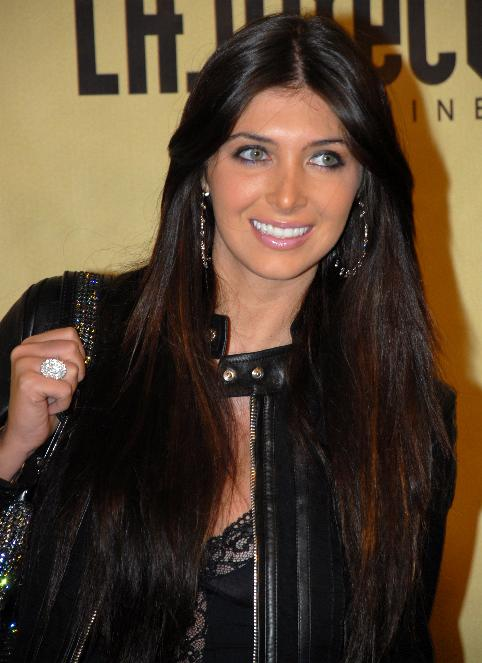
- Gastineau at LA Direct Magazine's "Remember to Give" Holiday Party, December 2007
- Born: November 11, 1982 (age 43); New York City, New York, U.S.
- Occupation(s): Model, socialite, television personality
- Years active: 2004–present
- Parent(s): Mark Gastineau; Lisa D'Amico

Brittny Gastineau (born November 11, 1982) is an American model, socialite, and reality television personality.

== Early life and family ==
Gastineau was born in New York City. She is the daughter of Lisa Gastineau and former New York Jets defensive end Mark Gastineau. During the divorce proceedings between her parents she lived with her grandmother and attended public school at Clarkstown High School North in New City, New York. After graduating from high school she attended the University of Alabama before returning to New York City to model.

== Careers ==
=== Modeling ===
After moving back to Manhattan, Gastineau signed with the Elite Model Management, and became a model as part of their celebrity division. Within weeks of signing with the agency, she appeared in a spread for Stuff magazine. She walked runways for Anne Bowen and Anna Sui during NYC fashion week in 2005, and signed an endorsement deal with L'Oréal Paris, which led to a European advertising campaign. During that time, she became the face of casual wear designer Ed Hardy. Later, Gastineau appeared on the cover of Steppin' Out, Hamptons and Lucire magazines. In 2005, she appeared on Maxim magazine's Hot 100 list, ranking at number 60.

In 2006, she walked the runway for New York Fashion Week, for designer, Yumi Katsura, and then modelled for the designer's bridal collection later that year.

Her modeling career included contracts with MAC cosmetics, as well as occasional runway shows for boutiques such as Heatherette run by Traver Rains and Richie Rich. She also shared a high-end accessory line with her mother, Tresu Glam, and in 2007, they added a costume jewelry line as well.

Gastineau continues to pursue modelling, which includes occasional magazine layouts. She has appeared on the cover of Social Life magazine, and appearances in magazines L.A. Confidential and Life and Style. In 2008 at Fashion Week in NYC, she walked the runway for designer Tamara Pogosian, and was featured in a campaign for Ferrari California in Beverly Hills. She made a small appearance in the movie Bruno where she was duped by the Sacha Cohen character into believing she was on a TV show when in fact, she was the victim of Cohen's role play.

Gastineau made occasional appearances as Kim Kardashian's friend on the E! show Keeping Up with the Kardashians.

=== Entertainment ===
In 2004, Gastineau landed a development deal with the E! Network and began production on a reality series which would also feature her mother Lisa Gastineau, the ex-wife of NFL defensive end Mark Gastineau.

In 2005, the series, eventually dubbed The Gastineau Girls, premiered on February 15 and became a modest hit for The E! Network. The first season chronicled mother and daughter's quest for love in New York City as well as Brittny's formal, successful introduction into the world of modeling. On January 31, 2006, the series' first complete season was released on Region 1 DVD in the United States.

In between seasons of The Gastineau Girls, Gastineau appeared on another E! Network reality show, Filthy Rich: Cattle Drive, which observed the activities of spoiled celebrity children on a Colorado cattle ranch. The show was produced by Joe Simpson, father of Jessica and Ashlee Simpson. Gastineau later appeared on the NBC game show, Identity, and guest hosted episodes of The View and Isaac Mizrahi's talk show. She appeared on Lifetime's Top This Party, E!'s Keeping Up with the Kardashians and MTV's popular programs The Hills and Cribs. She also hosted segments for Fuse TV and Spike TV.

In 2009, Gastineau appeared in a small segment of the movie Brüno where she is asked to judge whether Jamie Lynn Spears should keep or "abort" her unborn baby. Gastineau said to "abort it". Gastineau said she was "joking around" and, in a later interview, said she was aware of the satirical nature of her appearance, saying: "I was just playing along. Anyone who is going to see Bruno knows it's a comedy, and I was totally joking around! I was not serious." She says she's seen the movie and "thought it was amazing." Sacha Baron Cohen, she adds, "is a genius."
