= Paris Hilton's Dubai BFF =

Reality television show

- Starring: Paris Hilton
- Opening theme: "My BFF" by Paris Hilton
- Countries of origin: United States; United Arab Emirates
- No. of seasons: 1
- No. of episodes: 9 (List of episodes)

Production
- Running time: 60 minutes

Original release
- Network: MTV (International); Dubai One
- Release: April 2011 – June 2011 (Europe)

Paris Hilton's Dubai BFF is a reality television series focusing on Paris Hilton as she searches for her new best friend in Dubai. It is the second and last spin-off of Paris Hilton's My New BFF (2008–2009). After a number of delays, the series aired on several MTV stations worldwide in 2011.

== Series overview ==
Partial Dubai BFF cast at press conference

Paris Hilton's Dubai BFF, filmed in the United Arab Emirates, follows Hilton as she puts a group of twenty-three young women from all throughout the world, but currently living in Dubai, through a series of tests to see who would best complement her lifestyle. Hilton had also never been to Dubai before, so part of the show includes her initial reactions to her first trip to the United Arab Emirates. This is the first format of the series not to include any male contestants.

In a fashion similar to Onch during the American version's second season, the show features a co-host. Nayla Al Khaja, a Dubai filmmaker and friend of Hilton's, filled this role. While being an integral part of the show, including during eliminations and providing updates to the contestants, Al Khaja also assisted Hilton as a guide while in the Middle East and also features Mirna Khayat. The series is reported to feature a social event in The BED Lounge, a club in Dubai. Tickets to attend the event were sold freely. On June 12, 2011, it was revealed in the finale that Reem Al Alnezi became Paris Hilton's Dubai BFF.

== Contestants ==
Rank	Country	Name	Episode eliminated
1	(Kuwait)	Reem Al Alnezi	Winner
2–3	(Iraq)	Dana Elemara	Episode 8
2–3	(Qatar)	Dina Altaji	Episode 8
4	(Canada)	Amy Marie Parker	Episode 8
5	(Iran)	Mandy Dabiri	Episode 7
6	(Italy)	Galareh Monajemi	Episode 7
7	(Croatia)	Branka Conda	Episode 6
8	(India)	Farhana Bodi	Episode 5
9	(Lebanon)	Christiane "Christy" Zeitouny	Episode 4
10	(Italy)	Marta Vezzaro	Episode 4
11	(Egypt)	Bassant Shams	Episode 3
12	(Morocco)	Dalila Laaribi	Episode 2
13–24	(Syria)	Alaa "Ally" Alkhalil	Episode 1
13–24	(Lebanon)	Angel Arbid	Episode 1
13–24	(Uzbekistan)	Nagris Khamraeva	Episode 1
13–24	(Canada)	Katra Abdinur	Episode 1
13–24	(Australia)	Monica	Episode 1
13–24	(United Kingdom)	Megan Brooks	Episode 1
13–24	(Russia)	Natalia Kapchuk	Episode 1
13–24	(Pakistan)	Liliya Afridi	Episode 1
13–24	(France)	Celina Batista	Episode 1
13–24	(South Africa)	Tarin Savage	Episode 1
13–24	(United States)	Kelly Haechler	Episode 1
13–24	(United Kingdom)	Yasmin Haring	Episode 1

1. They were eliminated outside of panel.

== Elimination progress ==
Table will be filled in as the season progresses and the announced contestants are eliminated.

Country	Contestants	Rank	Episodes							
Country	Contestants	Rank	1	2	3	4	5	6	7	9
(Kuwait)	Reem Al Alnezi	1st	SAFE	SAFE	SAFE	LOW	SAFE	SAFE	WIN	BFF
(Iraq)	Dana Elemara	2nd	SAFE	SAFE	STAR	WIN	WIN	SAFE	SAFE	TTYS
(Qatar)	Dina Altaji	2nd	SAFE	LOW	WIN	STAR	WIN	SAFE	WIN	TTYS
(Canada)	Amy Marie Parker	4th	SAFE	SAFE	SAFE	SAFE	LOW	LOW	LOW	TTYS
(Iran)	Mandy Dabiri	5th	SAFE	SAFE	SAFE	SAFE	SAFE	SAFE	TTYS	
(Italy)	Gelareh Monajemi	6th	SAFE	SAFE	SAFE	SAFE	STAR	LOW	TTYS	
(Croatia)	Branka Conda	7th	SAFE	WIN	LOW	WIN	SAFE	TTYN		
(India)	Farhana Bodi	8th	SAFE	SAFE	SAFE	LOW	TTYS			
(Lebanon)	Christiane Zeitouny	9th	SAFE	WIN	SAFE	TTYS				
(Italy)	Marta Vezzaro	10th	SAFE	WIN	SAFE	TTYS				
(Egypt)	Bassant Shams	11th	SAFE	STAR	TTYN					
(Morocco)	Dalila Laaribi	12th	SAFE	TTYN						
(Syria)	Alaa Alkhalil	13th	TTYN							
(Lebanon)	Angel Arbid	13th	TTYN							
(Uzbekistan)	Nagris Khamraeva	13th	TTYN							
(Canada)	Katra Abdinur	13th	TTYN							
(Australia)	Monica	13th	TTYN							
(United Kingdom)	Megan Brooks	18th	TTYN							
(Russia)	Natalia Kapchuk	19th	TTYN					BACK		
(Pakistan)	Liliya Afridi	19th	TTYN							
(France)	Celina Batista	19th	TTYN							
(South Africa)	Tarin Savage	19th	TTYN							
(United States)	Kelly Haechler	19th	TTYN							
(United Kingdom)	Yasmin Haring	24th	TTYN							

Key
The contestant are the Little Star and won the challenge.
The contestant was originally put up for discussion, but the decision was reversed, because won the challenge.
The contestant was up for discussion, but was safe.
The contestant is a female and not an Arabic citizen but currently living in Dubai.
The contestant was eliminated.
The contestant was eliminated by Nayla.
The contestant was eliminated outside of panel.
The contestant won the episode's challenge and was safe from elimination.
The contestant was named Paris Hilton's Little Star.
The contestant is guest.
The contestant became Paris' new BFF.
The contestant won the challenge but was put up for discussion
The contestant was the Little Star and was eliminated.
TTYN – Talk To You Never, the goodbye message for eliminated contestants.
TTYS – Talk To You Soon, the goodbye message for eliminated contestants that Paris wants to keep in touch but not be best friends, Just Friends.

Note

- Yasmin, Tarin, Kelly, Liliya, Natalia & Celina was eliminated outside of panel, and was eliminated by Nayla (co-host).
- In Episode 4 has a double elimination first part the bottom 2 was Farhana and Marta; the second part the bottom 2 was Reem and Christy.
- Dana is the second contestant that was in the final without any time in the bottom.
- Amy was the first contestant that was in the bottom most consecutive times (three times).
- Mandy is the first contestant with most "SAFE" status (six times).
- Marta was the first TTYS elimination on this season.

== Production ==
=== Filming ===
Production lasted for seventeen days, beginning in June 2009, and the finale then concluded with a final shoot in Los Angeles. In December 2009, Hilton updated her Twitter saying that she was recording voice-over and interview scenes for the series, and in April 2010, it was reported that she had just her finished work on the series.

=== Cultural difficulties ===
Ziad Batal, Dubai One executive, explained that this version "would have to be compatible with cultural sensitivities as Hilton is known for her wild partying." Ish Entertainment co-founder Michael Hirschhorn expanded on this, explaining that the Dubai production would not be as racy as the American or English editions. Alcohol, normally a reality television staple, did not play a role on this version. Swearing, sexually explicit conversation or risqué clothing were kept to a minimum. The production had to receive several layers of approval before moving forward, and even Sheikh Mohammed bin Rashid Al Maktoum, the ruler of Dubai, had to give his blessing.

=== Delays ===
Legal issues delayed the airing of this version for over a year. While it was originally expected to air in 2010, Lionsgate Television executives claim producers at Uniqon Emirates, LLC signed a written agreement, worth US$8 million, to co-produce and distribute Paris Hilton's Dubai BFF in the Middle East. Uniqon Emirates failed to pay more than US$4.7 million to cover the production and distribution costs and Lionsgate filed a federal suit for breach of contract in U.S. District Court in Los Angeles on February 2, 2010. No official outcome for the suit was announced, but the series failed to air on Dubai One, the announced original network for this version.

== Broadcast ==
After MTV, the original stakeholders for the franchise, assumed worldwide airing rights for Dubai BFF, the series debuted on various MTV networks globally throughout 2011. It aired on MTV Latin America, MTV Australia, MTV UK and Ireland and mainland European MTV stations. However, it did not air in North America.
