= List of Paris Hilton's Dubai BFF episodes =

Paris Hilton's Dubai BFF (2011) is a reality television series as well as the second and last spin-off of Paris Hilton's My New BFF (2008–2009) following Paris Hilton's British Best Friend (2009). The series chronicles 12 contestants living in Dubai competing for a chance to become Paris Hilton's best friend through a series of challenges. A total of 9 episodes were filmed, with Reem Al Alnezi being revealed as the winner in the finale.

== Episodes ==
No.	Title	Original release date	Prod. code
1	"Paris Arrives in Dubai"	April 17, 2011	101
Paris arrives in Dubai and is introduced to 24 contestants, alongside Nayla Al Khaja, a Dubai based film-maker. The premiere introduces the contestants through an interview with Paris and Nayla. Six girls are eliminated from the interviews: Yasmin, Natalia, Celina, Kelly, Tarin and Liliya. The remaining 18 girls are divided into pairs to each perform a group act. Following this, another 6 girls were eliminated: Nagris, Megan, Ally, Monica, Katra and Angel. The 12 finalists moved into the Paris Dubai penthouse. DISCUSSION: No discussion ELIMINATED: Ally, Angel, Celina, Katra, Kelly, Liliya, Megan, Monica, Nagris, Natalia, Tarin and Yasmin
2	"Painting the Camel"	April 24, 2011	102
Paris sends the cntestants to perform a traditional ritual in the desert, that consisted of painting a camel with saffron. Bassant is named 'Little Star of the Week' by Paris. The next challenge entails the contestants creating a commercial for a Paris Hilton branded product. Team 1 impressed Paris and Nayla with their commercial acted out by Branka and Christy, while the other two teams were deemed poor. Bassant, being Paris' 'Little Star' was then asked to select a girl for possible elimination and chose Dina for being 'fake'. This issue fuelled drama at the house, where Dina confronted Bassant. At the discussion panel, Paris chose contestant, Dalila to join Dina for a possible elimination. Paris then eliminated Dalila, and named Dana as the new 'Little Star' for the next week. LITTLE STAR: Bassant (during the episode); Dana (for the next episode) DISCUSSION: Dalila, Dina ELIMINATED: Dalila
3	"Fake or real"	May 1, 2011	103
Paris privately asks the contestants who they believe is genuine and fake. Each contestant is ranked on a scale of least to most fake. The results are revealed and Dana was ranked the least, and Dina the most. Later, Paris announces that she is hosting a party. She rewarded Dana, her 'Little Star' by inviting her to a makeover session in preparation for the event. The next challenge saw the contestants write an autobiography of about 500 words; each contestant is assigned a different theme. Arabic actress and writer, Mirna Hayet, arrived to hear the stories. Several of the girls, including Dina came forward about their troubled pasts and revealed painful memories. Dina was declared winner of the challenge and safe from possible elimination. Paris first selected Branka, as she asked her sincereness and genuinity. Bassant was also selected, and eventually eliminated for being a 'hungry tiger' who was too concerned with fame, rather than being Paris' friend. LITTLE STAR: Dana (during the episode); Dina (for the next episode) DISCUSSION: Branka, Bassant ELIMINATED: Bassant
4	TBA	May 8, 2011	104
At the penthouse, Dina, as Paris' Little Star, was asked to select four girls for her team and they were invited to a surprise pampering session. The remaining girls were instructed to cook and serve the pampered group an "Arabic Fusion" dinner. Following this, the girls were taken to a clothing store where Paris divided the group into five pairs and instructed them to create a look that reflected her busy, international jet-setting lifestyle. One girl from each team then modelled the style in front of Paris, who provided feedback. Reem and Christy's style was declared the worst, whilst the best was Branka and Dana's. Dina, being Paris' Little Star was then invited to spend time with her; she chose Mandy to accompany her. At the discussion panel, Paris picked on Christy and Reem's arguing during the style challenge; this led to a disagreement between the two. Paris then chose Marta and Farhana for discussion. Marta was eliminated. She then surprised the girls with the prospect of a second elimination, selecting Reem for discussion, due to her involvement in arguments and for her impatience. Christy was also selected and then eliminated, as Paris felt she was too fragile. LITTLE STAR: Dina (during the episode); Gelareh (for the next episode) DISCUSSION: (1) Marta, Farhana (2) Reem, Christy ELIMINATED: Marta, Christy
5	TBA	May 15, 2011	105
Paris introduced her bodyguard, Mason, to the girls. He interrogated each one about their potential behaviour in hypothetical situations involving Paris, and if concerned with "fame or fortune" whilst Pars watched. Following the interrogations, Mason was to reveal who he felt was the most genuine girl by "taking a bullet" or saving that contestant from being squirted by a water gun. The next day, the girls were taken to a gold souk shopping centre. Paris divided them into two groups, and each group was given 1,500 DHS to buy the best jewellery item, but at a bargained price for Paris. Each team presented their jewellery piece to Paris at lunch. Paris declared the ring team as winners. After this, the girls were given a challenge of allocating a given tag-line to the most deserving girl. The first was "Most two-faced" which led to a disagreement. When it came to the "Most Hungry Tiger" tag, some girls hinted at Farhana. She refused this and began to defend herself, which Amy disagreed with. The two girls got into a heated argument. At discussion, Paris revealed that Gelareh, her 'Little Star' was immune from elimination. Paris first selected Amy, for her outburst towards Farhana, and secondly, Farhana, who was eliminated. LITTLE STAR: Gelareh (during the episode); Branka (for the next episode) DISCUSSION: Amy, Farhana ELIMINATED: Farhana
6	TBA	May 22, 2011	106
After Farhana's elimination, Paris asked her Little Star, Gelareh, to choose a new Star. She selected Branka. The next day, the girls were to be taken to a party hosted by Paris at the Emirates Palace in Abu Dhabi. Before this, but, each girl was told to write a toast for Paris, which was to be presented at an evening dinner. Seated at the dinner table, Paris walked in with an unexpected guest; her mother, Kathy Hilton. She then asked to hear the toasts, which varied among the girls. After the girls had left the room, Kathy gave Paris her frank opinions. Kathy commented that Branka made the worst impression, feeling that she did not have anything in common with Paris concluding that they would not make good friends. The next day, Paris and the girls were greeted by each girl's BFF. Paris asked each BFF questions to find out more information. Because Reem was the only contestant unable to see her BFF, Paris invited her to a special event, where they could talk privately. The next day Paris instructed her Little Star, Branka, to reveal the girls up for discussion: herself, Amy and Gelareh. The three packed their bags and left the hotel to be driven to separate locations. Amy and Gelareh were taken to different parts of the airport, whilst Branka was told she was eliminated. Amy and Gelareh were surprised with a trip to Beirut, Lebanon. LITTLE STAR: Branka (during the episode); DISCUSSION: Amy, Gelareh, Branka ELIMINATED: Branka
7	TBA	May 29, 2011	107
Gelareh and Amy, who had just entered Beirut, were driven to the Royal Suite of the Grand Hills Hotel. Meanwhile, back at the penthouse, the remaining four girls thought all three girls were eliminated. Paris set them a challenge to make themselves over to copy one of her iconic looks. Paris then returned to the penthouse and told the girls of her trip to Lebanon and challenged them to teach her some Arabic catchphrases. After this, Amy and Gelareh creeped in and surprised the girls. The next day, Paris invited the girls to accompany her for a trial run red carpet event. Each girl had photos taken and questions from the paparazzi. Paris was disappointed to see Gelareh ditch her midway for photographs, whilst Dana was overcome with nerves. Paris later revealed that Reem won the challenge. Gelareh, Amy and Mandy were chosen for discussion. Gelareh was eliminated. She then warned the girls of another elimination. Dana openly revealed that Mandy was not as genuine as she made out, which led to a retaliation from Mandy. Amy then exposed that close friends, Mandy and Dina had recently fallen out, as Dina had decided that she would not leave alongside Mandy if eliminated, as they had once planned. Mandy was eventually eliminated. As she walked out, Dina followed to console her; it appeared that both had a spat outside the discussion room. Dina later returned to take her seat, where the four girls were declared as 'the final four.' LITTLE STAR: DISCUSSION: Gelareh, Amy, Mandy ELIMINATED: Gelareh, Mandy
8	TBA	June 5, 2011	108
Paris reminisced the journey of finding her BFF in Dubai, right from the first episode, up to the seventh episode. She recaps her favourite challenges, the arguments, eliminations and more. LITTLE STAR: NONE DISCUSSION: NONE ELIMINATED: NONE
9	TBA	June 12, 2011	109
The four finalists arrived at a photo-shoot venue where Paris was modelling. She invited the girls for a group photo, which led to a one-on-one session with each finalist. Each had their photo taken with Paris, as well as an opportunity to answer her questions. Amy used the chance to complain about the others, and Dana criticized Dina and Reem. Later, Paris organized an exclusive meal for the finalists. They remembered their time on the show and reminisced past contestants. After their return to the penthouse, Paris gave the girls a challenge. They had to rank themselves according to various tag-lines such as the "Best Cook", "Most Intelligent" and more. The girls debated and disagreed with certain rankings. A division appeared between the group: Reem and Dina, and Amy and Dana. Later, the finalists were sent shopping to choose a dress that celebrated their heritage. After, they were all brought in front of Paris, and they all had an open conversation about each other. At the end of the discussion, Paris revealed she was worried about Dina's label of being fake; concerned that Dana was too mysterious; apprehensive about Amy's intensity, and bothered that she and Reem could be too different. Amy was eventually eliminated. Paris made an unexpected exit, and Abdul entered to announce that the winner would be taken to Paris. The three finalists were escorted to various destinations. Dina entered a venue to disappointingly find Dana present; both realised that Reem had won. Reem was taken to a location, where she was surprised to find Paris. She hugged Reem, who was declared her new BFF. Paris explained that she felt that Reem was the most real, genuine and graceful under pressure- qualities which she desired from a BFF. LITTLE STAR: NONE DISCUSSION: Amy, Dina, Dana, Reem ELIMINATED: Amy, Dina, Dana WINNER: Reem
