= Onch Movement =

American fashion designer

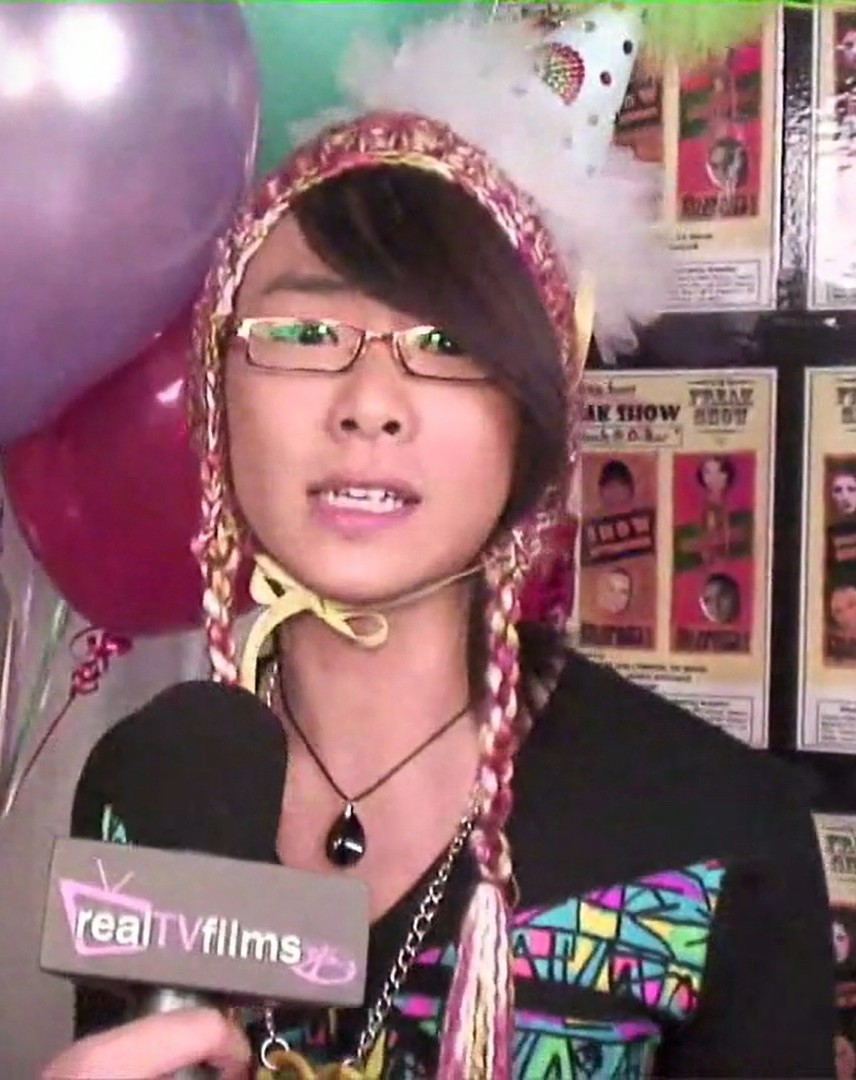
- Onch in 2009
- Born: Nelson Chung; August 24, 1985 (age 41); Taiwan
- Education: The Art Institute of California - Los Angeles
- Occupations: Reality Television Host, Jewelry Designer
- Known for: Paris Hilton's My New BFF

Nelson Chung (born August 24, 1985), known professionally as ONCH (formerly Onch Movement)(/ɒntʃ/), is a Taiwanese American jewelry designer and television personality. Onch appeared on Season 1 of Paris Hilton's My New BFF, and co-hosted Season 2. Onch Movement's jewelry is known for food-themed accessories, as well as jewelry based on licensed products such as My Little Pony, Mr. Potato Head, and Hello Kitty.

== Early life ==
Onch was born in Taiwan. In 2003 he immigrated to the United States to pursue a degree in Graphic Design from The Art Institute of California - Los Angeles.

== Career ==
=== Reality Television ===
Onch first appeared in Season 1 of the MTV reality show Paris Hilton's My New BFF. He showed early success, winning a challenge in episode 2. In episode 3 he garnered sympathy after being the victim of racist barbs from another contestant. Despite being eliminated in the fourth episode, Onch remained popular among the fanbase, and was invited to do live coverage of following episodes by E! Entertainment's The Soup.

Onch returned as a co-host for Season 2 of 'My New BFF'. He and Paris have remained friends since.

Onch also appeared in an episode of the Dog Whisperer with Cesar Millan which featured his pet chihuahua.

=== Jewelry Design ===
Onch's jewelry first appeared in the fashion tabloids when model Kate Moss was photographed wearing his bloody razor blade necklace. His accessory line debuted with designer Heatherette in the 2007 LA Fashion week. Onch, whose logo is a pretzel, gained notoriety in 2010 for designing colorful food themed accessories. His 'meat-lace' necklace (inspired by Lady Gaga), was profiled in the LA Times, NBC New York, and Perez Hilton. Lollipops, chicken wings, bananas, and ice cream cones are other foods featured as Onch accessories. On food as inspiration, Onch said, "we humans all relate to it. We have to eat like three times a day. It's something we all like and something we all have in common."

==== Collaborations ====
Onch has collaborated with several toy brands to create themed accessories. In 2012 he worked with Sanrio Co., makers of Hello Kitty, and retailer Forever 21, to create jewelry for the Hello Kitty Forever collection. He has since debuted Hello Kitty branded jewelry for Sanrio's online store.

After designing a 30-inch My Little Pony statue for Hasbro Inc., Onch was signed to a long-term deal with the toymaker. He has created lines based on the My Little Pony and Mr. Potato Head franchises.

In addition to toymakers, Onch has worked with Mugo Electronics on a custom MP3 player, with Japanese artist ShoJono Tomom, and with candy store SWEET! Hollywood.

==== Celebrity Endorsements ====
Onch Movement jewelry is most closely associated with Nicki Minaj, with whom Onch has a branding deal. Minaj wore an Onch ice cream necklace when she won Best Rapper of the Year at MTV's 2011 Video Music Awards. Onch designed his Pink Fried Chicken Wing necklace specifically for the singer. He based the design on a Minaj lyric in a Britney Spears Till the World Ends remix: "I ain't talkin' poultry when I say this chicken's fried." Minaj's popularization of the jewelry led MTV to declare Onch's "food-bling" #2 on the list of Best Celebrity Accessories of 2011.

In addition to Nicki Minaj, celebrities who have worn Onch Movement Jewelry include singer Cher Lloyd for her 2012 world tour, Kate Moss, Kim Kardashian, and duo Sophia Grace & Rosie. Aaron Carter even rocked Onch's pizza chain along with his dog, Onyx, wearing Onch's 14k Gold Pretzel chain for the cover of Contrast Magazine.

== Meaning of "Onch Movement" ==
Chung rebranded himself Onch Movement in college. The name Onch comes from the last two letters of his first name, Nelson, and the first two letters of his last name, Chung. In addition, it is a backronym for "Original Niche Collaborative Heat," his concept for "a bunch of original people collaborating together to create something magical." His stated goal has been to "create an art movement," thus "Movement," his last name.

== Cara Cunningham Promotional Deal and Lawsuit ==
In September 2007, Onch allegedly signed a promotional deal with YouTube Celebrity Cara Cunningham (of "Leave Britney Alone" fame). In exchange for round trip airfare to LA, Cunningham would "wear solely Onch Movement jewelry" during her stay, and would participate in two days of publicity engagements. In October, Onch sued Cunningham for $1 million for alleged breach of contract and fraud. The case was settled out of court for an undisclosed sum.

== Personal life ==
Onch lives in Los Angeles, California.
