= Fake or Real =

Fake or Real may refer to:

- Fake or Real?, a 2000 album by Robot, including a track "Wasted", featuring additional vocals by Karin Dreijer Andersson
- "Fake or Real", an episode of Paris Hilton's Dubai BFF, a 2011 reality television series
- Fake or Real (TV series), a television series hosted by Brian McFayden
- Fake or Real, an English title of ASAL (Asli Atau Palsu), featuring actress Gracia Indri
