= Paris Hilton's My New BFF =

Television series

- Genre: Reality television
- Created by: Stella Bulochnikov; Michael Hirschorn; Paris Hilton
- Starring: Paris Hilton
- Opening theme: "My BFF" by Paris Hilton
- Country of origin: United States
- Original language: English
- No. of seasons: 2
- No. of episodes: 20

Production
- Executive producers: Chris Choun; Jason Moore; Paris Hilton; Stella Bulochnikov; Michael Hirschorn
- Producer: Tony DiSanto
- Production company: Ish Entertainment

Original release
- Network: MTV
- Release: September 30, 2008 – August 4, 2009

Paris Hilton's My New BFF (also known simply as My New BFF and other alternate titles) is an American competitive reality television series in which Paris Hilton searches for her new BFF ("best friend forever"). It was created by Michael Hirschorn, Stella Bulochnikov and Hilton, who also served as executive producers. The series was produced by Ish Entertainment, in association with MTV, on which it ran for two seasons, from September 30, 2008 to August 4, 2009. It spawned two international versions —Paris Hilton's British Best Friend and Paris Hilton's Dubai BFF— which followed between 2009 and 2011.

== Overview ==
Season	Episodes	Originally released	
Season	Episodes	First released	Last released
1	10	September 30, 2008	December 2, 2008
2	10	June 2, 2009	August 4, 2009

=== First season ===
Partial season 1 cast

Sixteen women and two men competed in challenges in an attempt to become Hilton's new best friend. Four of the female contestants were eliminated in the first episode and hence did not feature in promotional material (photo shoots, television spots or even the opening credits) for the season. Guest stars included Benji Madden, Kyle Richards, Richie Rich, Traver Rains, Kathy Hilton, Fergie, Simple Plan, Chris Applebaum, Perez Hilton, Dirt Nasty, Allison Melnick, Ryan Seacrest, Nicky Hilton, Keyshia Cole, Jeff Beacher and Nick Swardson.

Though Hilton was forbidden from revealing the winner before the season finale aired, she had on two separate occasions accidentally referred to the winner as "she" —first on the September 25, 2008 airing of the Late Show with David Letterman, and again on the October 7, 2008 airing of The Ellen DeGeneres Show. On December 2, 2008, it was revealed that Brittany Flickinger had won the contest.

In the episode "Vegas, Baby!", Paris takes the girls to compete in the Folies Bergere at The Tropicana Hotel Las Vegas.

=== Second season ===
Partial season 2 cast

Thirteen women and three men competed in challenges in an attempt to become Paris's latest best friend "forever." Hilton said that she did not stay friends with the first season's winner Brittany Flickinger because "I loved her and I trusted her, but sometimes people get too caught up and they change". Previous contestant Nelson "Onch" Chung appeared as a co-host, while Natalie Reid (a professional Paris Hilton-lookalike who also appeared with Hilton in The Simple Life), made a special guest appearance as Hilton's double in the first episode. Other guest stars included Santino Rice, Kathy Hilton, Doug Reinhardt, Allison Melnick, Lil' Kim, Three Six Mafia, and Kathy Griffin. This is the first and so far only format of the series to include straight men in the competition. David and Chris were added to the competition in episode four, and they do not appear in promotional material for the season. On August 4, 2009, it was revealed in the finale that the contestant Stephen Hampton had won the competition.

== Broadcast history ==
In the United States, Paris Hilton's My New BFF debuted on MTV on September 30, 2008. The second season premiered on June 2, 2009. Internationally, the series debuted in January 2009 on MTV Germany, in April 2009 on MTV Asia and MTV Latin America, and in May 2010 on MTV Australia.

== Reception ==
=== Critical response ===
Kari Croop, for Common Sense Media, described the series as a "vapid reality contest" that "reinforces shallow values", and further stated that "parents need to know that the overall message here —that being fabulous in Paris Hilton's eyes requires a girl (or guy) to look hot, party hard, and work the red carpet— is troubling, to say the least. Paris says she's looking for a classy friend who can show she's "real," too, but outward appearances seem far more important". Writing for The Boston Globe website Boston.com, Joanna Weiss remarked that "[...] the more you watch this woman —and I've been watching far too much of her new MTV reality contest, Paris Hilton's My New BFF— the less charisma she seems to have. She exists as a blank slate, interesting only because of the way she makes other people behave".

=== U.S. television ratings ===
The first season's third episode bought in 1.6 million viewers, which topped all other cable shows in its time slot and marked a 22 percent improvement from the previous week. It also averaged a 1.6 rating among viewers 12-34 (up 23 percent over the previous week). The season finale posted a 1.8 P12-34 rating, making it the highest of the season. It also outperformed its prior four-episode average by 54 percent among viewers. The first season ranked number one in its time among viewers 12-34 and reached over 81 million total viewers (P2+). The second season's premiere attracted 809,000 viewers.

=== Awards and recognition ===
Year	Association	Category	Recipient	Result
2009	Teen Choice Awards	Choice Reality Television Star – Female	Paris Hilton	Nominated
2009	Fox Reality Awards	Innovator of Reality Television	Paris Hilton	Won

== Home media ==
The DVD of the series' first season was released in Australia on September 28, 2010, as a three-disc set, including every episode as well as three of the four specials aired on MTV.

== International versions ==
=== United Kingdom ===
The British version of the series, Paris Hilton's British Best Friend, premiered on January 29, 2009, on ITV2, and consisted of 8 episodes. Hilton shot the majority of the series in London, with portions of the first and last episodes shot in the U.S. Twelve women and one man competed in challenges in an attempt to become Paris' British Best Friend.

=== United Arab Emirates ===
Paris Hilton's Dubai BFF was the series' second and last international version. It follows Hilton as she puts a group of twenty-four young women from all throughout the world, but currently living in Dubai, through a series of tests to see who would best complement her lifestyle. This is the first format of the series not to include any male contestants. After a number of delays, the 9-episode series aired on several MTV networks globally in 2011.
