= Gatineau (disambiguation) =

Gatineau is a city in Quebec, Canada.

Gatineau may also refer to:

== Places in Quebec ==
- Gatineau (federal electoral district), a federal riding in the city of Gatineau
- Gatineau (provincial electoral district), a provincial riding in the city of Gatineau and the Upper Gatineau Valley
- Gatineau Hills, a geological formation that makes up part of the southern tip of the Canadian Shield, and acts as the northern shoulder of the Ottawa Valley
- Gatineau Park, a federal park located in western Quebec on the outskirts of the city of Gatineau
- Gatineau River, a river in western Quebec which joins the Ottawa River at the city of Gatineau, Quebec

== Other uses ==
- Félix Gatineau, historian and a politician in Southbridge, Massachusetts
- Gatineau Privilege, a monopoly introduced to limit the cutting of timber along the Gatineau River
- Microsoft Gatineau, the beta name of Microsoft adCenter Analytics
- Gatineau (band), a Canadian francophone hip hop group

== See also ==
- Gastineau (disambiguation)
