= Natalia Kapchuk =

Russian artist

- Наталья Капчук
- Born: 11 March 1984 (age 42); Ekaterinburg, Russia
- Occupation: Artist
- Years active: 2000–present
- Website: kapchukart.com

Natalia Kapchuk (Russian: Наталья Капчук; born on March 11, 1984, in Yekaterinburg, Russia) is an artist, philanthropist, art collector and environmentalist. She is based in London, UK.

== Biography ==
From early childhood, Kapchuk took an interest in art and at the age of six, Natalia began to make ceramic mini-sculptures for sale at local art fairs in Yekaterinburg. She was inspired to work in art studios by her mother, an artist, and sculptor. She gradually learned the basics of sculpting in ceramic. Children's art school became the next stage in her young artist's career, where she studied academic drawing, painting, composition and the history of art. Kapchuk received her B.A. from the Urals State University where she studied at the Faculty of International Relations (Yekaterinburg, Russia). She left Russia in 2007, seeking to apply her talents and creative abilities, eventually turning her attention to the art business and creating artworks in her own studio in Dubai, UAE.

Natalia Kapchuk also continued to improve her art skills in mixed media and painting. In 2017, She studied mixed media and painting at Central Saint Martins College of Art and Design (London, UK) and then at the Chelsea College of Arts (London, UK).

Preferring to work in mixed media, Natalia started combining the technique of collage with painting. Her "Political leaders" series of works explores global trends in economics and politics, representing silhouettes of presidents and heads of state on their national flags. By featuring symbols such as guns, rifles, the Star of David, an upside-down statue of Liberty, the peace sign or Victory hand emoji, the artist reveals associative chains of contemporary society and highlights a tone of political rhetoric in the mass media.

== Eco Art ==
Being an eco-oriented person and passionate traveler, Natalia started to pay attention to environmental concerns and ecological problems in her art. “The Lost Planet” series of works is devoted to such issues as global warming, climate change, environmental damage; air, water, and land pollution, polar ice melting, coral bleaching, deforestation, wildfires, ozone depletion, species extinction, and many others.

In her work, she experiments by using natural elements (tree bark, sand, stones, crystals, fermented moss, dried flowers) and industrial materials such as polymers, resin, resi-crete, diamond dust, gilding, metal chips, and plastic. Some single-use plastics such as recycled materials are featured in artworks’ bases using resin poured into a round mould.

== Other work ==
Kapchuk was a leading actress in the TV series Meet the Russians by Fox TV. The show was aired on BSkyB in 2013 and then across Europe and America. She acted and co-produced a movie of Maeve Murphy "Taking Stock", a "Bonnie and Clyde" inspired contemporary comedy-drama starting Kelly Brook.

As a philanthropist and an art ambassador of the Parliamentary Society of Arts, Fashion and Sport (UK), Natalia Kapchuk continues to draw attention to important environmental issues affecting the future of the planet. She travels extensively around the world, becoming inspired by the beauty of nature, and exploring the environmental challenges and negative impact of industrial activities. Kapchuk organizes cleanup actions in the Mediterranean Sea, and collaborates with environmental movements and organizations to preserve nature and save ecosystems around the world.

In 2011, she appeared on the reality television show Paris Hilton's Dubai BFF, where she was eliminated in episode one and returned as a guest in episode six.

In 2016 she starred in the item number "Tipsy Hogai" from the Bollywood film Dilliwali Zaalim Girlfriend.

== Exhibitions ==
Solo Exhibitions and Art Projects

- 2021 – The Lost Planet, Unit X, London, UK
- 2022 – The Lost Planet, Expo 2020 Dubai for Antigua and Barbuda Pavilion, Dubai, UAE
- 2022 – The Lost Planet, CICA Museum, Gyeonggi-do, South Korea
- 2023 – The Lost Planet, Me Dubai Gallery Space, Dubai, UAE
- 2023 – The Lost Planet, Global Citizen Forum, Ras Al Khaimah, UAE

Selected Group Exhibitions

- 2019 – London Contemporary, The Line Gallery, London, UK
- 2019 – Consciousness, Anima Mundi International Art Festival, Venice, Italy
- 2021 – The Lost Planet (digital exhibition), Emerging Scene Art Prize, Dubai and Abu Dhabi, UAE
- 2021 – Submergence:Going Below the Surface with Orca and Salmon, Jack Straw Cultural Center, Seattle, USA
- 2022 – The Lost Planet, Elie Art Gallery of Château de Crémat, Nice, France
- 2023 – Wells Art Contemporary, Wells Cathedral, Wells, UK
- 2023 – London Art Biennale, Chelsea Old Town Hall, London, UK
- 2023 – COSMIC, The Holy Art Gallery, London, UK

Fairs

- 2022 – Barcelona International Art Fair, Museum Marítim de Barcelona, Barcelona, Spain
- 2022 – India Art Fair, NSIC Exhibition Ground, South Asia, New Delhi
- 2022 – Armenia Art Fair, Yerevan Expo Center, Yerevan, Armenia
- 2023 – StART Art Fair, Saatchi Gallery, London, UK
- 2023 – Shanghai International Art Fair, National Exhibition and Convention Center, Shanghai, China

== Awards ==
- 2020 – Winner of the nomination "Outstanding contribution to international art and culture", UWILL Award, London, UK
- 2019 – International Michelangelo Art Prize 2019 for "The planet made of gold" artwork, Rome, Italy
- 2022 – Excellence Certificate and Honor Medal for “Outstanding Achievement and Awareness Contribution for the World Environment”, Parliamentary Society of Arts, Fashion and Sports Award, London (UK)
- 2023 – Finalist Certificate for 'Best Visual Art', Magzoid Magazine, Dubai (UAE)
- 2023 – Award Certificate for 'Harmony for Humanity: The Global Consciousness Art Prize', Contemporary Art Collectors, London, (UK)*
