= Heatherette =

American fashion company

- Industry: Fashion
- Founded: 1999
- Founder: Richie Rich, Traver Rains
- Defunct: 2008
- Headquarters: New York City, New York
- Key people: Patricia Field
- Products: Apparel, accessories, cosmetics

Heatherette was an American fashion company that closed in 2008. It was founded in 1999 by Club Kid Richie Rich and Traver Rains. The pair first began designing T-shirts and leather goods. When Rich wore one of their leather tops to a party, he caught the attention of a buyer at the downtown store Patricia Field.

== History ==
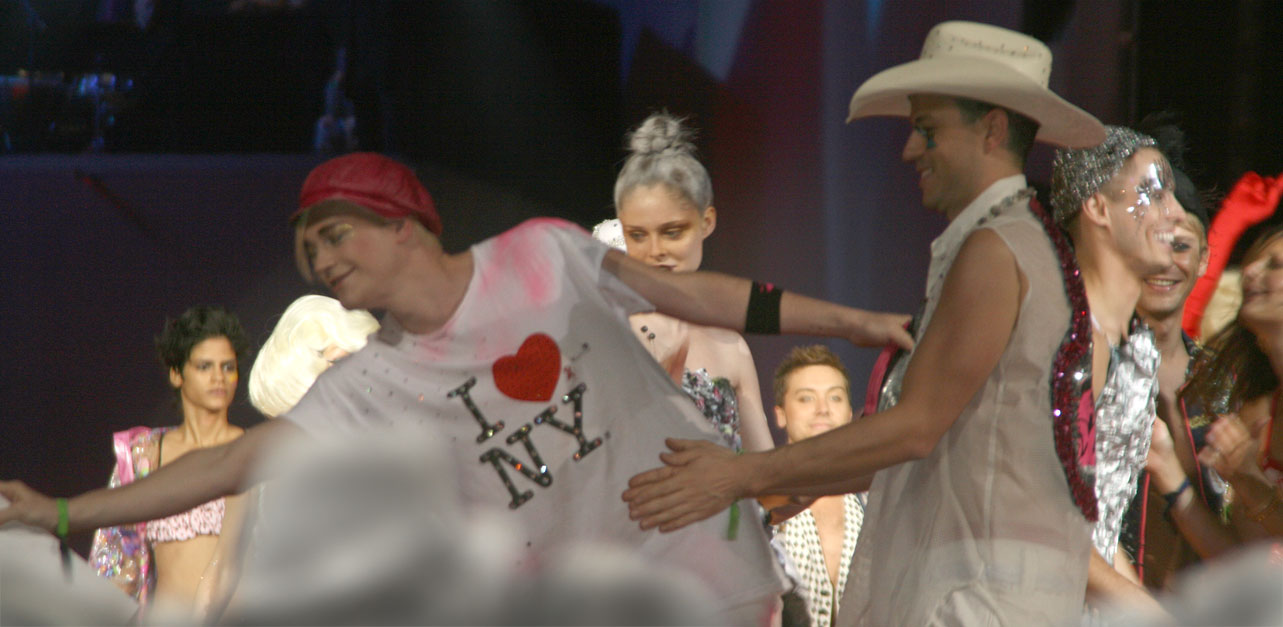
Heatherette fashion show at the Life Ball, 2007

Heatherette was established in the late 1999. At that time, former club kid and nightlife fixture Richie Rich was working with event producer Susanne Bartsch. Traver Rains had just moved to New York City from Dallas and was teaching horseback riding at Chelsea Piers, where he and Rich first met. Rains later recalled: "Richie was assisting Susanne Bartsch at the time, and her son Bailey was taking riding lessons. Richie came to pick Bailey up one day in leather pants, and I was making leather t-shirt at the time, so we started talking about that." Together, they began designing T-shirts and leather goods. In December of that year, Rich wore one of their leather tops to a party where he was noticed by a buyer for Patricia Field's store, who ordered 20 of them. By the time they sold out, their work had attracted the attention of the American rapper Foxy Brown, who asked them to design a custom outfit for her to wear to the MTV Video Music Awards. Shortly afterwards, singer Gwen Stefani was featured wearing one of their tops in Entertainment Weekly, and Patricia Field asked them to design a T-shirt for Sarah Jessica Parker's character on the television series Sex and the City.

Heatherette's debut ready-to-wear collection "Look at Me" was introduced during the New York Fashion Week in September 2001.

== In popular culture ==
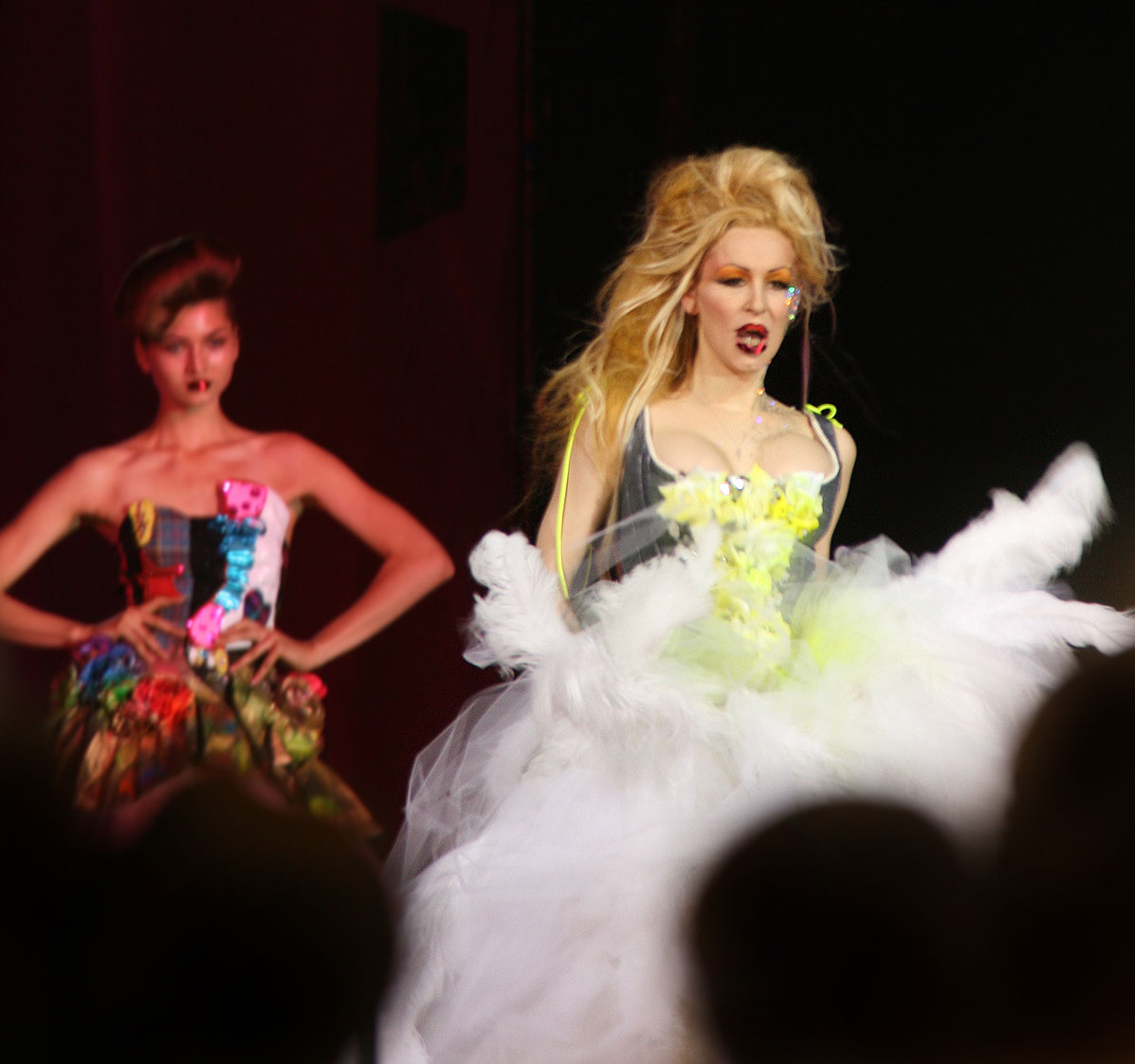
Heatherette fashion show at the Life Ball, 2007

Many celebrities have worn Heatherette fashions in public. Paris Hilton, Lydia Hearst, Caroline D'Amore, Amanda Lepore, Naomi Campbell, Miranda Kerr, Tinsley Mortimer, Kim Kardashian, J. Alexander, Mena Suvari, Anna Nicole Smith, Mýa, Kelis and Jenna Jameson have modeled their fashions in runway shows.

Heatherette has received editorial credits in a variety of different genres of magazines. An especially wild Heatherette fashion show, which featured Anna Nicole Smith and Boy George, is chronicled in the Glenn Belverio's 2006 nonfiction book, Confessions from the Velvet Ropes. Heatherette has also been featured at New York Fashion Week.

Heatherette was featured on the third cycle of America's Next Top Model as the designer for a fashion show contest. They were guest judges on Project Runway Canada for the "When It Rains It Pours" challenge and also on Project Runway when contestants had to make costumes for WWE Divas. Heatherette was also featured on several television programmes and in the movie My Super Ex-Girlfriend.

Traver was featured on FashionTelevision in an interview by Jeanne Beker.

Traver and Richie Rich appeared in the 2005 film One Last Thing....

On March 20, 2008, a collaboration collection with MAC Cosmetics, called "Heatherette for MAC", was released and includes illustrations of Traver Rains and Richie Rich on the cardboard packaging. This is the second collaboration between Heatherette and MAC Cosmetics.
