= The Gastineau Girls =

- Genre: Reality
- Directed by: Lisa Caruso; Miles Kahn; Mark Perez
- Starring: Lisa Gastineau; Brittny Gastineau
- Theme music composer: Didier Rachou; SupaSonics
- Country of origin: United States
- Original language: English
- No. of seasons: 2
- No. of episodes: 18

Production
- Executive producers: Glenda Hersch; Ann Lewis; Sara Nichols; Steven Weinstock
- Producers: Jerry Kolber; Toy Newkirk
- Editors: Virginie Danglades; Julie Bob Lombardi; Tennille Uithof
- Running time: 30 minutes

Original release
- Network: E!
- Release: February 15, 2005 – February 7, 2006

Gastineau Girls is an American reality series that made its debut on the E! cable channel in 2005. The show followed the daily exploits of Lisa Gastineau and Brittny Gastineau, respectively the ex-wife and only daughter (whom he has not seen in 17 years) of former NFL player Mark Gastineau.

== Synopsis ==
The first season chronicled Lisa and Brittny's quest for love in New York City as well as Brittny's attempt to make it in the world of modeling. After its initial season ended, E! renewed the show for a second season. After airing two seasons, the show was cancelled.

The series was produced by True Entertainment, a subsidiary of Endemol Entertainment, known for CBS' Big Brother.

== Episodes ==
=== Season 1 ===
Episode #	Episode title	Original airdate
1-1	"Home, Sweet Home?"	February 15, 2005
1-2	"Race to Midnight"	February 15, 2005
1-3	"In the Doghouse"	February 22, 2005
1-4	"Paradise Lost"	March 1, 2005
1-5	"Bahama Mama"	March 15, 2005
1-6	"Model Citizens"	March 22, 2005
1-7	"Working Girls"	March 29, 2005
1-8	"L.A. Women"	April 5, 2005

=== Season 2 ===
Episode #	Episode title	Original airdate
2-1	"California Dreamin'"	November 29, 2005
2-2	"Singing the Blues"	December 6, 2005
2-3	"Working Girls"	December 13, 2005
2-4	"Shake Your Groove Thang"	December 20, 2005
2-5	"Hitting the Road"	December 27, 2005
2-6	"Hard Labor"	January 10, 2006
2-7	"Mama Drama"	January 24, 2006
2-8	"It's My Party"	January 31, 2006
2-9	"Blowin' a Fuse"	February 7, 2006
2-10	"Homebody"	February 7, 2006

== DVD release ==
On January 31, 2006, the series' first complete season was released on Region 1 DVD in the United States.

== Awards and nominations ==
Year	Award	Result	Category	Recipient
2005	Teen Choice Awards	Nominated	Choice TV Reality/Variety Star - Female	Brittny Gastineau
