= Mark Gastineau =

American gridiron football player (born 1956)

No. 99
- Position: Defensive end

Personal information
- Born: November 20, 1956 (age 70); Ardmore, Oklahoma, U.S.
- Listed height: 6 ft 5 in (1.96 m)
- Listed weight: 266 lb (121 kg)

Career information
- High school: Round Valley (Eagar, Arizona)
- College: Eastern Arizona (1975); Arizona State (1976); East Central (1977–1978)
- NFL draft: 1979: 2nd round, 41st overall pick

Career history
- New York Jets (1979–1988); BC Lions (1990)

Awards and highlights
- NFL Defensive Player of the Year (NEA) (1982); 3× First-team All-Pro (1982–1984); Second-team All-Pro (1981); 5× Pro Bowl (1981–1985); 2× NFL sacks leader (1983, 1984); New York Jets Ring of Honor; New York Jets All-Time Four Decade Team; NFL record: Consec. seasons leading NFL in sacks: 2 (Note: Tied with Reggie White and T. J. Watt)

Career NFL statistics
- Sacks: 107.5
- Fumble recoveries: 9
- Defensive touchdowns: 2
- Stats at Pro Football Reference

Marcus Dell Gastineau (born November 20, 1956) is an American former professional football defensive end who played in the National Football League (NFL) for 10 seasons with the New York Jets. Following stints with the Eastern Arizona Gila Monsters and Arizona State Sun Devils, he played college football for the East Central Tigers. Gastineau was selected by the Jets in the second round of the 1979 NFL draft.

A member of the Jets' New York Sack Exchange defense, Gastineau was named Defensive Player of the Year in 1982 and was the first player to lead the league in sacks in consecutive seasons. He also received five Pro Bowl and four first-team All-Pro selections. At the time of his retirement, he held the single season sack record. For his accomplishments in New York, Gastineau was inducted to the Jets Ring of Honor in 2012.

== College career ==
He entered Eastern Arizona Junior College in 1975 and earned All-America honors in his first season. He transferred to Arizona State University, and spent just one season playing defensive end there before finally settling upon then NAIA school East Central Oklahoma State University, now East Central University, in Ada, Oklahoma. He had 27 quarterback sacks in his college career, and earned Outstanding Defensive Lineman honors for the North in the 1979 Senior Bowl.

Gastineau became ECU's first-ever draft pick when the New York Jets selected him in the second round of the 1979 NFL draft. Connie Carberg, the first female NFL scout in history, was credited with helping the Jets discover Gastineau. The team was coaching in the Senior Bowl and needed another defensive lineman on the roster due to a vacancy, so Carberg called several prospects before suggesting Gastineau to be the replacement based on a phone conversation with him. He was projected to be an eighth round draft pick at the time, but due to his performance in the Senior Bowl and other pre-draft processes, the Jets selected him in the second round.

== Professional career ==
Gastineau was among the most talented and honored defensive linemen of his era. He made the Pro Bowl five straight seasons (1981–1985) and finished his ten-year career with 74 officially recorded sacks (sacks were not an official stat for the first three years of his career). He was a First-team All-Pro in 1982–1984 and was consensus All-AFC in each of those years.

=== The "New York Sack Exchange" ===
In New York, Gastineau was a key part of the famed "New York Sack Exchange", the Jets defensive line that also included Joe Klecko, Marty Lyons and Abdul Salaam. The four combined for 66 sacks in 1981, including 20 by Gastineau (in 1981 sacks were unofficial, but Gastineau's 20 sacks trailed Klecko by only half a sack), to lead the Jets to their first playoff game since 1969. He was second-team All-Pro in 1981 as well as being consensus All-AFC. In November 1981, he, Klecko, Lyons, and Salaam were invited to ring the ceremonial opening bell at the New York Stock Exchange, which served as the inspiration for their nickname.

With Klecko rupturing the patella tendon in his right knee in the second game of the strike shortened 1982 season against the New England Patriots, Gastineau became the new unofficial leader of the "Sack Exchange". Though he was often double-teamed, he finished the season with six sacks, and was voted the NFL Defensive Player of the Year by NEA (and awarded the George Halas Trophy). The Jets made the playoffs again in 1982, losing the AFC Championship game to the Miami Dolphins.

=== Defensive Player of the Year ===
The 1983 season started with Gastineau and the Jets' first round pick of the 1983 NFL draft, quarterback Ken O'Brien, being arrested and charged with assault at Studio 54. Despite this off-the-field indiscretion, Gastineau totaled 19 sacks to lead the NFL for the first time.

Gastineau was nationally famous for doing his signature "Sack Dance" after sacking an opposing quarterback. However, he had to stop when the NFL declared it "unsportsmanlike taunting" in March 1984 and began fining players for it. The ban on the dance stemmed from a bench-clearing brawl in the third quarter of a 27–24 overtime win over the Los Angeles Rams at Shea Stadium on September 25, 1983, which began with a sack of Vince Ferragamo by Gastineau who was then shoved from behind by Jackie Slater, the right tackle he had beaten on the play. One month later on October 21, a total of $15,750 in fines was assessed by the NFL against 16 Jets ($7,300) and 21 Rams ($8,450), with Gastineau incurring a $1,000 penalty.

Gastineau had his best individual season with an NFL record 22 sacks (leading the NFL for the second year in a row), 69 tackles and one fumble recovery for a touchdown in 1984. He was voted the UPI AFC Defensive Player of the Year, and was also named MVP of that season's Pro Bowl after tallying four sacks and a safety in that game. Gastineau's sack record stood for 17 years until Michael Strahan broke it in 2001.

New defensive coordinator Bud Carson installed a 3-4 defense for the 1985 season. Gastineau shifted from left defensive end to right defensive end, although he did move him around to allow for mismatches. Gastineau broke his hand early in that season but still finished second in the league with 13½ sacks and was voted All-Pro by the NEA.

The Jets finished 11–5 in 1985 to earn a wildcard spot in the playoffs along with fellow AFC East rivals, the New England Patriots. Gastineau recorded a sack in the Jets' 26–14 loss to the Pats at the Meadowlands.

=== 1986 playoffs ===
For the start of the 1986 season, Gastineau was featured on the cover of Sports Illustrated alongside New York Giants star linebacker Lawrence Taylor. Injuries limited Gastineau to just two sacks in ten games (his lowest total since his rookie season) as he was slowed by groin and abdominal muscle ailments and then by a damaged left knee that required arthroscopic surgery and forced him to miss the last five games of the regular season.

Gastineau rebounded in the postseason, however, recording a sack in the Jets 35–15 wildcard round victory over the Kansas City Chiefs and 2 1/2 more in the divisional-round playoff game against the Cleveland Browns. Late in the fourth quarter of that game, though, with the Jets leading 20–10 and the Browns facing a second down and 24 from their own 18-yard line, Gastineau was called for a roughing the passer penalty.

The play had originally resulted in an incomplete pass by Browns quarterback Bernie Kosar so instead of having a 3rd-and-24 situation, the 15-yard penalty on Gastineau gave the Browns a first down at their own 33. From there, the Browns drove the remaining 67 yards to a touchdown which cut the Jets' lead to 20–17. The Browns would later tie the game with 7 seconds remaining in regulation on a 22-yard field goal by Mark Moseley and win it on a 27-yard field goal by Moseley 2 minutes and 2 seconds into the second overtime period.

After the game, Gastineau said that he hadn't been guilty of roughing and that he was "just following through." Teammate Marty Lyons, the Jets' other starting defensive end, defended Gastineau saying, "(Ben Dreith) is a referee who's known to take care of the quarterback." Joe Walton, the Jets' head coach would say only, "It was a very key play, Mark was just trying to do the best he could do."

=== 1987 NFL Players' strike ===
In 1987, Gastineau was the only Jet regular to immediately cross the picket line in that year's players' strike, citing his need to pay alimony. Teammate Dave Jennings said of this understandably unpopular move: "We expected it from Mark. He's always put himself in front of the team." The crossing brought to a head longstanding tensions between Gastineau and his teammates; he had never been popular in the locker room. Gastineau got into a fight with backup center Guy Bingham when he drove into the Jets complex early in the strike. Gastineau was later joined in crossing the picket line by teammates Marty Lyons and Joe Klecko, further undermining the players' strike.

=== Retirement ===
Gastineau led the AFC in sacks seven weeks into the 1988 season. He then abruptly announced his retirement soon after Brigitte Nielsen, to whom he had previously announced his engagement, claimed to be suffering from cancer of the uterus. The announcement was followed by a surge of investigation by local New York papers of whether she was telling the truth, reflecting citywide mistrust of Gastineau. At the time of his retirement, Gastineau was the NFL's all-time leader in sacks.

Gastineau attempted a comeback with the BC Lions of the Canadian Football League in 1990, but was released after only four games.

Gastineau was inducted into the New York Jets Ring of Honor on October 8, 2012.

In 2022, the Professional Football Researchers Association named Gastineau to the PFRA Hall of Very Good Class of 2022.

== NFL career statistics ==
Legend
| **Bold** | Career high |

| Year | Team | Games | | Defense | | | |
| Year | Team | GP | GS | Sck | Int | FR | TD |
|---|---|---|---|---|---|---|---|
| 1979 | NYJ | 16 | 1 | 2.0* | 0 | 0 | 0 |
| 1980 | NYJ | 16 | 16 | 11.5* | 0 | 0 | 0 |
| 1981 | NYJ | 16 | 16 | 20.0* | 0 | 2 | 0 |
| 1982 | NYJ | 9 | 9 | 6.0 | 0 | 0 | 0 |
| 1983 | NYJ | 16 | 16 | 19.0 | 0 | 2 | **1** |
| 1984 | NYJ | 16 | 16 | **22.0** | 0 | 1 | **1** |
| 1985 | NYJ | 16 | 12 | 13.5 | 0 | **3** | 0 |
| 1986 | NYJ | 10 | 7 | 2.0 | 0 | 0 | 0 |
| 1987 | NYJ | 15 | 7 | 4.5 | 0 | 0 | 0 |
| 1988 | NYJ | 7 | 7 | 7.0 | 0 | 1 | 0 |
| Career | | 137 | 108 | 107.5 | 0 | 9 | 2 |

- Sacks were not an official stat until 1982

== Boxing ==
In 1991, Gastineau began a career in boxing, lasting five years. In his first fight, Gastineau knocked out Derrick Dukes in the first round. Dukes, a professional wrestler, later admitted he took a dive. TV newsmagazine show 60 Minutes interviewed several others that fought Gastineau and were told to take dives to make Gastineau look good. His career ended in 1996 when he lost to another former football player, Alonzo Highsmith. In 18 career bouts, his record in boxing was 15 wins, two losses, and one no-contest.

== Personal life ==
Gastineau has been married three times. His first wife, Lisa Gastineau and their daughter Brittny Gastineau starred in the E! reality television show, The Gastineau Girls. Gastineau has a son with actress Brigitte Nielsen, Killian Marcus. He was estranged from both children in 2010.

On September 13, 2000, Gastineau was sentenced to 18 months in prison, stemming from a 1998 guilty plea for assaulting his wife. Shortly after his release, serving four months, he claimed he had put his turbulent past behind him after he had a religious conversion to faith in Jesus Christ. Gastineau has appeared on programs such as The 700 Club to speak of his experience. Gastineau is a member of the choir at Times Square Church, where he married third wife JoAnn in 2007.

=== Legal issues ===
In 1984, Gastineau was found guilty of assaulting a patron at Studio 54. He was sentenced to 90 hours of community service, teaching football to inmates at Rikers Island.

In 1991, Gastineau was arrested for picking up a package of amphetamine pills at Phoenix Sky Harbor Airport. He was sentenced to three years probation in 1993.

In September 2000, Gastineau was sentenced to 18 months in prison after failing to complete an anger management course after hitting his second wife Patricia.

In 2023, Gastineau confronted Brett Favre at an autograph signing while ESPN was filming a 30 for 30 documentary on the New York Sack Exchange over Favre allegedly "diving" and letting Strahan break his single season sack record, a belief that is generally widely held. The portrayal of Gastineau in the video footage of him confronting Favre led to a $25 million lawsuit by Gastineau against ESPN.

=== Health ===
In 2016, Gastineau was diagnosed with dementia, Parkinson's disease, and Alzheimer's disease. Gastineau said he believed the illnesses could be traced back to football, stating he wanted to continue to teach younger football players how to play the game safely. He blames the brain diseases on poor tackling technique.

In March 2019, Gastineau revealed that he had been battling colon cancer.
