= Gastineau Peak =

Mountain in Alaska, United States

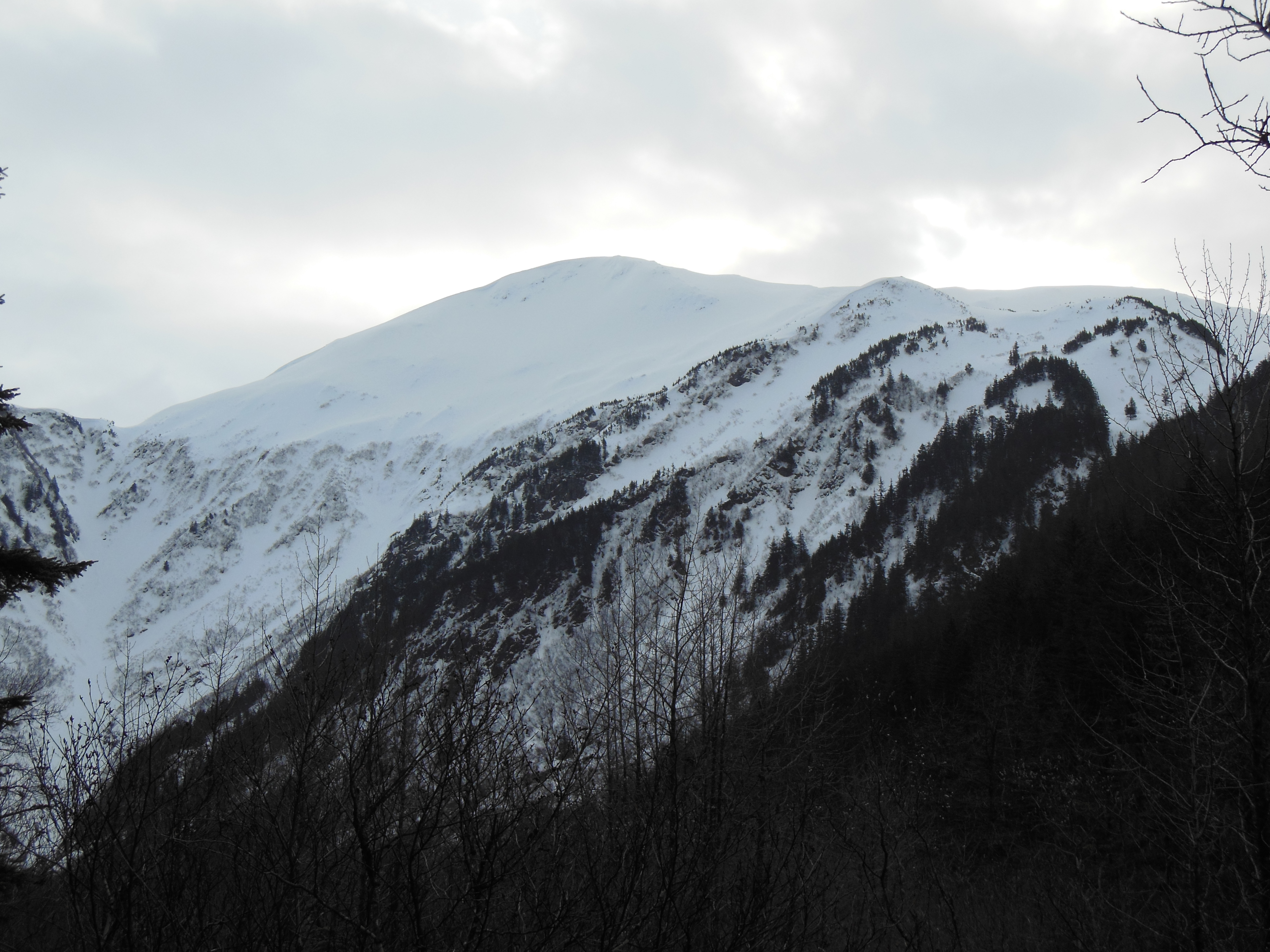

Highest point
- Elevation: 3,465 ft (1,056 m)
- Coordinates: 58°17′26″N 134°20′40″W

Geography
- Location: Juneau, Alaska, United States
- Parent range: Boundary Ranges
- Topo map: USGS Juneau B-2

Gastineau Peak is a mountain in the city and borough of Juneau, Alaska, United States. It is a part of the Boundary Ranges of the Coast Mountains in western North America. It is located 1.6 miles west of Sheep Mountain and 2.4 miles southeast of the city of Juneau.

The name was already in use and noted by United States Geological Survey (USGS) official D. C. Witherspoon in 1916 and first published in 1918. It was entered into the USGS's Geographic Names Information System on March 31, 1981.

== Gallery ==
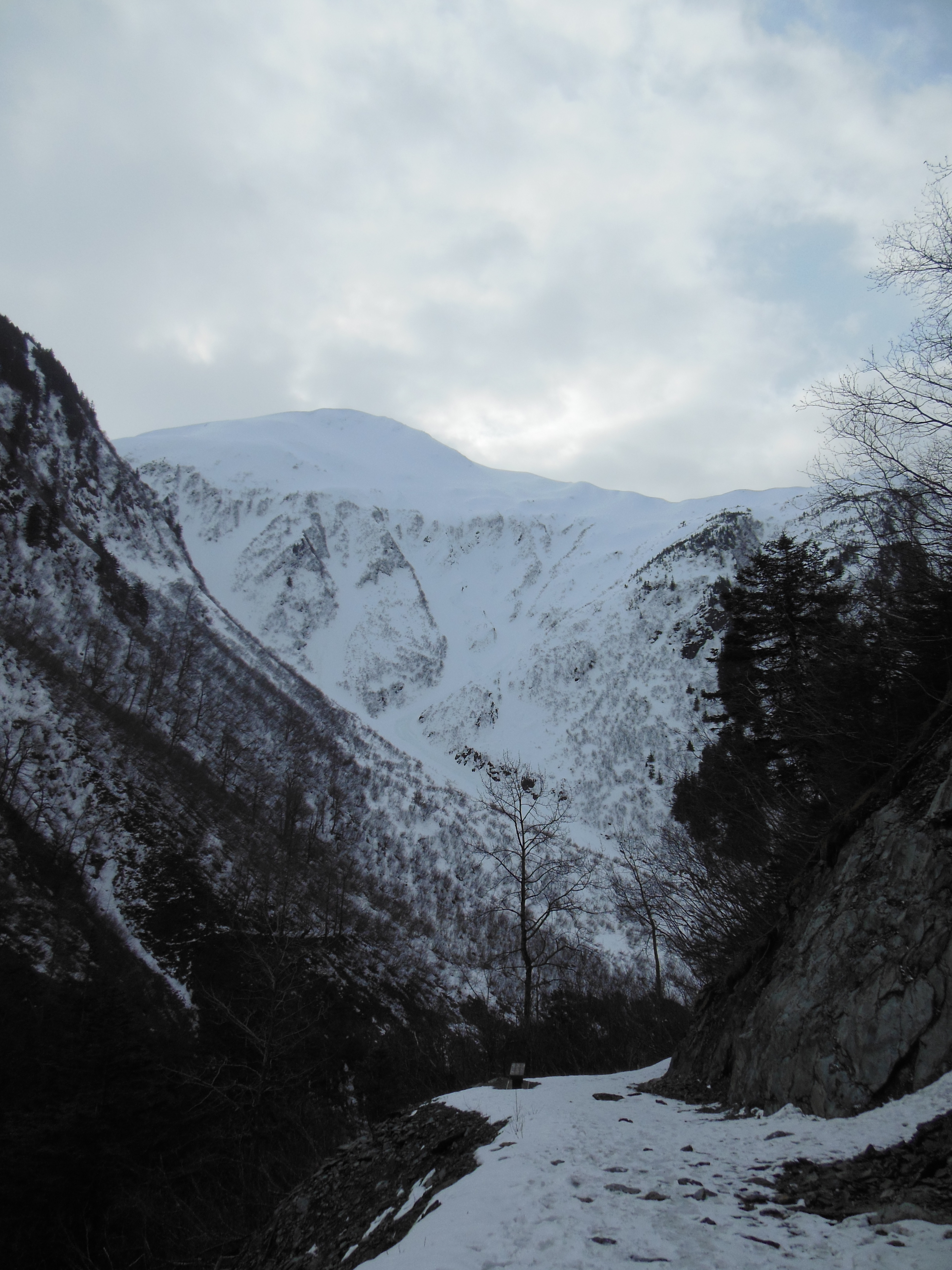
Profile

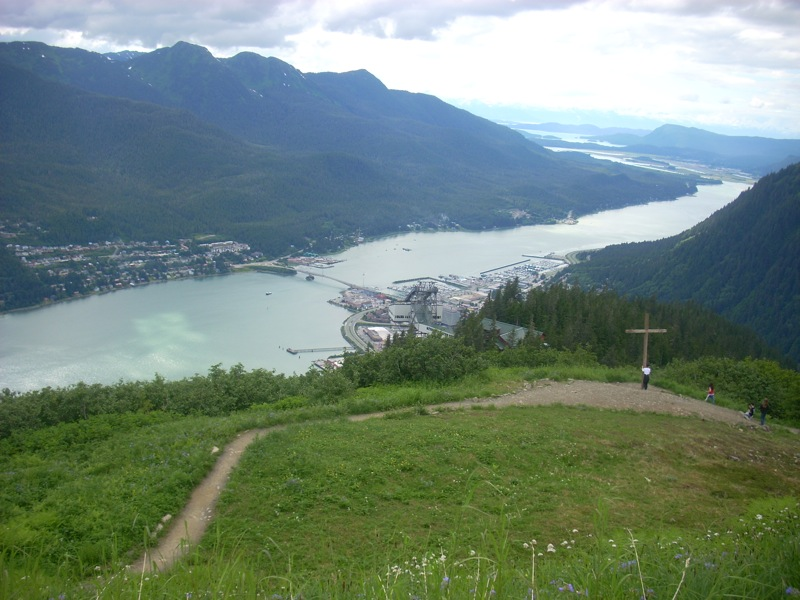
View from about 2000ft elevation, looking northwest
