= Lisa Gastineau =

American socialite and TV personality

- Born: Lisa D'Amico; December 11, 1959 (age 66); Rockland County, New York, U.S.
- Known for: The Gastineau Girls
- Height: 1.71 m (5 ft 7 in)
- Spouse: Mark Gastineau (m. 1979; div. 1991)
- Children: Brittny Gastineau

Lisa D'Amico Gastineau (born December 11, 1959) is the co-star of the E! reality show The Gastineau Girls, which ran from 2005 to 2006. She is the mother of model and socialite Brittny Gastineau (her co-star on Gastineau Girls) and the ex-wife of NFL player Mark Gastineau.

== Biography ==
Gastineau is a third-generation New York native. In her earlier years, she was discovered as a teen model. She attended the University of Alabama as a broadcast/communications major.

At age 19, she met Mark Gastineau (who played for the New York Jets from 1979 to 1988), and they married in 1979. They separated in 1986 when she became aware that Mark was having an affair with actress Brigitte Nielsen. Mark announced he was engaged to Nielsen in 1988 (they never married). The divorce was finalized in 1991.

Gastineau has worked for Fox's Good Day New York morning program as an entertainment correspondent.

She has been a buyer and proprietor of high end designer fashion, accessories and jewelry throughout New York. These boutiques included Avalon, Tres Glam, Lisa Pieces, and Trends.

In February 2005, E! Entertainment Channel debuted The Gastineau Girls starring Gastineau and her daughter Brittny. The interest in glamour reality and lifestyle sparked a generation of reality shows to come. Gastineau is a familiar face and expert on reality TV and fashion. Appearances include EXTRA, The View, Entertainment Tonight, Keeping Up With the Kardashians, Oprah, E!, The Insider, and Showbiz Tonight.

Currently Gastineau designs and appears on HSN for Gastineau Glamour, and is the president/designer of Tres Glam fine jewelry. She resides in Los Angeles, California.
