= Allison Melnick =

- Born: June 3, 1971 (age 54); Queens, New York
- Occupations: Socialite, bar owner, reality TV personality

Allison Melnick (born June 3, 1971) is an American socialite, bar owner, and reality TV star originally from Long Island, New York. She is perhaps best known for appearing on the reality show The World According to Paris, where she is seen frequently accompanying Paris Hilton as she shops or travels. In 2008, Melnick opened the Apple Lounge a tiny, 150 occupant bar in the basement of the Apple restaurant in Los Angeles.

== Personal life ==
Allison Melnick was born in Queens New York and graduated from North Babylon High School on Long Island in 1989.

== Career ==
Allison Melnick started her career as a door girl at a local New York nightclub. It was during this period that she first met Paris Hilton. In 2004, she was cast in the SpikeTV reality show The Club set at the now closed Vegas nightclub, Ice. Following the series cancellation, she moved to Los Angeles and worked as a club promoter until opening her own bar the Apple Lounge in 2008. She was also part of an Oxygen reality series The World According to Paris, which followed the exploits of celebutante Paris Hilton.
