= Paris Hilton's My New BFF season 2 =

Paris Hilton's My New BFF
- Season 2
- Starring: Paris Hilton
- No. of episodes: 10

Release
- Original network: MTV
- Original release: June 2 – August 4, 2009

Season chronology
- ← Previous; Season 1

The second season of Paris Hilton's My New BFF aired from June 2 to August 4, 2009, on MTV in the United States, and consists of 10 episodes.

== Season overview ==
Thirteen women and three men competed in challenges in an attempt to become Paris's latest best friend "forever." Hilton said that she did not stay friends with the first season's winner Brittany Flickinger because "I loved her and I trusted her, but sometimes people get too caught up and they change". Previous contestant Nelson "Onch" Chung appeared as a co-host, while Natalie Reid (a professional Paris Hilton-lookalike who also appeared with Hilton in The Simple Life), made a special guest appearance as Hilton's double in the first episode. Other guest stars included Santino Rice, Kathy Hilton, Doug Reinhardt, Allison Melnick, Lil' Kim, Three Six Mafia, and Kathy Griffin. This is the first and so far only format of the series to include straight men in the competition. David and Chris were added to the competition in episode four, and they do not appear in promotional material for the season. On August 4, 2009, it was revealed in the finale that the contestant Stephen Hampton had won the competition.

== Contestants ==
Rank	Name	Episode eliminated
1	Stephen Hampton	Winner on August 4, 2009.
1	Stephen Hampton	Eliminated 14th on July 28, 2009.
2–3	Stefanie Fritz	Episode 10
2–3	Tiniecia Goldsmith	Episode 10
4	Amanda Narcise	Episode 8
5	Elena Miglino	Episode 8
6	David DeStefano	Episode 7
7	Desirae Rodriguez	Episode 6
8–9	Kaitlin Cassidy	Episode 5
8–9	Nicole White	Episode 5
10	Chris Foster	Episode 4
11–12	Katie Rogers	Episode 3
11–12	Kristen Cavey	Episode 3
13	Monica Wolski	Episode 2
14	Arika Sato	Episode 2
15	Arielle DeRouen	Episode 1
16	Rachel Fournier	Episode 1

== Elimination table ==
Contestants	Episodes									
Contestants	1	2	3	4^{[a]}	5	6	7	8	9	10^{[c]}
Stephen	LOW	SAFE	SAFE	SAFE	WIN	SAFE	SAFE	LOW	TTYS	BFF
Tiniecia	SAFE	PET	SAFE	SAFE	WIN	LOW	LOW	SAFE	PET	TTYS
Stefanie	SAFE	SAFE	SAFE	PET	SAFE	SAFE	LOW	PET	PET	TTYS
Amanda	LOW	SAFE	WIN	SAFE	WIN	LOW	PET	TTYN		GUEST
Elena	SAFE	SAFE	SAFE	SAFE	PET	PET	SAFE	TTYS		GUEST
David				LOW	SAFE	LOW	TTYN			GUEST
Desirae	SAFE	SAFE	LOW	SAFE	LOW	TTYS				GUEST
Nicole	SAFE	SAFE	LOW	SAFE	TTYN					GUEST
Kaitlin	SAFE	LOW	WIN	LOW	TTYN					GUEST
Chris				TTYN						GUEST
Kristen	SAFE	SAFE	TTYN							GUEST
Katie	SAFE	SAFE	TTYN							
Monica	SAFE	TTYN								GUEST
Arika	SAFE	TTYN								GUEST
Arielle	TTYN									GUEST
Rachel	TTYN									GUEST

^[a] In episode 4, before the dinner party started, Paris surprised everyone by adding two game-changing contestants (Chris and David) to compete for her friendship.
^[c] Paris surprised everyone when she said she made a mistake by sending Stephen home, and ultimately, Paris wanted him as her BFF.

Key
The contestant is female.
The contestant is male.
The contestant was originally put up for discussion, but the decision was reversed.
The contestant won the episode's challenge and was safe from elimination.
The contestant was eliminated, brought back as a guest, then was named Paris Hilton's new BFF.
The contestant was named Paris Hilton's Pet and won the challenge.
The contestant was named Paris Hilton's Pet.
The contestant was named Paris Hilton's Pet half way through the episode. (Pet changed twice in one episode)
The contestant was still wearing the Pet necklace from the previous episode.
Paris gave the 2nd Pet necklace to Tiniecia when Stephen was eliminated. (Stefanie had the 1st Pet necklace)
The contestant was up for discussion and was saved.
The contestant was a special guest for the season finale.
The contestant won the episode's challenge and was up for discussion at panel.
The contestant was eliminated.
The contestant wasn't put up for discussion and was suddenly eliminated at panel.
The contestant was eliminated outside of panel.
The contestant won the first challenge and became pet; but in the same episode, lost the second challenge, and was put up for discussion for losing the second challenge. (Pet changed twice in one episode)
The contestant was named Paris Hilton's Pet, but was then put up for discussion at panel.
TTYN – Talk To You Never, the goodbye message for eliminated contestants.
TTYS – Talk To You Soon, the goodbye message for eliminated contestants that Paris wanted to keep in runner-up but not be "best" friends.

== Episodes ==
No. in season	Title	Original release date	Prod. code
1	"No More Hungry Tigers"	June 2, 2009	201
The first episode began with Paris telling a fake paparazzi that she and Brittany (season 1 winner) were no longer friends because Brittany turned out to be "a hungry tiger" who was only seeking fame and fortune. Then Paris began choosing contestants, and the chosen contestants all got into waiting cars which took them to the mansion. One of the cars included an undercover Paris disguised as a fellow contestant; she wanted to see how they acted when they thought she wasn't around. The contestants were made to show "Paris" (in fact lookalike Natalie Reid) how much they want to be her BFF. Later on Paris puts up for discussion Arielle and Amanda for not standing out enough. The last challenge of the episode is to pole dance for an audience of men. Stephen refuses and is put up for discussion. At elimination the fatal "TTYN" is to be received by Arielle. Discussion: Arielle, Stephen, Amanda Eliminated: Rachel, Arielle
2	"Sisters Before Misters"	June 9, 2009	202
The challenge for this episode was to host a bachelor party for one of Paris' friends. Monica gave the bachelor a promiscuous lap dance and Paris was so disgusted that she said she wanted to puke; and when Arika kissed the groom-to-be, she was put up for discussion and had to endure the walk of shame. Paris asks what bands they like and says her favorite bands are Green Day, Coldplay, Linkin Park, and The Killers. Tiniecia was the pet for the week and she got the opportunity of sending someone up for discussion. She chose Kaitlin after she had a fight with Stephen the night before. Kaitlin felt like everyone hated her and started crying. After much thinking, Paris sent Arika home for kissing the groom-to-be. After that she surprised Monica with another "TTYN"; she thought Monica's wild dance was not tolerable. Discussion: Arika, Kaitlin Eliminated: Arika, Monica
3	"What's on the Inside and the Outside Counts"	June 16, 2009	203
In this episode all the contestants dig into the world's biggest cupcake where 3 hidden eggs are inside. Inside each egg is a surprise. Desirae, Katie & Kaitlin each find eggs. Inside Kaitlin's egg is a friendship ring. Desirae's has a paper that says "gets exotic dance from Onch" and Katie's egg has a paper saying "choose one contestant to be put up for discussion." She chooses Desirae and that leads to the two of them verbally fighting. Paris then chooses Katie as the new pet and as the pet, it was her job to dress all of the contestants for the next challenge. Katie dresses them in a mix of bows, colorful pieces and tutus. Paris regards them as looking weird. The contestants must then style themselves for the first ever Miss Paris Pageant. After each contestant presents themself to Paris Hilton and guest star Santino Rice, Paris puts Nicole, Katie, and Kristen up for elimination, along with Desirae. She then says TTYN to Katie and Kristen, and Katie shows her true colors, swearing at Paris and saying she's "not as nice as everyone thinks [she] is". She also says "Good luck on your next porno", though this is bleeped out. Paris says she is glad she didn't let her stay, and Desirae points out that no one would believe her about Katie. This change in Katie is ironic after Stephen said earlier that she was the "sweetest girl in the house". Special guest: Santino Rice. Discussion: Desirae, Nicole, Katie, Kristen Eliminated: Katie, Kristen
4	"Can You Hang With My Friends?"	June 23, 2009	204
The remaining ten must host a dinner for Paris' friends and family. The preparations begin and the contestants are sent to Ortolan to work on their table manners. Before the party starts, Paris surprises everyone by adding two game-changing contestants to compete for her friendship, both straight males, Chris and David. Tiniecia immediately criticizes David, suggesting he is only in the competition in order to gain exposure for himself. Later, a dramatic dinner had Stephanie crying when Paris asked the contestants personal questions to which she already knew the answer. Kaitlin was asked if she had ever been with a friend's boyfriend, and she answered no. Stephen shared his feelings about his childhood in a Mormon family, Tiniecia admitted she worked at Hooters, and Chris avoided answering Paris question about which girl in the house he thought was cutest. David also beatboxed. At the TTYN Ceremony, Paris called Chris, David, and Kaitlin up for discussion. Chris was called up because Paris believed he avoided her questioning, David was called up because Paris wasn't sure of his motives, and Kaitlin was called up because she revealed during casting that she had been with a girl's boyfriend and then later lied to Paris about it. Paris decided to give David and Kaitlin another chance, and said TTYN to Chris. Discussion: Chris, David, Kaitlin Eliminated: Chris
5	"Learn From Your Mistakes"	June 30, 2009	205
The contestants are woken up by two police officers, who escort them to a prison where they are told they will have to spend the night. They are changed into pink silk pajamas and put into cells with pink beds. Paris arrives in fishnet tights and a police hat, and explains that they are there to experience what she had experienced in her 27 days in jail. She asks if any of the contestants had done things they were not proud of, and two girls admit to shoplifting. Paris then announces Elena is the pet. She has one on one time with Stephanie, the previous pet, and Elena. The contestants then participate in a mini triathlon. They must carry bags through an obstacle course, climb a rope, and throw paint balloons at a picture of Katie. The contestants have lunch and Paris has someone on one time with Stephen, who was one of the winners of the challenge. The other winners were Tinecia and Amanda. Three 6 Mafia interview each contestant to help Paris get a sense of who they are. They say Desirae seems to be more of a body guard, speculating she seems to have a split personality. A lot of contestants say Kaitlin seems fake, as well as Nicole. Paris then calls out Desirae, Kaitlin, and Nicole, based on Three 6 Mafia's analysis. In the end, Nicole and Kaitlin are sent home, while Desirae stays for another week. Special guests: Three 6 Mafia Discussion: Desirae, Kaitlin, Nicole ELIMINATED: Nicole, Kaitlin
6	"Have My Back"	July 7, 2009	206
The contestants are shown by Paris their very own Paris doll. They drive everyone crazy. Special guest: Lil' Kim Discussion: Amanda, David, Desirae, Tiniecia, Stefanie Eliminated: Desirae
7	"Must Have Good Taste"	July 14, 2009	207
Special guest: Lil Kim Discussion: David, Stefanie, Tiniecia Eliminated: David
8	"Must Have Thick Skin"	July 21, 2009	208
The BFFs were taken through a day which included being at a press junket and to roast each other later that night with help from Kathy Griffin. At the press junket, Amanda showed attitude and argued with the reporter while Stefanie broke down. Stephen wins and is awarded by Paris by being able to be pampered like a king by the other BFFs. Stephen would then also choose the next BFF who would join Amanda up for discussion. The next day, Stephen reluctantly chooses Elena, saying that everybody did a fantastic job. At the roast, Stephen is put up for discussion and has to give the pet necklace to Stefanie for being able to laugh off her roast, while Stephen took it the worst. At the elimination, Amanda and Elena are sent home. Special guest: Kathy Griffin Discussion: Stephen, Elena, Amanda Eliminated: Elena, Amanda
9	"Where Do You Come From?"	July 28, 2009	209
Paris flies home with the BFFs separately to meet their families. Discussion: Stefanie, Stephen, Tiniecia Eliminated: Stephen
10	"Do You Really Know Me?"	August 4, 2009	210
Guests: Amanda, Arielle, Arika, Chris, David, Desirae, Elena, Kaitlin, Kristen, Monica, Nicole, Rachel, Stephen Runners-up: Stefannie, Tiniecia Winner: Stephen Hampton
