= Nayla Al Khaja =

Emirati film director and screenwriter

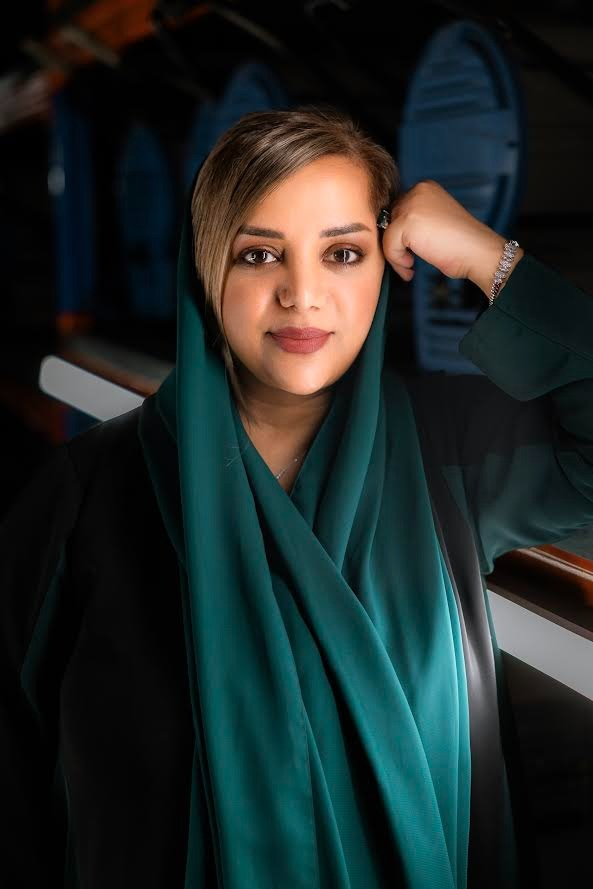
- Born: 7 March 1978 (age 48)
- Occupations: Director, producer
- Spouse: Christian Peter (m. 2016)
- Relatives: 2

Nayla Al Khaja (Arabic: نايلة الخاجة; born March 7 1978) is the first female independent film producer and narrative film director in the United Arab Emirates.

== Early life and education ==
Nayla Al Khaja was born on March 7 1978 and raised in Dubai. She received a degree in mass communication from Dubai Women's College and completed a bachelor's degree in film studies at Ryerson University (now Toronto Metropolitan University) in Canada in 2005, supported by a UAE government scholarship.

== Career ==
AlI Khaja began her career creating short films. Her early works, such as Arabana (2006), Once, Malal, and The Shadow, have been featured and awarded at international film festivals. Both Animal (2016) and The Shadow (2019) were later acquired by Netflix, .

She is registered as a speaker with the London Speaker Bureau and MENA Speakers. Al Khaja has delivered talks, including TED Talks, on topics such as Arab women in media, gender balance, working in male-dominated industries, entrepreneurship, and cultural representation.

=== Debut Feature Film: Three ===
Her debut feature film, Three (2023), is a psychological horror-drama shot in the UAE and Thailand during the COVID-19 pandemic. It premiered at the Red Sea International Film Festival in December 2023 and was scheduled for theatrical release across the Gulf region in early 2024. The film stars British actor Jefferson Hall, alongside Emirati actors Saud Alzarooni, Faten Ahmed, Noura Alabed, and Maree Al Halyan. The film follows a family's quest to comprehend the unsettling behavior of their child, interpreted by some characters as possession. Al Khaja has described Three as a personal and cathartic project that functions as “healing and therapy,” composed of fragments drawn from real-life experiences.

Three had its world premiere on 5 December 2023 at the Red Sea International Film Festival. The film was released theatrically across the Middle East on 1 February 2024, with screenings in the United Arab Emirates, Saudi Arabia, Qatar, Kuwait, Egypt, Jordan, Bahrain, and Oman.

Following its release, Three was featured at several international festivals, including the Al Ain International Film Festival in February 2024, where it won the Best Film Award. It was subsequently screened at the BRICS Film Festival segment of the Moscow International Film Festival (April 2024), the Shanghai International Film Festival (May 2024), the Oldenburg International Film Festival (September 2024), the KinoBraVo International Film Festival (September 2024), the Imagine Fantastic Film Festival (October 2024), the Halloween: Muslim Horror Film Festival (October 2024), and the Minsk International Film Festival (November 2024).

=== Feature Film: Baab ===
In 2025, Al Khaja completed production on Baab, her second feature and first art-house film. The story follows Wahida, haunted by her twin sister's death and drawn into a surreal journey through grief and memory amid the mountains of Ras Al Khaimah.

The film is co-written with prominent Emirati writer Masoud Amralla Al Ali. The film's original score was composed by A. R. Rahman, marking the renowned Indian composer's first collaboration on an Arabic-language feature film. The cinematography has been directed by Rogier Stoffers, a Dutch cinematographer known for his work on Quills (2000), Brown Sugar (2002), and The Scandalous Lady W (2015).

=== Nayla Al Khaja Films ===
In 2002, Nayla Al Khaja founded DESSART Productions in Dubai, which later became D-Seven Motion Pictures and subsequently evolved into Nayla Al Khaja Films. She has served as the company's chief executive officer since 2005. Nayla has directed numerous TV commercials for international brands, including Mercedes, Nike, Nestlé, Neutrogena, and Nivea, among others, along with notable clients like Annie Leibovitz and Roger Federer.

== Filmography ==
=== Feature films ===
Filmography
Year	Title	Notes
2023	Three	
2025	Baab	

=== Short films ===
Year	Title	Credited as			Notes
Year	Title	Director	Writer	Producer	Notes
1996	Sweet Sixteen	Yes	Yes		
1998	3adi.com	Yes			
2003	The Will			Yes	
2005	The Loss			Yes	
2005	Unveiling Dubai	Yes		Yes	
2006	Arabana	Yes	Yes		Best Female Filmmaker – Dubai International Film Festival, 2007
2009	Once	Yes	Yes		
2010	Malal	Yes	Yes		Production of the Year – Digital Studio Award, 2011; 1st prize, Muhr Emirati Category – Dubai International Film Festival, 2010; Best Script – Gulf International Film Festival, 2010; 1st prize, International Young Screen Entrepreneur – British Council, 2010; 1st prize, Emirati Short Film Script Competition – Gulf Film Festival, 2010
2012	Hi	Yes	Yes		
2013	Three	Yes	Yes		Hazawi Fund for Short Film – Doha Film Institute, 2013
2013	The Neighbor	Yes	Yes		Best Short Film – Middle East Now Festival, 2015; Muhr Emirate, Special Jury Award – Dubai International Film Festival, 2015; Best Emirati Film – Abu Dhabi Film Festival, 2013
2016	Animal	Yes	Yes		Best women's issue short – Madrid Arthouse Film Festival, 2022; Best Short Cinematography – Arthouse Festival of Beverly Hills, 2021; Jury Award, Narrative Film – Ras Al Khaimah Fine Arts Festival, 2018; Jury Special Prize, Best Short Fiction – Italian Movie Award, 2017
2019	The Shadow	Yes	Yes		Best Cinematography in Short – Dubai Independent Film Festival, 2022; Best Horror Short – Arthouse Festival of Beverly Hills, 2021; Best Fantasy / Horror Short – WorldFest Houston, 2020; Best United Arab Emirates talent – Al Ain Film Festival, 2020
2022	The Road to Fulfilment	Yes			Documentaries and Reports: Environment, Ecology and Sustainability, Silver Dolphin Award – Cannes Corporate Media & TV Awards, 2023

== Personal life ==
Nayla is married to Christian Peter, a Swiss entrepreneur, with whom she has two children. Al Khaja is proficient in five languages and speaks on topics such as cinema, entrepreneurship, culture, youth motivation, and women's empowerment.

== Awards and honors ==
- "Emirates Woman of the Year", Emirates Woman Magazine, 2005
- "Local Artist of the Year", Emirates Woman Magazine, 2005
- First woman to direct TV commercial, 2005
- "Inspirational Leadership Award", Lloyds TSB Bank, 2006
- "Young Woman Entrepreneur of the Year", Middle East Businesswomen and Leaders Achievement Awards, 2007
- Jury member at the Middle East International Film Festival, 2009
- Member of Abu Dhabi Film Commission, Melbourne International Film Festival, 2010
- UAE representative (Filmmaker Category), US Dept. of State, International Visitors Leadership Program, 2010
- Jury member with Freida Pinto in Dubai International Film Festival, 2011
- "Visionary of the Year", Arabian Business Awards, 2011
- Jury member at Topic Fest with Nadine Labaki, 2011
- Recognized as "500 Most Powerful Arab People", 2012
- "Top 50 Most Powerful Arab Women" Arabian Business, 2012
- "100 most powerful Arabs under 40, #48", Arabian Business Power List, 2015
- Diff 2017: IWC Filmmaker Award shortlist
- "Entrepreneur of the Year", Gulf Business Awards, September 2017
- "First Emirati to be awarded a seat at the Producers Network at the Cannes Film Festival", for the feature script Animal, 2018
- "Most Admired Leaders of Asia 2018 - Process Evaluators & Research", BARC Asia & Jury Panel, 2018
- "Top four Emirati women listed in Forbes", September 2019
- Businesswoman of the Year - Gulf Business Awards 2020
- Top 50 most powerful personalities in Arab Cinema 2021
- WIFT MENA Excellency in Cinema Honorary Award, Women in Film and TV take the spotlight at the 6th META Cinema Forum, 2023
- 14 Successful Emirati Women Who Continue to Help Build the UAE, Vogue Middle East, August 2023
- Breaking This Bias - Women Leaders Summit & Awards 2023
- Best Feature Film at the 2024 Al Ain Film Festival for Three
- Best Narrative Feature – Winner, Berlin Women Cinema Festival (2025)
- The Glitz Catalysts 2025 – Honoree (for her work as the UAE's first female filmmaker)
- Best Director – Nominee, Berlin Women Cinema Festival (2025)
- Black Swan Style Icon Award – Winner (April 2025)

== See also ==
- Manal bin Amr
