= Richie Rich (designer) =

American fashion designer

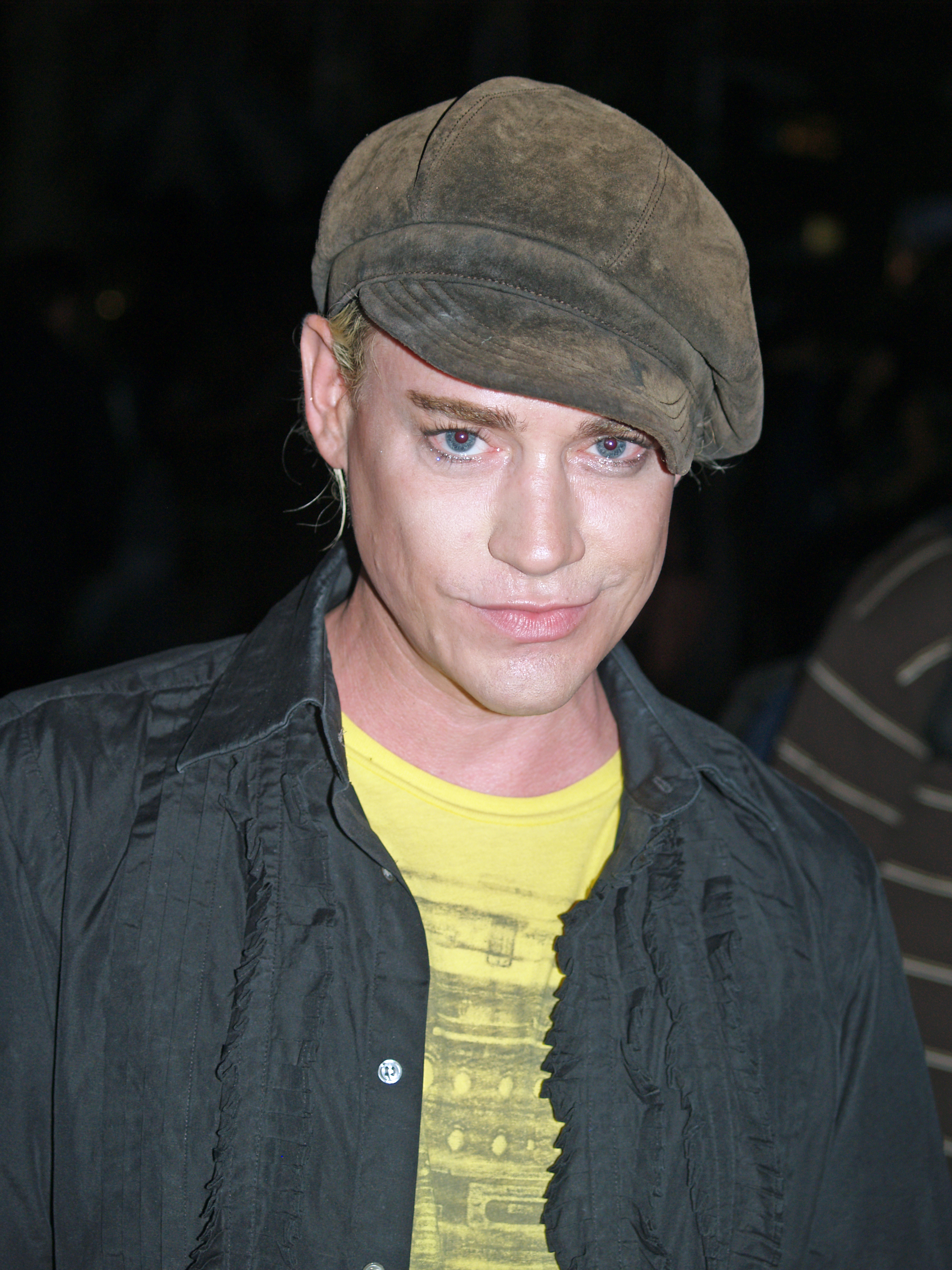
- Richie Rich in 2009
- Born: Richard Eichhorn; New Jersey, United States
- Occupations: Fashion designer; television personality; figure skater; singer
- Years active: 1993–present
- Label: Heatherette

Richard Eichhorn, professionally known as Richie Rich, is an American fashion designer, television personality, figure skater, singer, actor and author. During the 1990s, he was part of the original group of New York City club personalities named The Club Kids.

Rich was born in the New York Metropolitan Area and at a young age, his family relocated to San Francisco Bay Area where he began studying theater and competing in figure skating.

In 1999, Rich and Traver Rains founded the fashion brand Heatherette.

== Early life and discovery ==
Rich was born in New Jersey and relocated to California at 12 years old, and was raised in San Francisco Bay Area. The nickname “Richie Rich” derived from the teasing of other children.

Rich began figure skating at a young age with the Ice Capades. During his teen years, Rich would sneak out of his house to the club One Step Beyond and started go-go dancing at Club I-Beam in San Francisco's Haight-Ashbury neighborhood.

In the fall of 1992, Julie Jules encouraged Rich to enter the “Club Kid Style Summit” contest. Rich entered and won a trip to New York City to host the opening of Club USA on December 17, 1992.

== Early career ==
=== Ice Capades ===
While training under coach Christy Kjarsgaard Ness, Rich was scouted to tour as a skating performer with the Ice Capades under Sarah Kawahara.

=== Original Club Kid ===
As a club kid in the '90s and a fixture of The Limelight, Rich created a name for himself attending parties with Michael Alig and DJ Keoki, drawing attention with his theatrical clown-punk makeup and over-the-top outfits that he made himself.

== Fashion ==
=== Heatherette ===
The name Heatherette was inspired by an opera singer named Heather and the song by Grace Jones: "Warm Leatherette".

Heatherette was launched in 2001, with a runway show during New York Fashion Week featuring a video by photographer David LaChapelle, starring Amanda Lepore for a collaboration with MAC Cosmetics. Heatherette continued as a part of the official New York Fashion Week 16 times over a period of 9 years.

Heatherette has been featured in publications such as Vogue, Teen Vogue, Vanity Fair, GQ, Time, Newsweek, Glamour, Elle, People, Paper, Rolling Stone, Billboard, Trace, W, WWD, New York Times, and others.

=== MAC Cosmetics ===
On March 20, 2008, a collaboration collection with MAC Cosmetics, called "Heatherette for MAC", was released and includes illustrations of Traver Rains and Richie Rich on the cardboard packaging. The limited edition line included much more than the original collaboration. The full line included powders, lipsticks, eye shadows, eye pencils, glitter, and nail polish.

=== A*Muse, Popluxe, Villionaire ===
In 2008 Rich showed the line at the Waldorf Astoria New York Ballroom, titled "Richie Rich", with a guest appearance by Pamela Anderson. Inspired by his longtime friend, Rich and Anderson launched a capsule collection playfully titled A*Muse.

The limited collection included t-shirts and swimsuits featuring images of Anderson and Rich. They launched a fashion tour, titled A*muse, in New Zealand, Vancouver, Montreal, Toronto, Miami, and Chicago.

Rich went on to launch two collections with former business partner and fashion executive, Keri Ingvarsson and with Chris Coffee of Gotham Beauty called Popluxe.

Popluxe debuted at Lincoln Center during New York's Mercedes Benz Fashion Week, with a guest runway appearance by Ellen DeGeneres.

The second collection, called Villionaire, premiered at New York's Hammerstein Ballroom with runway appearances by Johnny Weir and MTV's JWoww.

RICHERETTE by Richie Rich

Richerette is an evolved version of Heatherette with shows in NYFW, LAFW and Art Basel.

== Television ==
In addition to appearances on the talk show circuit as a Club Kid, Joan Rivers, Geraldo and Phil Donahue. Rich was a featured role as himself on the Ashton Kutcher-produced WB series, The Beautiful Life, guest judged on multiple iterations of Top Model (America, Canada, Germany), Project Runway (America, Canada, Germany) and has appeared on various other shows such as MTV's My Super Sweet 16, Made, TRL, VH1's Supergroup, Basketball Wives, The Fabulous Life of... (Pamela Anderson and Nicky Hilton), The Anna Nicole Show on E!, MTV News, Logo TV, the Tonight Show, The Tyra Banks Show, The Today Show, Good Day New York Live, NBC's Fashion on Ice Live, appearance on Impraktical Jokers .

Filmography

- Shampoo Horns (1998)
- Zoolander (2001)
- Party Monster (2003)
- One Last Thing... (2005)
- My Super Ex-Girlfriend (2006)

== Discography ==
Single	Single details	Album
"Love You a Million"	Released: 1994 Format: Vinyl 12" Label: Unique NY Records Inc.	Love You a Million (1994)
"Magic"	Released: 1998 Format: CD, Maxi-Single, Vinyl 12" Label: Swoon Records	Non-album single
"Collision"	Released: 1999 Format: CD, Maxi-Single, Vinyl 12", Remixes Label: Swoon Records	Collision (1999)
"Celebutante"	Released: 2008 Format: CDr, Compilation, Promo Label: Defend Music Inc.	Richie Rich Presents: Celebutante (2008)
