= Traver Rains =

American actor

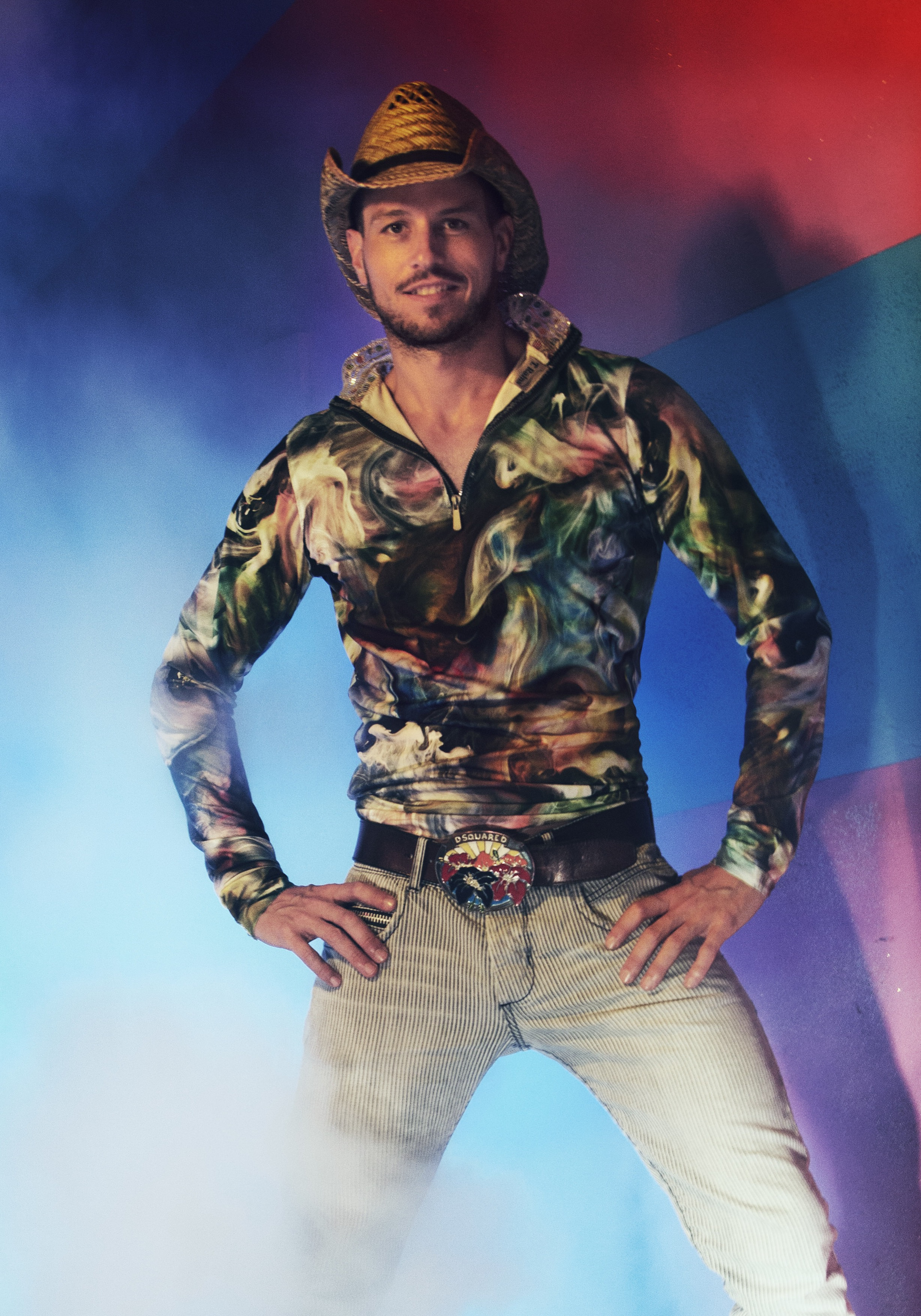
- Born: March 4, 1977 (age 49); Fort Collins, Colorado
- Occupations: Photographer, Fashion Correspondent, Designer, Heatherette
- Website: http://www.traverrains.com/

Traver Rains (born March 4, 1977) is an American TV personality, celebrity fashion designer, and photographer.

Rains grew up on a fourth generation AQHA Hall of Fame Quarter Horse ranch in Simms, Montana. He later moved to Dallas where he received a degree in Economics and International Business from Southern Methodist University. After graduating Traver found himself in New York City training horses at the Chelsea Piers where he first met club kid, Richie Rich. Together the duo founded the fashion label, Heatherette and dressed the likes of Madonna, Naomi Campbell, Gwen Stefani, Paris Hilton, Mariah Carey, Aerosmith, and Britney Spears.

== Career ==
=== Television ===
Rains was a featured judge on the third cycle of America's Next Top Model and as the designer for a fashion show contest. He was a guest judge on Project Runway Canada for the "When It Rains It Pours" challenge and also on Project Runway when contestants had to make costumes for WWE Divas. Rains' acting credits include the 2005 film One Last Thing and My Super Ex-Girlfriend. Other credits include judge on The Arrangement. Rains appeared as his brand representative on NBC's "Fashion on Ice special", The Anna Nicole Show, MTV's MADE, MTV's My Super Sweet Sixteen VH1 Super Group, The Gabulous Like of..., and Love Ride. Live appearances as a fashion correspondent include: MTV's TRL, MTV News, and Good Day LA. Special appearances include: The Tonight Show, E! News, CNN, The Today Show, Good Day New York Live, and E!.

=== Photographer ===
Currently residing in California, Rains is working as a fashion photographer in his Hollywood studio. He has recently shown his work at exhibits in San Francisco, Hollywood and Culver City. Attendees included Alan Cumming, Brian Friedman, Guy Branum, Aubrey O'Day and Erika Jayne.

Rains was featured on FashionTelevision in an interview by Jeanne Beker. As well as in Style Section LA.

=== Designer ===
Traver Rains, has also introduced a new label, T. Rains. His collection is a series of silkscreened T-shirts, tanks, and hoodies sold in exclusive boutiques and online. He presents a wearable and affordable collection reminiscent of both his western roots, a flair of pop art and some quirky humor. Many of the images seen are taken from Rains' own photography.

As co-designer/founder of Heatherette, Rains showed as part of the official New York Fashion week 16 times with his collections over a period of nine years. Outside of New York, Heatherette showed around the world in other fashion weeks including: Tokyo, Kyoto, Moscow, Miami, Mexico City, and Los Angeles. Heatherette shows were attended by hundreds of Celebrities and Taste makers, featured in virtually every fashion trade magazine worldwide. Some well known models who walked in the shows included: Naomi Campbell, Devon Aoki, Atong Arjok, Omahyra Mota, Adina Fohlin, Ai Tominaga, Alek Wek, Anouck Lepere, Bridget Hall, Caitriona Balfe, Chanel Iman, Cintia Dicker, Coco Rocha, Darla Baker, Daul Kim, Elise Crombez, Elizabeth Jagger, Erin Heatherton, Eva Herzigova, Flavia de Oliveira, Freja Beha Erichsen, Hannelore Knuts, Isabeli Fontana, Liya Kebede, Lily Cole, Lily Donaldson, Lisa Cant, Lydia Hearst, Mini Anden, Miranda Kerr, Tiiu Kuik, Heather Marks, Hanne Gaby Odiele, Caroline Trentini, Egle Tvirbutaite, Anne Vyalitsyna, Amy Wesson, Caroline Winberg, Raquel Zimmermann, among many more.

In 2007 Heatherette headlined the world-renowned AIDS charity event called the Life Ball in Vienna. This year's event was organised by Vogue Italia which retraced 20 years of Life Ball designs and featured creations from well-known designers such as Roberto Cavalli, Vivienne Westwood, Heatherette and Gianfranco Ferre. Adding to the star factor were former US President Bill Clinton, model and actress Milla Jovovich and Sudanese model Alek Wek. Last year, the event raised almost 2 million euros to finance major HIV and AIDS projects around the globe.

Rains recently collaborated with Johnny Weir to raise money for The Trevor Project. Together they designed a T-shirt with the logo "Army of One" to encourage kids to be strong and keep believing in themselves.

Trixie Mattel revealed on her YouTube channel that her RuPaul's Drag Race Season 7 finale gown was designed by Rains, whom she idolized at the beginning of her drag career.
