= Paris Hilton discography =

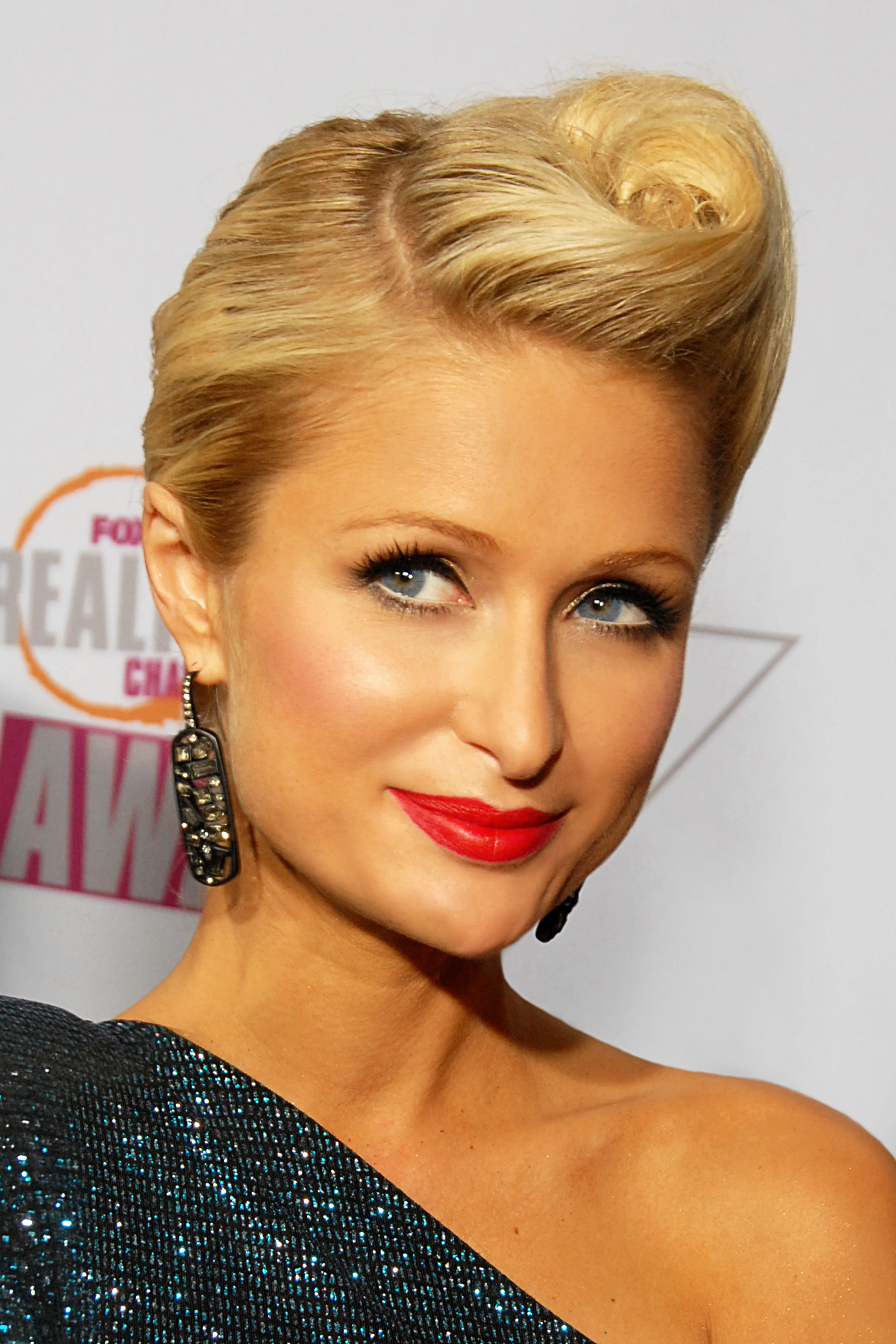
- Hilton in 2009
- Studio albums: 2
- Remix albums: 1
- Singles: 19
- Promotional singles: 3

American media personality Paris Hilton has released two studio albums, one remix album, 19 singles (including six as a featured artist), and three promotional singles.

After founding Heiress Records, a sub-label of Warner Bros. Records, Hilton released her self-titled debut album under the label on August 22, 2006. It peaked at number six on the Billboard 200, selling 77,000 copies in its first week of release. In the United States, the album had sold 198,000 copies, as of 2013. Paris also peaked within the top 20 on the album charts in New Zealand, Germany, Austria, Finland, Denmark, Sweden, Switzerland, and Canada, where it reached number four. Its lead single, "Stars Are Blind", was a critical and commercial success; it peaked at number 18 on the Billboard Hot 100, and reached number one in Hungary, Scotland, and Slovakia, as well as the top 10 in a number of European countries.

Under Cash Money Records, Hilton released a line of standalone singles. These included "Good Time" (2013), featuring Lil Wayne, and "High Off My Love" (2015), featuring Birdman, which reached the top 20 and top 5 on the Billboard Dance/Electronic Songs and Hot Dance Club Songs charts, respectively. She has also been a featured artist in Dimitri Vegas & Like Mike's "B.F.A. (Best Friend's Ass)" (2019), Nervo's "Pickle" (2021), Steve Aoki's "Lighter" (2023), and Sia's "Fame Won't Love You" (2024).

Hilton's second studio album, Infinite Icon, was released on September 6, 2024, through 11:11 Media. It reached the top 40 on the US Billboard 200 and the UK Independent Albums Chart.

== Albums ==
=== Studio albums ===
Title	Album details	Peak chart positions								Sales
Title	Album details	US	AUS	CAN	IRE	SWE	SWI	JPN	UK	Sales
Paris	Released: August 22, 2006; Label: Warner Bros.; Formats: CD, LP, digital download, cassette, streaming	6	24	4	27	6	7	8	29	US: 198,000 (Note: United States sales figures for Paris as of May 2013.)
Infinite Icon	Released: September 6, 2024; Label: 11:11 Media; Formats: CD, LP, digital download, streaming	38	—	—	—	—	—	—	— (Note: Infinite Icon did not chart on the UK Albums Chart but did peak at number 33 on the UK Album Downloads Chart.)	

=== Remix albums ===
Title	Album details
Infinite Icon: The Remixes	Released: May 30, 2025; Label: 11:11 Media; Formats: Digital download, streaming

== Singles ==
=== As lead artist ===
Title	Year	Peak chart positions								Certifications	Album
Title	Year	US	US Dance	AUS	BEL (FL)	IRE	SWE	JPN	UK	Certifications	Album
"Stars Are Blind"	2006	18	1	7	18	4	3	15	5	RIAA: Gold; GLF: Gold; IFPI DEN: Gold	Paris
"Turn It Up"	2006	—	1	—	—	—	—	—	—		Paris
"Nothing in This World"	2006	—	12	32	46	38	36	—	55		Paris
"Good Time" (featuring Lil Wayne)	2013	—	— (Note: "Good Time" did not chart on the Billboard Hot Dance Club Songs, but did peak at number 18 on the related Dance/Electronic Songs chart.)	—	—	—	—	—	—		Non-album singles
"Come Alive"	2014	—	—	—	—	—	—	—	—		Non-album singles
"High Off My Love" (featuring Birdman)	2015	—	3	—	—	—	—	—	—		Non-album singles
"I Need You"	2018	—	32	—	—	—	—	—	—		Non-album singles
"I Blame You" (featuring Lodato)	2020	—	—	—	—	—	—	—			Non-album singles
"Stars Are Blind (Paris' Version)" (solo or featuring Kim Petras)	2022	—	—	—	—	—	—	—	—		Non-album singles
"Hot One"	2023	—	—	—	—	—	—	—	—		Non-album singles
"I'm Free" (featuring Rina Sawayama)	2024	—	—	—	—	—	—	— (Note: "I'm Free" did not chart on the Oricon Singles Chart but did peak at number 16 on the Billboard Japan Hot Overseas chart.)	—		Infinite Icon
"Chasin'" (featuring Meghan Trainor)	2024	— (Note: "Chasin'" did not enter the Billboard Hot 100, but peaked at number 16 on the Adult Pop Airplay chart.)	—	—	—	—	—	—	—		Infinite Icon
"BBA" (featuring Megan Thee Stallion)	2024	—	— (Note: "BBA" did not chart on the Billboard Hot Dance Club Songs, but did peak at number 13 on the Dance/Electronic Songs chart.)	—	—	—	—	—	—		Infinite Icon
"—" denotes a recording that did not chart or was not released in that territory.

=== As featured artist ===
Title	Year	Peak chart positions			Album
Title	Year	US Dance/ Elec.	BEL (FL)	NZ Hot	Album
"B.F.A. (Best Friend's Ass)" (Dimitri Vegas & Like Mike featuring Paris Hilton)	2019	45	75	—	Non-album singles
"Lone Wolves" (Mattn featuring Paris Hilton)	2019	—	59	—	Non-album singles
"Melting" (Electric Polar Bears featuring Paris Hilton)	2021	—	—	—	Non-album singles
"Pickle" (Nervo and Tinie Tempah featuring Paris Hilton)	2021	—	—	—	Non-album singles
"Lighter" (Steve Aoki featuring Paris Hilton)	2023	—	—	—	Hiroquest 2: Double Helix
"Fame Won't Love You" (Sia featuring Paris Hilton)	2024	—	—	34	Reasonable Woman
"—" denotes a recording that did not chart or was not released in that territory.

=== Promotional singles ===
Title	Year	Album or work
"My BFF"	2008	Paris Hilton's My New BFF
"Zest (Better Than Sex)"	2021	Cooking with Paris
"That's Hot (Come into My Kitchen)"	2021	Cooking with Paris

== Other appearances ==
Title	Year	Album
"Can't Get It Up If the Girl's Breathing?" (with Terrance Zdunich)	2008	Repo! The Generic Opera: Original Motion Picture Soundtrack
"Zydrate Anatomy" (with Terrance Zdunich and Alexa Vega)	2008	Repo! The Generic Opera: Original Motion Picture Soundtrack
"Mark It Up" (with Bill Moseley and Nivek Ogre)	2008	Repo! The Generic Opera: Original Motion Picture Soundtrack
"Bravi!" (with Bill Moseley, Paul Sorvino, Sarah Brightman and Nivek Ogre)	2008	Repo! The Generic Opera: Original Motion Picture Soundtrack
"At the Opera Tonight" (with Alexa Vega, Sarah Brightman, Anthony Stewart Head, Terrance Zdunich, Bill Moseley, Paul Sorvino and Nivek Ogre)	2008	Repo! The Generic Opera: Original Motion Picture Soundtrack
"Happiness Is Not a Warm Scalpel" (with Paul Sorvino)	2009	Repo! The Genetic Opera: Original Motion Picture Soundtrack – Deluxe Edition
"All She Wants" (with Kim Petras)	2023	Problématique
