= I Need You (Paris Hilton song) =

2018 single by Paris Hilton

Single by Paris Hilton
- Released: February 14, 2018
- Genre: Doo-wop; pop
- Length: 3:35
- Label: Heiress
- Songwriters: Michael Green; Paris Hilton; Simon Wilcox
- Producer: Michael Green

Paris Hilton singles chronology
| "High Off My Love" (2015) | "I Need You" (2018) | "B.F.A. (Best Friend's Ass)" (2019) |

"I Need You" is a song recorded by American socialite Paris Hilton. Michael Green produced the song and co-wrote it with Hilton and Simon Wilcox. Heiress Records released it as a digital download on February 14, 2018. A version of the song leaked in 2010, but Hilton said she re-recorded portions of the vocals and instrumental as a dedication to her fiancé Chris Zylka. It is a doo-wop and pop ballad that features holiday-related puns about love. Green based the single's style on 1950s music.

Critics praised "I Need You", partially as a departure from Hilton's previous dance-oriented and EDM songs. The single peaked at number 32 on the Dance Club Songs chart, Hilton's fifth appearance. A music video, directed by Zylka, was released on February 14, 2018, through Hilton's YouTube account. Inspired by Marilyn Monroe's performance of "I Wanna Be Loved by You" and Jessica Rabbit, the music video features Hilton wearing lingerie, posing in a bed covered with red rose petals, and popping out of a cake. Critics described the bed scene as a homage to the 1999 film American Beauty. Remixes by other artists, including Hector Fonseca, were released to promote the track.

== Background and release ==
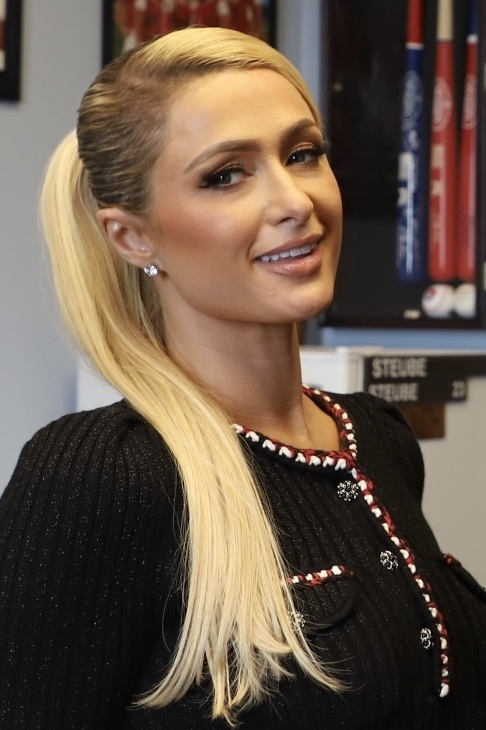
Paris Hilton (pictured in 2021) co-wrote "I Need You".

Paris Hilton became widely known in 2003 for the reality television series The Simple Life; the show's success led her to expand her career into other ventures, including creating her own record label, Heiress Records. In August 2006, Hilton released her self-titled debut album which peaked at number six on the Billboard 200 chart and performed well internationally. Following the album's release, she began work as a disc jockey in 2012 and released "Good Time" (2013), "Come Alive" (2014), and "High Off My Love" (2015) after signing a record deal with Cash Money in 2013.

Hilton co-wrote "I Need You" with its producer Michael Green and songwriter Simon Wilcox. (Note: Some media outlets erroneously reported that Hilton co-wrote "I Need You" with the Madden Brothers.) On receiving the instrumental track, Hilton wrote the lyrics in a few hours and described the process as the "first time I had someone send me a song that I immediately was like, I could write to this right away". Heiress Records digitally released it on February 14, 2018. (Note: Even though Paris Hilton was signed to Cash Money, she still released music under her own label Heiress; she explained: "I have my own record label, so when I do projects with them I can have their people and their team come in, but this I did all on my own.") "I Need You" was Hilton's first ballad and her first single in three years, following her 2015 release "High Off My Love".

A week before the song's release, Hilton posted photos from the music video on Instagram as part of a countdown. Paper's Claire Valentine wrote that Hilton was channeling Marilyn Monroe for the images, and Allure's Emily Wang considered pin-up models to be the inspirations. When describing the direction of her second album, Hilton said it would be more dance-oriented, and clarified that "I Need You" would be "the only song on there like this".

Although Hilton promoted it as a "new single" on her social media, the song leaked in 2010; music critics had believed it was a track from her second album, initially expected for release in the fall or winter of that year. Hilton said she re-recorded portions of the vocals and instrumental, and released it as a dedication to her fiancé Chris Zylka; (Note: Hilton ended the engagement in November 2018 to focus on her career.) she explained: "At that point in my life [when I wrote it], I wasn’t with anyone, so this is the perfect point in my life to release it because now the words definitely mean something." Hilton played the song for Zylka while they were driving home from the recording studio; he cried upon hearing it.

== Music and lyrics ==
"I Need You"
"I Need You" is a doo-wop and pop song and Hilton performs its lyrics with breathy vocals.

"I Need You" is a doo-wop and pop ballad that lasts three minutes and 35 seconds. Michael Green looked to 1950s music as inspiration for the composition. Hilton described "I Need You" as "the ultimate Valentine’s Day song" and said: "I've always done pop and dance music and EDM, and with this song I wanted to make something timeless and classic." Time's Raisa Bruner described its tone as "a sugary doo-wop vibe". Critics noted that Hilton uses a breathy voice throughout the song.

Through the track, Hilton sings about love and how she will "never lose sight of the reasons that I love you" and the safety felt in a relationship: "You make me want to be the woman I've always wanted to be." The lyrics feature puns about holidays, such as "I wanna be the bunny in your Easter". Other examples include: "I wanna put the happy in your birthday / And I wanna be the merry in your Christmas / I’m always giving thanks for you on every Thanksgiving." Paper's Michael Love Michael said it was about a "profound neediness" and a desire to spend a day with a significant other.

== Reception ==
"I Need You" received generally positive reviews from music critics. It was included in Vulture's list of the best songs for the week of February 14, 2018, and a playlist for 2018 Best Songs of the Week. People's Nicole Sands praised the lyrics as "written in the name of love". The song's composition was also the subject of praise. Michael Love Michael enjoyed its "featherlight doo-wop arrangement", and the Gay Times's Sam Damshenas identified the song as a "bubbly, doo-wop inspired affair". In a less enthusiastic review, Vogue Australia's Francesca Wallace wrote, "the song actually isn't too bad".

Some critics praised Hilton for pursuing a different musical style. Raisa Bruner believed a doo-wop single would surprise listeners based on Hilton's past work with pop and dance music. Citing "I Need You" as part of Hilton's "ongoing reinvention", Bruner considered it one of the top five songs released in the week of February 16, 2018. Michael Love Michael contrasted "I Need You" with Hilton's debut album, which he described as "a series of criminally underrated club-pop bangers, sex, and love jams". He praised the track as a "refreshing sonic direction" in her music career. Out magazine writer Hilton Dresden said the single reflected a "softer, moodier direction" for Hilton and thought the "over-the-top syrupy and smothering" lyrics were well suited for Valentine's Day.

Commercially, "I Need You" debuted at number 48 and peaked at number 32 on the Dance Club Songs Billboard chart. It marked Hilton's fifth appearance on the chart. According to Cait Munro of Refinery29, the song was not as commercially successful as "Stars Are Blind", which she labeled a "cult hit".

== Music video and promotion ==
Critics said a scene in the video (pictured) evoked the film American Beauty.

Chris Zylka directed and produced the single's accompanying music video, which was released on February 14, 2018, through Hilton's YouTube account. Hilton felt "more comfortable" with Zylka as the director, rather than "having some stranger behind the camera". The video was shot in February 2018, and the editing process took roughly a week. A behind the scenes video was uploaded on YouTube on May 28, 2018. Hilton explained that Marilyn Monroe, specifically her performance of "I Wanna Be Loved by You", and Jessica Rabbit inspired it.

Hilton appears in "various stages of undress" throughout the video. She is shown wearing different wigs and 1950s-inspired fashion, including several types of lingerie. (Note: For the video, Hilton wears lingerie from her own personal line.) She bakes cupcakes while wearing a polka dot apron and pops out of a cake. In another scene, she appears naked on a bed covered in red rose petals, which critics felt was an homage to the character Angela Hayes from the 1999 film American Beauty. For the shot, Hilton wears nude fish-net leggings and jewelry (Note: One of the pieces of jewelry is Hilton's engagement ring, which is 20-carats and worth $2 million.) rather than being fully naked like Hayes was in the movie. Emily Wang wrote that Hilton's outfits included "other photographic homages to classic Americana imagery", likening some of her looks in the video to those of Jayne Mansfield and Barbie dolls from the 1950s.

Remixes by disc jockeys, including Stash Konig, Dirty Disco, Nitemover, Hector Fonseca, and Zambianco, were made available to promote the track. Hilton commissioned the remixes while working as a DJ in Ibiza.

== Credits and personnel ==
Credits adapted from a Time Out article:

- Songwriting – Paris Hilton, Simon Wilcox, Michael Green
- Production – Michael Green

== Charts ==
Chart performance for "I Need You"
| Chart (2018) | Peak position |
|---|---|
| US Dance Club Songs (Billboard) | 32 |
