= Kay Poyer =

American internet personality

- Born: August 14, 2000 (age 26)

Substack information
- Newsletter: The Quiet Part
- Notes: @ladymisskay
- Years active: 2024–Present
- Subscribers: 39 thousand

TikTok information
- Page: ladymisskay_
- Years active: 2021–Present
- Followers: 998 thousand

Kayla Poyer (born August 18, 2000), known online as LadyMissKay, is an American internet personality and writer. She first gained attention in 2022 making TikTok videos. She created and co-hosted the podcast Meat Bus, and publishes writing on her Substack The Quiet Part.

== Early life and career ==
Poyer was born on August 18, 2000, and grew up in Dallas, Texas, having moved there when she was seven years old. She first began posting on TikTok in 2019 due to boredom during the Covid-19 lockdown. Her videos began to gain popularity in 2022, with her most viral video featuring Poyer giving comedic advice against restrictive eating, stating:

“You need to eat. It’s about food. It’s about fats. It’s about oils and omega 3s. Three meals a day and two snacks and a dessert if you’re nasty. If you’re kinky. That’s what it’s about.”

Dazed praised Poyer as a "skilled storyteller and comedian with a tender edge," while Dallas Observer called her "an entertainer: sharp, hilarious, interesting and unapologetically opinionated." Poyer has described the style of her TikToks as "being real even when it's bitchy," and an alternative to the "therapised advice" often offered to young women.

Poyer was included in Dazed's "Dazed 100 2024", Rolling Stone's "25 Most Influential Creators of 2025," and as "Best Comedy TikTokker" in the Dallas Observer's "Best of Dallas 2025". She was on Mashable's "Mashable 101" list for 2026, and ranked 14th in The Hollywood Reporter's "2026 Affinity 100" list.

Poyer's popularity online spurred her to create the podcast Meat Bus with her then-boyfriend. The podcast ended when the couple broke-up. She also began publishing writing on her Substack The Quiet Part, which features a mix of fiction and non-fiction pieces.

Poyer has been a guest on podcasts, including So True with Caleb Hearon, The Comment Section with Drew Afualo, StraightioLab, Upstairs Neighbors, Girls Rewatch, and Seeking Derangements. She has also appeared as a guest contestant on the internet game show Interior Motives.

Poyer is active within the New York City queer scene. In 2025 she was a guest judge at Twinks vs. Dolls, an annual wrestling competition held during NYC's Pride weekend. She has hosted nightlife events, including Essence's Affairs party in 2024, as well as PIT//STOP, Garage, and Therapy in 2026. She performed at Doll Invasion 2026, a fundraising event hosted on Fire Island.

== Personal life ==
In both videos and interviews, Poyer has been open about her experience as a transgender woman. She has spoken about being HIV positive, and has been vocal about her support for Palestine. She advocates for women's and LGBT rights with a focus on the rights of Black trans women and of queer people living in Republican states. She dislikes the label 'activist', which she believes has been "flattened" by its use on the internet, stating that activism constitutes much more than talking about sociopolitical issues online.

Poyer has previously expressed interest in beauty and perfume, horror movies and antiquing, and video games such as World of Warcraft and Skyrim.
