= Chrissy Chlapecka =

American singer and TikTok personality (born 2000)

- Born: Christine Nicole Chlapecka; April 11, 2000 (age 26); St. Charles, Illinois, U.S.
- Occupations: Singer, songwriter, TikTok personality, activist

TikTok information
- Page: chrissychlapecka
- Followers: 4.9 million
- Musical career
- Genres: Pop; hyperpop
- Years active: 2021–present
- Last updated: 2026-08-08

Christine Nicole Chlapecka (/ʃəˈpɛkə/; born April 11, 2000) is an American singer, TikTok personality, and left-wing activist. She (Note: Chlapecka uses both she/her and they/them pronouns interchangeably. This article uses she/her pronouns for consistency.) is best known as a key figure in "#BimboTok", a TikTok subculture centered on reclaiming the bimbo stereotype and aesthetic in a queer, feminist, and leftist context.

In advance of her debut single "I'm So Hot", Rolling Stone named Chlapecka one of "The Brightest Pop Stars to Watch in 2023", writing, "With notes of Paris Hilton's short-lived pop stardom and Britney Spears' Blackout, Chlapecka has the charisma to become the new reigning star of this year's dance floors."

A year later, People ranked Chlapecka on their "Talented 2024 Spring Emerging Artists" at number four.

== Biography ==
Originally from St. Charles, Illinois, Chlapecka grew up performing musical theatre and initially intended to pursue a career in it, but ultimately decided against it. She subsequently dropped out of college, and for a time worked three jobs to afford rent. Around 2021, Chlapecka began earning enough money through social media content creation to leave her job as a Starbucks barista.

=== TikTok ===
Chlapecka created her TikTok account in 2019 and began posting videos during the COVID-19 pandemic out of boredom. She first went viral with a reenactment of an uncomfortable encounter with a stranger at Walgreens, which quickly received over 500,000 likes. She gained prominence on the app through late 2022, with upbeat bimbo-themed content geared toward female and queer audiences ("girls, gays, and theys") and adamantly critical of capitalism and Donald Trump. As of early August 2026, she has over 4.9 million TikTok followers.

=== Music ===
Chlapecka began teasing her music in late 2022, and a preview of her single "I'm So Hot" went viral on TikTok. In advance of its release, Rolling Stone named Chlapecka one of "The Brightest Pop Stars to Watch in 2023", writing that she had "the charisma to become the new reigning star of this year's dance floors." The song, recorded in Los Angeles with co-writer Alexandra Veltri and producer Dallas Caton, was released on February 3, 2023.

On January 4, 2024, Chlapecka, after releasing four standalone tracks in the preceding year, initiated the promotion of her forthcoming project. Utilizing her social media platforms like Instagram and TikTok, she teased her upcoming musical venture through a five-episode miniseries of skits following the plot where she woke up to find herself stranded in a desert. These skits were unveiled periodically in the days leading up to the revelation of the extended play's lead single, titled "I'm Really Pretty", released on February 27, 2024. On April 3, 2024, she released the extended play's second single, "Verse." In addition to this, she announced that the EP would be titled Girlie Pop and revealed its release date to be June 5, 2024.

In April 2024, Chlapecka performed the vocals for drag queen Plane Jane's finale song for the 16th season of RuPaul's Drag Race, "Bodysuit". On May 15, 2024, she released the third single from Girlie Pop, "10 Boyfriends".

=== Other ===
Chlapecka has a presence on Cameo, where she sells commissioned personalized videos. From April to June 2021, Chlapecka and Craig MacNeil co-hosted the podcast Chrissy & Craig. Chlapecka had previously appeared on MacNeil's main podcast, Craig & Friends. Other podcasts she has appeared on include We're Having Gay Sex, Don't Let This Flop, and The Comment Section with Drew Afualo. Chlapecka has hosted several live comedy shows at Zanies Comedy Club in Chicago. In 2022, they appeared at Los Angeles Pride alongside Dylan Mulvaney and other TikTok creators and at VidCon, where she participated in a panel entitled "Hot Gurlz Only" with fellow TikTokers Sarah Schauer and Drew Afualo.

=== Recognition ===
Drag performer Bimini Bon-Boulash praised Chlapecka in their 2021 autobiography Release the Beast: A Drag Queen's Guide to Life, calling her "part of a new wave of women subverting [the] male gaze by playing up to the bimbo stereotype on camera while asserting their own feminist politics".

== Artistry ==
=== Style, persona, and "Bimboism" ===
Chlapecka's online persona and content center on reclaiming the traditionally sexist "bimbo" archetype. She has been credited, along with friend and fellow TikToker Griffin Maxwell Brooks, as one of the founders of #BimboTok, a community of similarly minded creators. She adopts an intentionally hyperfeminine aesthetic in her videos, including alternately platinum blonde or dyed pink hair, sometimes in pigtails; bold makeup and bright pink outfits that feature miniskirts, platform boots, and faux fur-trimmed coats and bralettes; and a breathy falsetto speaking voice often compared to pop star Ariana Grande. Her persona has been described by media outlets as a "doe-eyed, blonde-haired, pink-latex-clad, she/they viral superstar" and "if Lady Gaga were your favorite barista dishing out advice and zingers", and by Chlapecka herself as "an encouraging big sister type".

Chlapecka's content is often satirical, using sarcasm and irony to deliver sociopolitical commentary and messages of self-love and authenticity. Several videos comedically depict the perceived stupidity of the stereotypical bimbo (such as inability to spell or do math) while reframing it as a deliberate response to social and economic inequality, with lines such as "A modern-day bimbo doesn't need to know 'what a mortgage is' or 'how to file taxes,' but we do know it's time to let go those who are in prison for marijuana charges when the states that they're in have decriminalised marijuana" and "I don't know what the economy is, I don't know what supply and demand is. All I know is that our problems would be solved if we'd just print more money." Videos are also critical of capitalism, Donald Trump, Elon Musk, police brutality, the pro-life movement, and male chauvinists, while voicing support for sex workers, birth control, the LGBT community, sexual liberation, and the Black Lives Matter movement. Her content also includes relationship advice and humorous anecdotes such as getting her "clit pierced at Claire's" and buying bisexual stuffed animals from Build-A-Bear. She often ends videos with the sung catchphrase "Oh me oh my", an homage to the Slayyyter song "Mine".

Chlapecka did not initially self-identify as a "bimbo", but adopted the label when TikTok commenters began using it for her in an affirming manner. In interviews, she has presented her "bimboism" as a reclaiming of femininity and sexual autonomy, as well as a rejection of social standards in favor of embracing outsiders. Her outlook was influenced by celebrities like Paris Hilton, as well as an upbringing in which she was often dismissed as an unintelligent "bimbo". She has summarized the philosophy as "Bimboism means liberating yourself, your body, and your aesthetic to be what you want them to be without the judgment of others."

=== Musical style ===
Chlapecka cites hyperpop and 2000s pop music artists like Britney Spears, Paris Hilton, Slayyyter, Rebecca Black, Lady Gaga, Ariana Grande, and Charli XCX as musical influences. She has also cited Broadway star Bernadette Peters as an early inspiration. Speaking to Inked magazine, she said that her "brand as a musician is very similar to the brand I have on TikTok" and that her upcoming music would be "the storybook of my life....I want my music to reflect back and pay tribute to the girl I was in high school, because she really needed a big hug." She has expressed a desire to bridge the gap between hyperpop and traditional pop music. Rolling Stone described her single "I'm So Hot" as having "notes of Paris Hilton's short-lived pop stardom and Britney Spears' Blackout". She has also been compared to Prince, Kylie Minogue, Nadia Oh, and Kesha.

== Personal life ==
Chlapecka lives in Los Angeles and owns a miniature dachshund named Sugar Sparkles, which she bought in 2021.

Chlapecka previously identified as bisexual but later came out as a lesbian, and uses she/her and they/them pronouns. She has said there are "many fluid layers" to her gender and sexuality, and that she doesn't "necessarily identify as cis". Many of her videos center around her LGBTQ identity, with Chlapecka saying, "I love when people are like, 'Stop making being gay your whole identity.' [...] That's where so much of like, my confidence in myself has come from." She has also said that she was rejected by her family due to "being bi and being myself and wearing what i wear", but found acceptance in Chicago's LGBTQ community.

Chlapecka has several tattoos, including six butterflies and the phrase "Divine Feminine" on her ribs; the latter, her first tattoo, represents her embrace of femininity and rejection of patriarchy.

Chlapecka identifies as a feminist but has argued that much of the movement needs to be "reworked", citing issues such as the historic whiteness in many strains, heteronormativity, and the persistence of anti-trans voices. She has also criticized what she perceives as the gatekeeping of activism by those in higher education, arguing that shared communal knowledge and lived experience are "just as credible as reading something from a fucking book. Go ahead, be a smart person and use that to be an activist—but don't tell me my opinion doesn't count because I don't talk a certain way, or know certain things. That's about access to education, and it's classist."

Chlapecka has ADHD and anxiety, and has said that, contrary to her online persona, she is "extremely introverted" in real life.

== Discography ==
All credits adapted from Spotify and Apple Music.

=== Extended plays ===
Title	EP details
Girlie Pop	Released: June 5, 2024; Label: Self-released; Format: Digital download, streaming
Girlie Pop: Encore	Released: September 27, 2024; Label: Self-released; Format: Digital download, streaming
Christine	Released: November 21, 2025; Label: Self-released; Format: Digital download, streaming
Christine: High Voltage	Released: June 5th, 2026; Label: Self-released; Format: Digital download, streaming, CD, vinyl

=== Singles ===
Year	Title	Album	Writer(s)	Producer(s)
2023	"I'm So Hot"	Non-album singles	Christine Chlapecka, Alexandra Veltri, Dallas Caton	Dallas Caton
2023	"Alpha"	Non-album singles	Christine Chlapecka, Evangeline Miele	David Burris
2023	"Head Bitch"	Non-album singles	Christine Chlapecka, Alexandra Veltri	Dallas Caton
2023	"Brat"	Non-album singles	Christine Chlapecka, Alexandra Veltri, Dallas Caton, Maize Jane Olinger	Dallas Caton
2023	"Affection"	Non-album singles	Christine Chlapecka, Alexandra Veltri, David Burris	David Burris
2024	"I'm Really Pretty"	Girlie Pop	Christine Chlapecka, Alexandra Veltri, Dallas Caton	Dallas Caton
2024	"Verse"	Girlie Pop	Christine Chlapecka, Jesse Saint John, Alexandra Veltri, Dallas Caton	Dallas Caton
2024	"10 Boyfriends"	Girlie Pop	Alexandra Veltri, Christine Chlapecka, Dallas Caton	Dallas Caton
2024	"Sugar"	Girlie Pop	Alexandra Veltri, Christine Chlapecka, Dallas Caton	Dallas Caton
2024	"My Only Dream Is To Be Loved"	Girlie Pop: Encore	Alexandra Veltri, Christine Chlapecka, Dallas Caton	Dallas Caton
2025	"Cherry Do You Love Me"	Non-album singles	Christine Chlapecka, David Burris	David Burris
2025	"Clam Casino"	Non-album singles	Christine Chlapecka, David Burris	David Burris
2025	"Passionfruit"	Christine	Christine Chlapecka, Alexandra Veltri, Dallas Caton	Dallas Caton
2025	"Apollo"	Christine	Christine Chlapecka, Alexandra Veltri, Dallas Caton, Jesse Saint John	Dallas Caton
2025	"Aria"	Christine	Christine Chlapecka, Dallas Caton	Dallas Caton
2026	"Andromeda"	Christine: High Voltage	Christine Chlapecka, Dallas Caton	Dallas Caton
2026	"Purple Moon"	Christine: High Voltage	Christine Chlapecka, Dallas Caton, Jesse Saint John	Dallas Caton
2026	"Female Form"	Christine: High Voltage	Christine Chlapecka, Jesse Saint John	Dallas Caton
2026	"I Invented Sex"	Christine: High Voltage	Christine Chlapecka, Alexandra Veltri, Dallas Caton, Alex Chapman	Dallas Caton

=== Music videos ===
Year	Title	Director
2023	"I'm So Hot"	Sarah Gaglione
2023	"Head Bitch"	Mikey Harmon
2023	"Brat"	Michael Arellano
2023	"Affection"	Michael Arellano
2024	"I'm Really Pretty"	Michael Arellano and Mikey Harmon
2024	"Verse"	Michael Arellano and Mikey Harmon
2024	"10 Boyfriends"	Mikey Harmon
2024	"Sugar"	Mikey Harmon
2024	"My Only Dream Is To Be Loved"	Mikey Harmon
2025	"Cherry Do You Love Me"	Mikey Harmon
2025	"Passionfruit"	Mikey Harmon
2025	"Apollo"	Mikey Harmon
2025	"Aria"	Mikey Harmon
2026	"Andromeda"	Mikey Harmon
2026	"I Invented Sex"	Mikey Harmon

== Tours ==
Headlining

Girl on the Moon Tour (2026) - North America, UK, Europe
