= High Off My Love =

Single by Paris Hilton featuring Birdman
- Released: May 5, 2015
- Genre: Dance-pop; R&B; trap
- Length: 3:45 (Explicit); 3:19 (Clean)
- Label: Cash Money; Universal
- Songwriters: Paris Hilton; Charles D. Anderson; Corte "The Author" Ellis; Rondell "Mr. Beatz" Cobbs II; Bryan "Birdman" Williams
- Producer: Mr. Beatz

Paris Hilton singles chronology
"Come Alive" (2014)	"High Off My Love" (2015)	"I Need You" (2018)

Birdman singles chronology
"We Alright" (2014)	"High Off My Love" (2015)	"Respek" (2016)

Music video
- "High Off My Love" on YouTube

"High Off My Love" is a song recorded by American recording artist Paris Hilton featuring rapper Birdman. It was written by Hilton, Corte "The Author" Ellis, Charles D. Anderson and Frederick "Diji D" Allen IV, Rondell "Mr. Beatz" Cobbs II and Bryan "Birdman" Williams, with production completed by Mr. Beatz. After several delays, the song first surfaced onto the internet on May 5, 2015, when it was mistakenly released in the United States by several online music stores. It was officially released worldwide on May 15, 2015, along with a music video, by Cash Money Records.

Musically, "High Off My Love" is an up-tempo R&B and trap song, and also incorporates elements of eurodance. The song's lyrics revolve around people meeting at a party and wanting to "get high off their love". Compared to her previous two singles, it received relatively positive reviews from music critics.

The song's accompanying music video was shot in Los Angeles, California, and directed by Hannah Lux Davis. Mainly shot in black-and-white, it depicts Hilton in various bondage-themed outfits. Fifty Shades of Grey and Madonna's music video for "Justify My Love" served as its main inspirations.

== Background and release ==
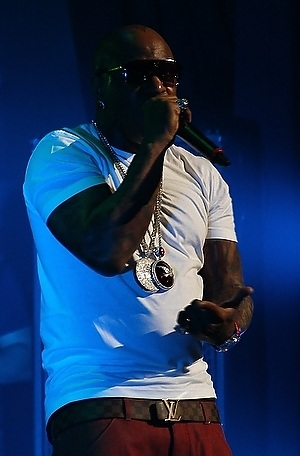
"High Off My Love" features rapper Birdman, who signed Hilton to his record label Cash Money Records.

Hilton first announced "High Off My Love" as her next single in June 2014 when she was shooting a music video for her song "Come Alive". In January 2015, it was announced that the single would be released in February 2015; Hilton later confirmed this on her Twitter account. On February 8, 2015, she spoke about the single in a red carpet interview at the 57th Annual Grammy Awards and said it would be released in March 2015. On March 18, while promoting her 18th fragrance, Hilton said the single's release date had been delayed and that it would be released either in April or May 2015 instead. Later that same month, during an interview with AllAccess at Miami Music Week, she confirmed the song was produced by Mr. Beatz and that it would be released on April 28. On April 8, however, Hilton stated the single had been pushed back and that the new release date was May 5. On April 15, she posted a preview of the music video on her Instagram. Perez Hilton posted an exclusive 14-second preview of the music video along with the artwork for the single on April 16.

Hilton also announced several contests via her Instagram where people could design the cover for the single. On April 19, Hilton tweeted that the song would be released earlier and set the new release date to May 4. On April 23, she posted another preview of the music video on her Instagram. On April 29, an extended forty-two-minute snippet of the song leaked onto the internet. On April 30, Hilton announced via her Twitter that the single had been delayed again and would be released on May 15. She explained she wanted it to be released during her stay in the United Kingdom, so she could promote the single. On May 4, a full version of "High Off My Love" surfaced online, after it was mistakenly released by several online music stores including 7digital, Amazon.com and the music streaming service Spotify. Two versions of the song were released, one featuring the rapper Birdman and a clean version without his verse. The single was later taken down from all the online stores. On May 6, Hilton posted a behind-the-scenes from the set of the music video on her YouTube channel.

== Composition ==
"High Off My Love"
A 21-second sample of "High Off My Love" featuring an EDM sound which crosses into a trap beat.

"High Off My Love" is an up-tempo dance-pop song which is influenced by EDM and trap music. It also incorporates elements of other genres such as eurodance. Set in the time signature of common time, "High Off My Love" has a moderate tempo of 133 beats per minute. It features hoover synth and pre-chorus which transitions into a trap beat.

== Critical reception ==
Compared to her previous singles "Good Time" and "Come Alive", "High Off My Love" received mostly positive reviews from critics. Hilton's vocals have been compared to those of Britney Spears.

== Music video ==
=== Background and concept ===
The music video for "High Off My Love" was released on May 15, 2015, to Hilton's official Vevo. It was directed by Hannah Lux Davis who had previously worked with Hilton on music videos for her singles "Good Time" and "Come Alive". It was shot on June 25, 2014, in Los Angeles, California. Hilton had previously announced an open casting call on her Twitter looking for models to be in the video.

The video is actually inspired by Madonna's "Justify My Love" because the song is very sexy and sexual. It's about love and how it makes me feel high. I wanted the video to be really sexy and fun, and it's completely the opposite of the "Come Alive" video. I wanted to do two separate kinds of videos.

— Hilton on the inspiration behind the music video

Hilton also cited Fifty Shades of Grey as an inspiration for the music video.

=== Synopsis and reception ===
Hilton in the music video wearing a bondage-themed outfit

The music video begins with a dark silhouette and multiple shots accompanied by heavy breath sounds. It is followed by a scene where Hilton, sporting a black coat and a beehive hairdo, walks through a hall. Different images of Hilton can be seen throughout the video. Billboard reviewed the video calling it "racy and awesomely retro, like "I'm a Slave 4 U" meets "Dirrty" – with BDSM costumes, bare midriffs and lots and lots of heavy breathing".

The video received 314,000 worldwide views in two days after its release and more than one million views in its first week.

== Live performances and promotion ==
Hilton debuted the single on May 7 at the nightclub Legends in Abu Dhabi. The single release party was announced after she cancelled her DJ performance on April 30.

She later premiered the song in Cannes at the nightclub V.I.P Room at her DJ set on May 16, 2015.

== Track listings and formats ==
- Digital download – Explicit
1. "High Off My Love" (featuring Birdman) – 3:45
- Digital download – Clean
1. "High Off My Love" – 3:19

== Credits ==
- Paris Hilton – vocals, songwriter
- Rondell "Mr. Beatz" Cobbs II – producer, songwriter
- Corte "The Author" Ellis – songwriter
- Frederick "Diji D" Allen IV – songwriter
- Charles D. Anderson - songwriter (Virginia USA)
- Bryan "Birdman" Williams – songwriter
- Andrew B. Allen – engineer, mixing

== Charts ==
=== Weekly charts ===
Chart (2015)	Peak position
US Dance Club Songs (Billboard)	3
US Hot Dance/Electronic Songs (Billboard)	35

== Release history ==
Region	Date	Format	Label
United States	May 4, 2015	Digital download	Cash Money Records
Worldwide	May 15, 2015	Digital download	Cash Money Records
