= Griffin Maxwell Brooks =

American college diver, TikTok influencer, and socialite

- Born: December 8, 2000 (age 25); Berkeley Heights, New Jersey
- Education: Princeton University
- Occupations: College diver; TikTok influencer; socialite
- Years active: 2020–present
- Employer: Susanne Bartsch
- Known for: College athletics at Princeton; TikTok content surrounding comedy, fashion, and social justice; Nightlife producer and socialite with Susanne Bartsch

TikTok information
- Page: griffinmaxwellbrooks
- Followers: 1.2 million
- Last updated: May 10, 2025

Griffin Maxwell Brooks (born December 8, 2000) is an American college diver, TikTok influencer, and self-described "digital club kid" and socialite. A Division I former diver and engineering graduate from Princeton University, they (Note: Brooks identifies as non-binary and uses they/them pronouns.) are known for TikTok videos focusing on comedy, fashion, and social justice through an LGBT lens, and as a figure in New York City nightlife, including working with event producer Susanne Bartsch. On TikTok, they have over one million followers and have been credited, along with Chrissy Chlapecka, as a key figure of "BimboTok", an online community seeking to reclaim the bimbo stereotype in a leftist and Gen Z fashion.

== Early life ==
Brooks grew up in Berkeley Heights, New Jersey, a community they have described as "semi-conservative". They are Jewish and were raised by atheist parents. Brooks experienced homophobia both at home and at school and viewed diving as a respite from the loneliness of growing up queer in such an environment. They matriculated at Union County Magnet High School, a small application-based public school for STEM students, where they first studied engineering.

== Career ==
=== College athletics and study ===
As a student at Princeton University, Brooks was a diver with the Princeton Tigers varsity men's diving team. During the 2019–2020 season, they advanced to the final on both the one-meter and three-meter dives at the Ivy League Championships, finishing seventh on the one-meter with a score of 292.25 and 11th on the three-meter with a score of 323.10. They also had high scores of 226.40 on the 10m dive at Princeton's Big Al Invitational; 327.68 on the one-meter against the Villanova Wildcats; and 369.32 on the three-meter against the Columbia Lions. After missing the 2020–21 season due to the COVID-19 pandemic, they returned for the 2021–22 season, in which they scored a season high of 336.83 points on the one-meter against the Navy Midshipmen, and 361.05 on the 3m in a tri-meet against the Brown Bears and the Dartmouth Big Green. They once again advanced to the finals of the Ivy League Championships, with the Tigers placing second behind the Harvard Crimson and Brooks placing fourth with a 355.55 score on the three-meter dive and 7th with a 292.95 score on the one-meter. They were also one of five divers to represent Princeton at the 2022 NCAA Zone A Championships, placing 15th on both the one-meter and three-meter events (scoring 572.90 and 634.40 respectively).

Brooks has been noted for their open queerness and gender non-conformity within college sports, such as their Princeton Athletics headshot during the 2021–22 season showing them with black eyeliner, a pearl necklace, earrings, and pink-streaked hair. DNA wrote of Brooks, "By way of being a proud queer person, they are carving a very public stance against traditional notions of being an athlete." While Brooks has noted that teammates are largely supportive of their identity, they have criticized their treatment by opposing teams as well as the general state of queer acceptance at Princeton, saying in a December 2021 TikTok that "as a queer, and gender nonconforming person, I often feel unvalued, unwelcome, and sometimes unsafe here at Princeton University." They expressed support for fellow trans Division I swimmer Lia Thomas during the public debate her success sparked.

Outside of diving, Brooks graduated with a mechanical and aerospace engineering major in 2023. They have spoken of their commitment to pursuing an engineering career, saying "I might do, you know, 10 years of being a socialite and then I’m like ‘okay, time to be an engineer.'"

=== TikTok ===
Brooks gained popularity on TikTok during the COVID-19 pandemic, and by May 2022 they had over 1 million followers on the platform. Their content focuses on comedy, fashion, and social justice through an LGBT lens, including outfit of the day videos, humorous monologues, and documenting of their experiences as a college student and nightlife figure. Outsports described their content as "an effervescent collection of comedic relief, bold fashion choices and social justice stands", while The Daily Princetonian noted their "affirmational positivity, tongue-in-cheek confidence, and fiercely independent expression" and called them "a digital flagbearer for Gen Z’s queer community." Brooks, who self-identifies as a "bimbo", has been credited alongside Chrissy Chlapecka as a leading figure in "BimboTok", a TikTok community reclaiming the archetype in a queer and anti-capitalist context.

In one February 6, 2022 TikTok, Brooks gave a humorous "marketing pitch" to "yassify" the racing company NASCAR, suggesting the name "YASCAR". In response, the company chose to partner with Brooks for Pride Month on a YASCAR marketing campaign and line of merchandise promoting LGBTQ acceptance. Discussing the campaign with Outsports, Brooks said, “In the midst of corporate pride being a point of fair criticism, it was sort of refreshing to have a point of contact with queer people at a really big company whose fanbase is typically not that embracive of queer people."

=== Nightlife and fashion ===
A self-described socialite and "digital club kid", Brooks is a figure in New York City's nightlife and fashion scene. Since summer 2021, they have worked with event producer Susanne Bartsch, including co-hosting events with her, making regular appearances at her Manhattan parties, and running her TikTok account. They are known for their eccentric fashion sense, which they have described as "eclectic, flashy, over the top [...] Some might say camp."

Brooks began clubbing after COVID-19 restrictions were lifted, beginning with an anniversary party for Lady Gaga's Born This Way album where they wore a Gaga-inspired look. These parties also marked Brooks' first in-person interactions with their TikTok fans, which they described as "pivotal for me. I had never been in a space like that where the idea of standing out was celebrated”. In May 2022 they attended the Met Gala afterparty, where they were noticed by musician Anderson .Paak. In September, Brooks made their New York Fashion Week debut at the Vogue World show wearing a Stella McCartney/Mylo outfit, where they introduced themselves to Vogue editor Anna Wintour. That same month, Brooks attended the Coach x VOGUE World afterparty atop The Standard, also attended by Lil Nas X, Ansel Elgort, Caroline Trentini, Jeremy O. Harris, and Stuart Vevers; Brooks was photographed with fellow TikToker Davis Burleson. In November, they attended the Humane Society's To The Rescue! gala wearing a dress from sustainable fashion designer Collina Strada; the event was hosted by Andy Cohen at Cipriani 42nd Street, with other attendees including Justin Theroux, Amy Sedaris, and Cory Booker.

== Personal life ==
Brooks identifies as non-binary, gay, genderfluid, and transfeminine and uses they/them pronouns.
