= Antoni Bumba =

American influencer and astrologer

- Born: Raleigh, North Carolina
- Occupations: Influencer; Astrologer

Antoni Bumba is an American influencer and astrologer best known for her (Note: Bumba previously identified as nonbinary and used they/them pronouns. However, as of 2025, she identifies as a transgender woman and uses she/her pronouns.) TikTok channel. She has been described as an "it-girl". She was listed on the TikTok Discover List in 2021.

== Biography ==
Bumba was raised in Raleigh, North Carolina. She has spoken about how her mother smelled like oranges when she was growing up.

Bumba became a creator. She also became known by the moniker "Girl with a beard". At that time, she created vlogs and pop culture-focused videos.

Bumba is also known as a "TikTok-famous astrologer".

Bumba rose to prominence upon creating the popular BBL Effect meme, with a character inspired by people who had received Brazilian butt lifts. Bumba also created content focused on beauty.

In 2021, Bumba teamed up with DKNY to advertise clothes about asking pronouns. That same year, Bumba was listed on the inaugural TikTok Discover list of 50 creators. She was also listed on the TikTok Creator Spotlight in 2021. At that time, she still identified as non-binary and used they/them pronouns. Her "BBL Effect" trend was also ranked on the 11 Best Gay Internet Moments of 2021 by Them.

In 2022, she hosted the podcast Reading the Stars with Antoni Bumba; guests included Drew Afualo and Dylan Mulvaney. She was described as an "it-girl" by Vox in 2023.

In 2023, she had facial liposuction, which she widely advertised on social media and called a "chin BBL". In 2025, she underwent non-surgical breast enhancement.

In 2025, she gained attention for calling out what she has claimed is inequality in company partnerships and PR packages in the influencer industry.

She has stated that the first thing she does when she wakes up is pray. She has described herself as the Black Bridget Jones.

She is a transgender woman.
