= Girlie Pop =

EP by Chrissy Chlapecka
- Released: June 5, 2024
- Genre: Hyperpop; electropop
- Length: 17:18
- Producer: Dallas Caton; Dave Burris

Singles from Girlie Pop
- 1. "I'm Really Pretty" Released: February 27, 2024; 2. "Verse" Released: April 3, 2024; 3. "10 Boyfriends" Released: May 15, 2024; 4. "Sugar" Released: June 5, 2024; 5. "My Only Dream Is To Be Loved" Released: September 27, 2024

Girlie Pop is the debut extended play by American singer and TikTok personality Chrissy Chlapecka, released on June 5, 2024. With hyper-pop beats, it lyrically blends humor, hyper-feminity, and high camp.

On September 27, 2024, Chlapecka released a deluxe edition of the EP, titled Girlie Pop: Encore.

== Composition ==
Girlie Pop is a hyper-pop EP, citing influences from Paris Hilton, Britney Spears, and Chlapecka's Broadway idol Bernadette Peters. In an interview with Paper Magazine in June 2024, Chlapecka stated that Girlie Pop is "...girly, fun, campy, cheeky self-love music that makes you wanna dance". Dallas Caton oversaw production and writing of the EP, which features songs co-written with Chlapecka, Alexandra Veltri, Michael Arellano, and Jesse Saint John.

== Track listing ==
Track listing and credits adapted from Apple Music and Spotify.

Girlie Pop – standard edition track listing
No.	Title	Writer(s)	Producer(s)	Length
1.	"Girlie Pop"	Chrissy Chlapecka; Alexandra Veltri; Dallas Caton	Caton	3:46
2.	"Verse"	Chlapecka; Veltri; Caton; Jesse Saint John	Caton	2:09
3.	"Sugar"	Chlapecka; Veltri; Caton	Caton	2:41
4.	"Emergency"	Chlapecka; Veltri; Caton; Michael Arellano	Caton	2:31
5.	"I'm Really Pretty"	Chlapecka; Veltri; Caton	Caton	2:44
6.	"10 Boyfriends"	Chlapecka; Veltri; Caton	Caton	3:20
Total length:				17:18

Girlie Pop: Encore – deluxe edition
No.	Title	Writer(s)	Producer(s)	Length
7.	"My Only Dream Is To Be Loved"	Chlapecka; Veltri; Caton	Caton	3:00
8.	"The One Who Gets To Cry"	Chlapecka; Dave Burris; Eva Honey	Burris	4:06
9.	"I Only Want You"	Chlapecka; Veltri; Caton; Jesse Saint John	Caton	3:51
Total length:				28:15
