= Drew Afualo =

American TikToker and podcaster (born 1995)

- Afualo in 2026
- Born: Drew Tyson Afualo; September 18, 1995 (age 31); Inland Empire, California, U.S.
- Other name: Drew Afualo-Tanuvasa
- Education: University of Hawaiʻi at Mānoa
- Occupations: Tiktok creator, influencer, podcaster, author
- Known for: TikTok videos
- Spouse: Pili Tanuvasa (m. 2026)

TikTok information
- Page: drewafualo
- Followers: 8 million
- Last updated: 12 August 2026

Drew Tyson Afualo-Tanuvasa (née Afualo; born September 18, 1995) is an American influencer, podcaster, and author. She is known on TikTok for her videos responding to and roasting men who hold misogynistic and fatphobic viewpoints; these videos are often punctuated by her distinctive high-pitched laugh. She had over eight million TikTok followers as of March 2023. Afualo also hosts the podcasts The Comment Section, produced by Brat TV, and Two Idiot Girls with her sister Deison. As an influencer, she has provided red carpet coverage for events like the Black Adam premiere and the 95th Academy Awards.

== Early life ==
Afualo was born to Tait and Noelle Afualo and raised in Corona, California located in Southern California's Inland Empire area. She graduated from Centennial High School in 2012. She grew up in a Samoan family, the middle child between an older sister, Deison, and a younger brother, Donovan. Her father, Tait, grew up in Samoa and played American football professionally, as did her grandfather, uncle, and many other men in her family. She has described her child self as "strong-willed", "bossy", and a "know-it-all", and credits her family and Samoan heritage for instilling her self-confidence, sense of humor, and feminist viewpoint.

Initially seeking a career in sports journalism as "the next Bob Costas", Afualo attended the University of Hawaiʻi at Mānoa, where she was the sports editor of the student newspaper Ka Leo O Hawaiʻi, worked for the school's athletics department, and appeared regularly at March Madness and Pac-12 Conference sporting events. She graduated with a communications degree in sports and journalism. Her first job as an undergrad was doing public relations for a construction company. At 23, she was hired as a digital media coordinator and content creator for the NFL, something she had seen as a "dream job", but she became disillusioned with the work and was laid off after ten months, shortly before the COVID-19 pandemic.

== Career ==
=== TikTok ===
Afualo joined TikTok in March 2020 at the encouragement of her boyfriend, who had seen her rants about college life she had posted to Snapchat. She initially ran the account casually, posting a handful of personal dating stories for a smaller audience, before going viral in early 2021 with a video in which she listed "very specific red flags" in men. The video attracted a large number of hate comments from male viewers, and Afualo's series of response videos to these comments gained her a newfound audience. Her follower count subsequently expanded from 1.5 million to 4 million in the span of two months, and would ultimately surpass 8 million as of March 2023. Additionally, she has over 90,000 followers on Twitter and over 530,000 on Instagram.

Afualo's TikTok videos typically consist of her responding to, mocking, and roasting men who express misogynistic, fatphobic, racist, transphobic, and otherwise bigoted views, earning her nicknames such as "crusader for women", "defender of women", and "Queen of the Roasts". Her videos often feature her signature high-pitched giggle-laugh, described as "a staccato, full-chested explosion of high-pitched emotion and outrage". Afualo herself characterizes it as a natural Polynesian laugh, calling it "unmistakably Islander". Since mid-2022 she has been a full-time content creator, earning a living from views, advertisements, and brand sponsorships.

Afualo was one of several online influencers spotlighted in eTalk Daily's "Influenced" television special, including Alex Cooper, Jaboukie Young-White, Megan Stalter, and Donté Colley. She was also included in TikTok's International Women's Day creator spotlight alongside Molly Burke and Dylan Mulvaney, in the app's 2022 Discover List, and in Meta's "Creators of Tomorrow" list.

In August 2026, a year-old clip from Afualo's podcast resurfaced on TikTok, in which guest E.R. Fightmaster remarked that transgender women possessed a more beautiful view of womanhood than cisgender women, who Fightmaster claimed often based womenhood on cisgender women's ability to be sexually assaulted. The clip sparked controversy and claims of misogyny, with Afualo reaffirming support for Fightmaster. The controversy was later described as a "bad-faith recirculation of the clip by right-wing accounts.

=== Podcasting ===
Afualo hosts the podcast The Comment Section with Drew Afualo, originally created in 2021 for Brat TV's Past Your Bedtime YouTube channel. The podcast consists of Afualo interviewing fellow online creators and media figures about feminist issues, misogyny, relationships, and empowerment. Notable guests have included Brittany Broski, Kamie Crawford, Jackie Aina, Chappell Roan, Melissa Ong, Manny MUA, Pokimane, Trixie Mattel, Johnny Sibilly, and InStyle social media host Tefi Pessoa. On March 8, 2023, Tubefilter reported that Spotify had signed a deal with Afualo for The Comment Section to become a Spotify exclusive starting April 5. The show's first season on Spotify saw guests including Bretman Rock, Meghan Trainor, Shea Couleé, Monét X Change, and Tess Holliday.

Additionally, Afualo and her sister Deison co-host the podcast Two Idiot Girls, where they discuss topics such as media representation of minorities, racism, internalized misogyny, and mental health in both serious and light-hearted ways. Drew mentioned in a May 2022 interview that the podcast had been signed to a "major company". In January 2023, a Two Idiot Girls live show was held at the House of Blues in San Diego.

Both The Comment Section and Two Idiot Girls were nominated for the 15th annual Shorty Awards in the Comedy Podcast category.

Outside of her own shows, Afualo has been a guest on podcasts including Kamie Crawford's Relationshit, Emily Ratajkowski's High Low: Talk Back, DeuxMoi's Deux U, Triple J's The Hook Up, Spencewuah's I'm Literally Screaming, Antoni Bumba's Reading the Stars, Morgan Absher's Two Hot Takes, and Christy Carlson Romano's Vulnerable.

=== Other work ===
Afualo made her first VidCon appearance in June 2022, hosting the panel "Hot Gurlz Only" with fellow TikTokers Chrissy Chlapecka and Sarah Schauer. In October 2022, she published an op-ed in the Los Angeles Times entitled "How to confront bigots on social media — and win". Later that month, Afualo attended the New York City premiere of the film Black Adam as a red carpet host, where she interviewed the film's star, Dwayne Johnson. She also appeared in Meghan Trainor's "Made You Look" music video alongside Scott Hoying, Chris Olsen, and JoJo Siwa. Known for her roasts on TikTok, Afualo was the subject of her own roast by the members of Smosh in a YouTube video entitled "Drew Afualo is Dead – The Funeral Roast".

She and four other TikTokers were interviewed by Trevi Moran for SmashBox Cosmetics' Prime Time TV: 5 Seconds to Great Skin!, a TikTok series on skin care.

In March 2023, Afualo and fellow TikTokers Reece Feldman and Khaby Lame were invited to cover the 95th Academy Awards pre-show red carpet alongside YouTuber Lilly Singh; Afualo interviewed Jamie Lee Curtis and once again encountered Dwayne Johnson.

Afualo told Teen Vogue in April 2023 that she was writing a book, in partnership with Questlove's publishing imprint. Afualo published a book, entitled Loud: Accept Nothing Less than the Life You Deserve on July 30th, 2024. She became a New York Times Best-Seller shortly after.

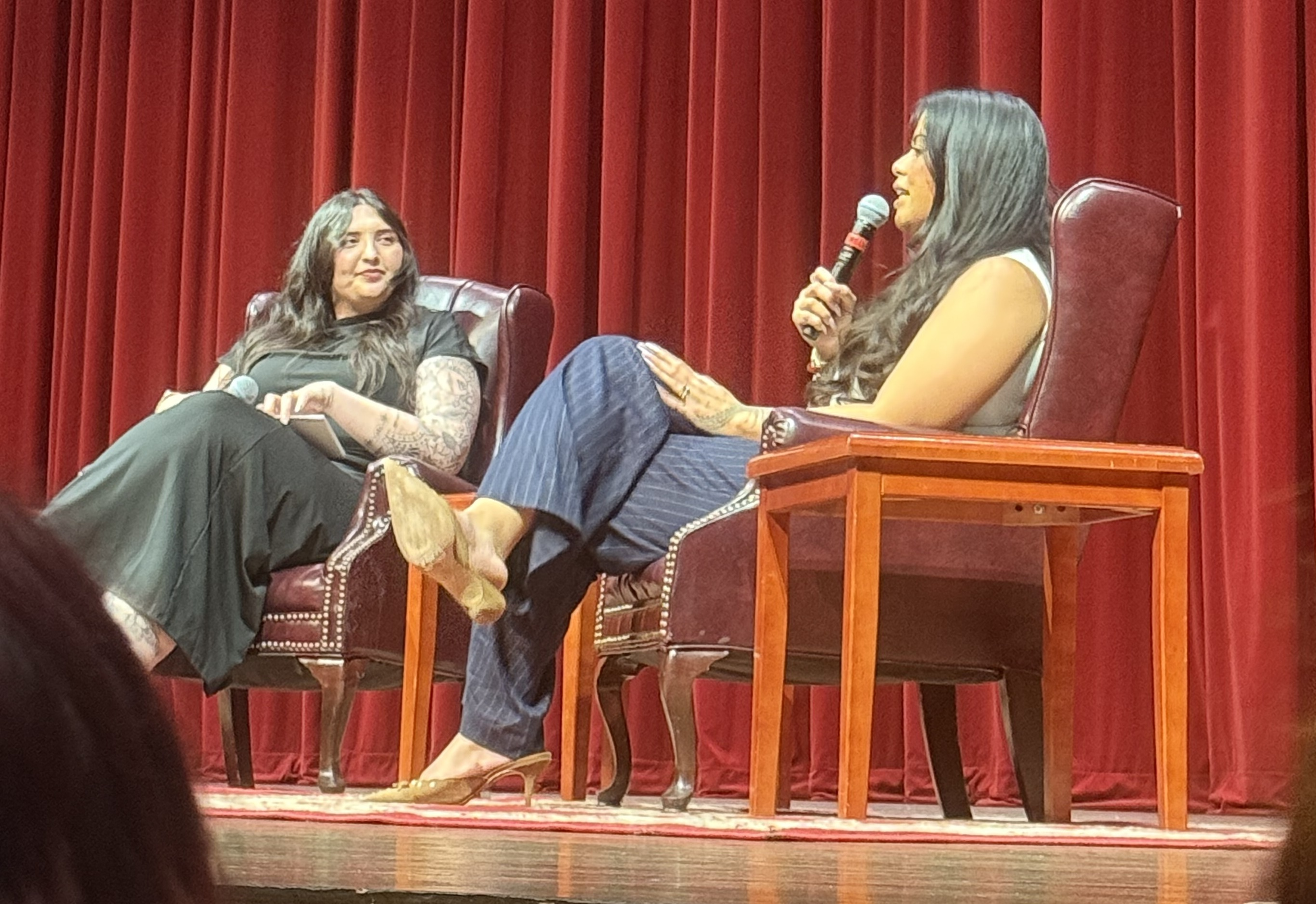
Drew Afualo in the Golden Torch Lecture Series at Florida State University on March 4th, 2026

On March 4th, 2026, Afualo was the guest speaker at Florida State University's Golden Torch Lecture Series. She discussed how her childhood, experience, and career shaped her perspective on intersectional feminism. She also spoke about her start on TikTok and how it progressed. Afterwards, there was a Q&A session with college students in attendance.

Afualo playing a game for charity at the 2026 KC Tenants Yeehaw variety show.

She has often expressed interest in hosting a talk show.

== Personal life ==
Afualo lives in Southern California. In August 2026, she married her partner of nine years, Pili Tanuvasa. She has two pet French Bulldogs named Squid and Tuna.

Afualo is outspoken about her Samoan heritage, crediting it for her headstrong nature and desire to uplift women. While covering the Black Adam premiere, she wore a custom dress by Samoan designer Nancy Elizabeth that incorporated a tapa cloth corset and spoke Samoan to actor Dwayne Johnson. She has a malu, a tattoo traditionally reserved for Samoan women of royal blood, on the back of her left hand. In addition to Johnson, she has cited Parris Goebel as an important Samoan inspiration, having seen the choreographer wear a puletasi to the MTV Video Music Awards growing up.

Often the subject of online criticism and backlash, Afualo uses daily affirmations to help maintain her self-confidence. She is a fan of rapper Megan Thee Stallion, of Disney films like Monsters, Inc. and Ratatouille, and of the video game Ghost of Tsushima. She has noted that she is "a lot more laid back" than her online persona.

Afualo is a supporter of intersectional feminism. She has said that, while she supports body positivity, she leans "more towards body neutrality, which in essence just means your body just is what it is. It just exists. It has no bearing or reflection on you as a person, your character, your worth — nothing. It's just keeping you alive". During a May 2022 New York Times interview, Afualo condemned the potential overturning of Roe v. Wade, calling it "terrible" and "horrifying". In an October 2022 TikTok video, she described her past experiences of sexual harassment, saying that she had "made a promise to herself" to "never [...] waste time being nice to a man who doesn't deserve it— especially when I'm alone, and especially when I'm in public. Because you know what the stories I have all have in common? There were hundreds of men standing around, watching it happen".
