= Pop out cake =

Oversized confection concealing a person inside

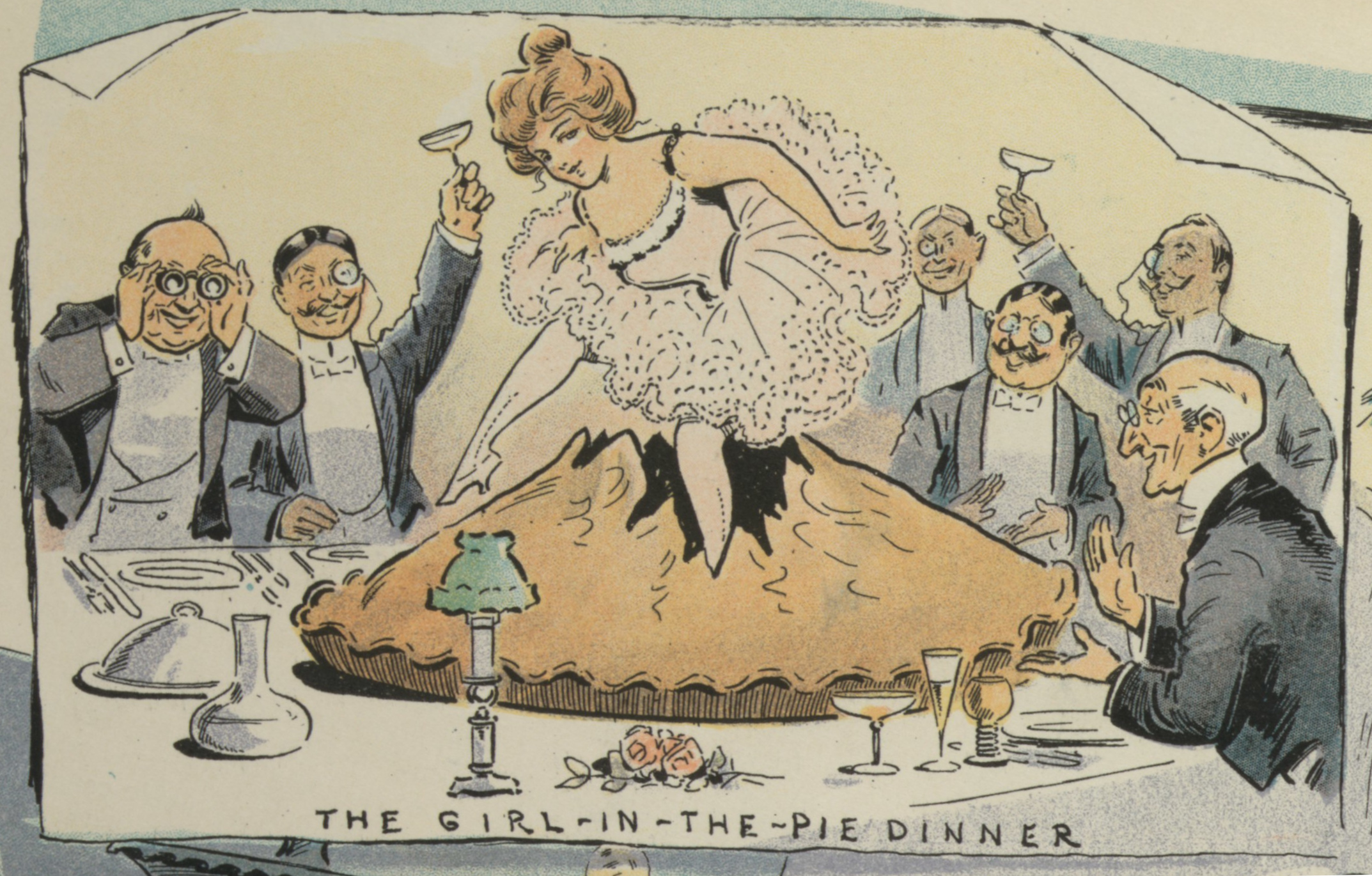
A 'girl-in-the-pie dinner' portrayed in Puck magazine, 1903

A pop out cake, popout cake, jump out cake, or surprise cake is a large object made to serve as a surprise for a celebratory occasion. Externally, such a construction appears to be an oversized cake, and sometimes actually is, at least in part. However, the construction is usually cardboard. The inside of the object has a space for someone, typically a woman, to crouch and hide until the moment of surprise, when she then stands up and comes out of the cake.

== History ==
The ancient Roman people held feasts featuring meat of one animal stuffed inside another. Eventually, Petronius attempted to make it look as if the animals stuffed inside appeared to be alive. In medieval Europe, the entremets, a between-courses dish, developed into a form of entertainment, which could include the presentation of a pie with live animals, such as doves and frogs, bursting out. Such spectacles were known as early as the 15th century and continued into the 18th century, when it was memorialized in the nursery rhyme "Sing a Song of Sixpence," wherein live blackbirds are placed in a pie shell to be served for a king's feast.

On 5 November 1626, the Duke and Duchess of Buckingham presented King Charles I of England and Queen Henrietta Maria with a pie from which sprang the dwarf Jeffrey Hudson, in a suit of armor. (Note: On his seventh birthday, in 1626, Jeffrey Hudson was presented to the Duchess of Buckingham as a "rarity of nature" and she invited him to join the household. A few months later, the Duke and Duchess entertained King Charles and his young French wife, Queen Henrietta Maria, in London. The climax of the lavish banquet was the presentation of Jeffrey to the Queen, served in a large pie. When the pie was placed in front of the Queen, Jeffrey arose from the crust, 18 inches (45 cm) tall and dressed in a miniature suit of armour. The Queen was delighted and the Duke and Duchess of Buckingham offered Hudson to her as an amusing gift. In the 1943 German film Münchhausen, a state banquet given by Catherine the Great reprises the incident: a giant pie containing a dwarf who plays on a miniature piano.)

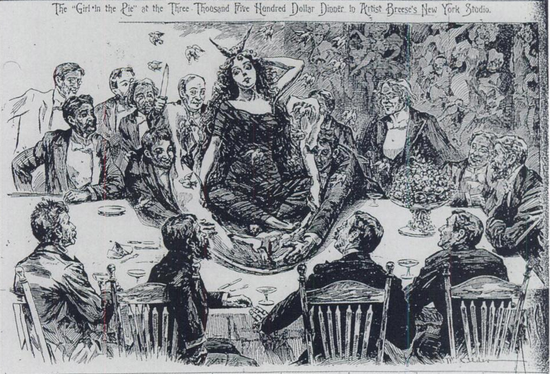
"The Girl in the Pie", The World, 1895

From the 19th century onwards, pop out cakes exclusively involved attractive young women jumping out during decadent parties. The concept became notorious after Stanford White put on a dinner on May 20, 1895, that included a scantily-clad girl, Susie Johnson, emerging from a pie made from galvanized iron, accompanied by a recitation of "Sing a Song of Sixpence". (Note: "The pie bearers advanced solemnly down the center of the room, and after much shuffling of chairs deposited their burden in the center of the table. It was apparently a beautiful pie of mammoth size, but not of the ordinary shape. The crust was brown and flaky, and the aroma was delicious. The head waiter, with a solemnity and importance born of the possession of a stupendous secret, advanced to the table, and with a quick movement cut the crust of the pie with a silver knife. The pie divided as if by magic, and, falling apart, disclosed Susie Johnson, the sixteen-year-old model. A great bevy of canaries, which had been inclosed with her, flew into the room and perched on the easels, on the pictures, anywhere they could find refuge. Then there was a great shout [...] and the young model was lifted from the table to the floor. She was dressed in filmy black gauze. [...] The pie was examined with due care, and it was found to be in reality a sphere of galvanized iron covered with a crust of pastry." (1895 wire story)) A few months later, the "Pie Girl" having disappeared, The World ran a lurid expose of the episode that emphasized the prominence of the guests, who included Nikola Tesla and Charles Dana Gibson, and the scandalous nature of White's affairs. White himself was eventually murdered by Harry Thaw, the husband of White's former lover, Evelyn Nesbit. The episode became "a sign for the decadence of art and high society."

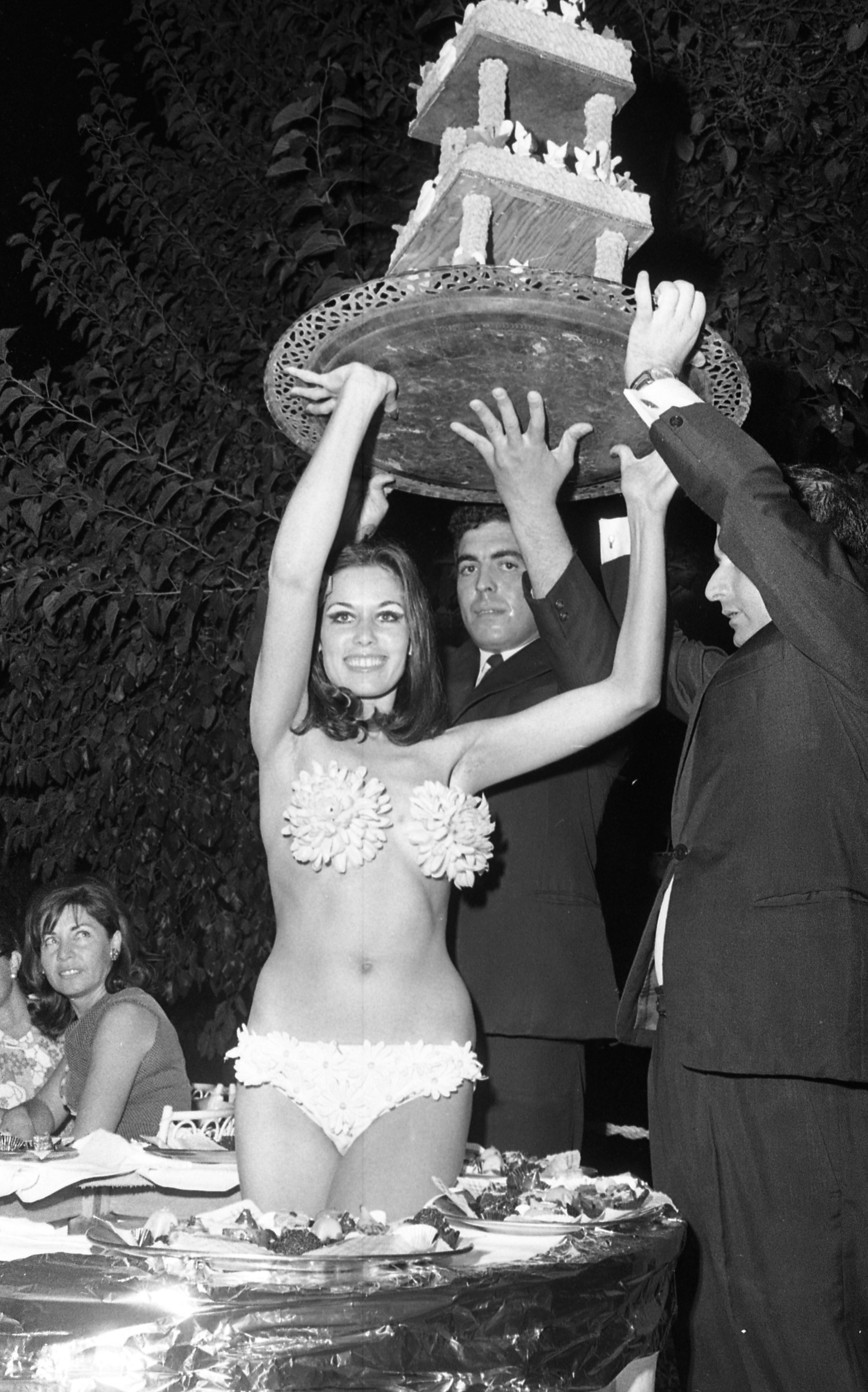
Pop out cake at a restaurant opening in Jaffa, Israel (c. 1969)

A 1927 show at the famous French cabaret Moulin Rouge had a grand opening consisting in dozens of female dancers popping out of huge multi-tiered artificial cakes covered in real frosting. However, when the girls descended to the stage, the soles of their high heels were covered with frosting, which proved slippery and caused them to fall on stage, ruining the show.

By the 1950s, women popping out of cakes was common during various social events such as office gatherings, conventions and bachelor parties. It eventually became common for showgirls to pop out of cakes for celebratory occasions.

By the 1970s, the popularity of the pop-out cake declined due to changing social values. However, it has remained part of pop culture, and the pop out cake has become something of a standard entertainment at bachelorette and bachelor parties.

== Specificities ==
Pop out cakes must be large enough to contain a woman in a squatting position, but not too high in order to allow her to gracefully get out of the cake. Sophisticated cakes can even include a little seat inside, so that the lady is more comfortable in case she has to remain in the cake for a long time before her popping out.

There are many variants in shapes, sizes and heights. For a more impressive visual effect, some pop out cakes are so tall that the lady can't get out of the cake by herself; in these cases, only the upper part of her body is exhibited, and she is meant to remain inside of the cake for some time after her popping out, until the cake is wheeled offstage later during the party. Some of the most refined pop out cakes are tall multi-tiered constructions in which the upper tiers are designed to fold down inside the bottom tier when the woman pops out, allowing her to exit the cake without difficulty. An example of such a cake can be found in the 1992 movie Under Siege. This kind of cakes with folding tiers, though commonly featured in films, TV shows, music videos and cabaret shows, are rarely used in real-life parties because the folding part tends to inconveniently drop and reveal the lady before the expected moment, in particular when the cake is tossed by the time it is wheeled onstage.

Until the beginning of the 1970s most pop out cakes were real. Things changed in 1975 when "the AP newspaper published an interview with a baker that worked making them for a small fee of $2,000. They were built around huge cylinders that could house an adult." Nowadays, the construction is generally made of corrugated cardboard, often covered with whipped cream or frosting to make them look real. This kind of pop out cakes present the advantages of being cheaper to build and easier to move, due to their lightness, but they are also much more fragile and should be handled with care. At a reception given for important members of the General Motors Company in the late 1980s, the lady who popped out of such a cake was wearing pointy stilettos, and when she stepped on the cake to get out of it, the heels of her shoes punctured the flimsy cardboard upper part and sank into the hollow structure, leading the lady to fall backwards and make the whole cake collapse.

At the opposite, expensive pop out cakes can be entirely constituted of real edible cake arranged around the central hole. The cake served at the 2018 men-only Presidents Club Charitable Trust dinner was made and hand-decorated by pastry chef Nuno Mendes, albeit the fact the woman who popped out of it was barefoot and turned out to have sweaty feet (due to the heat inside the cake) certainly prevented most people from eating it.

Different designs also exist concerning the top part: nowadays it is usually made of thin, almost flexible cardboard, which breaks into pieces when the woman jumps out; while, until the 1960s, the lid was customarily a rigid circular plate put on the top of the structure. As an example, during a high budget reception given in the early 1950s, the lady inside of the cake inadvertently threw up the lid vertically, and it fell back on her, smashing the intricate feathered headdress she was wearing.

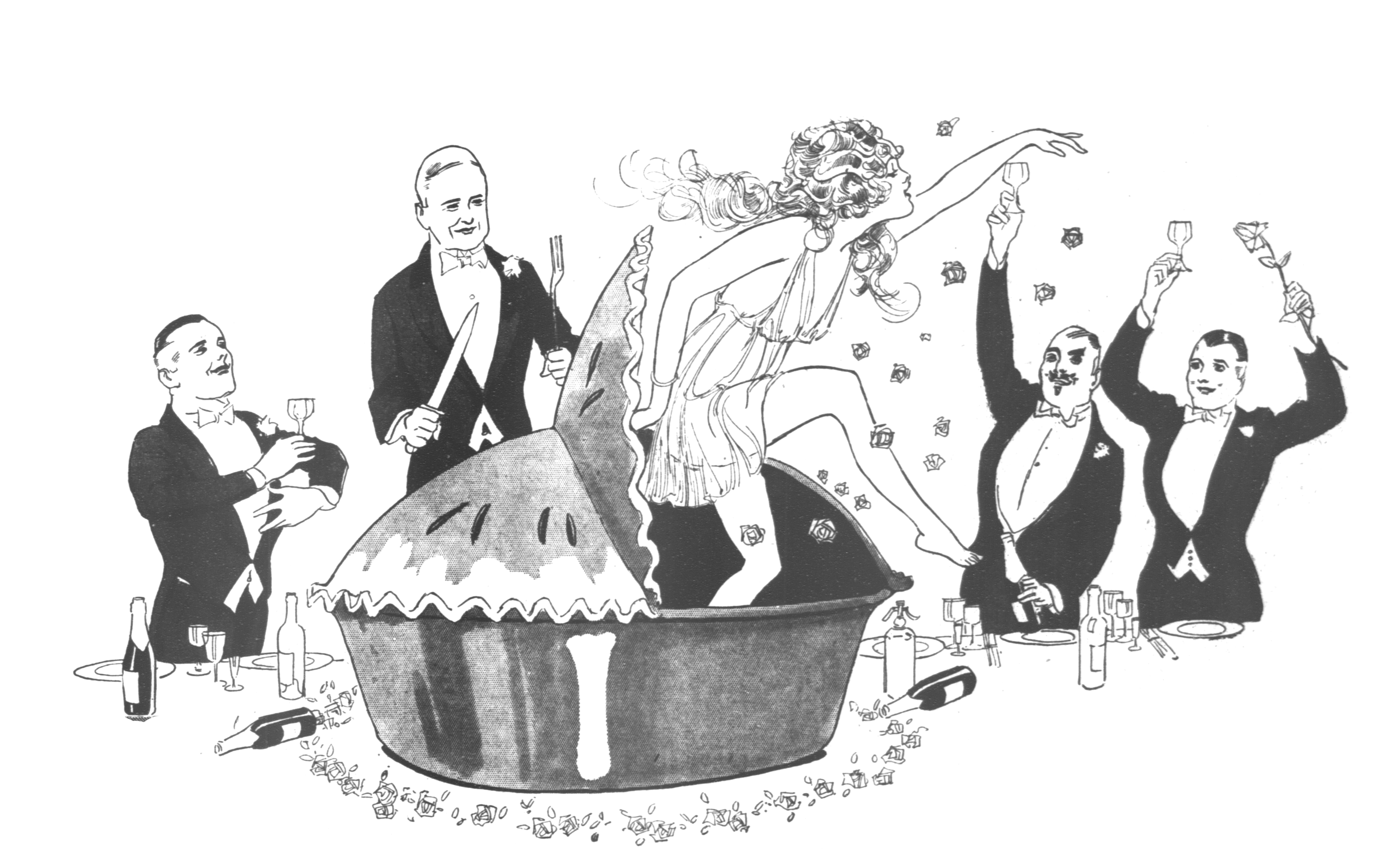
A "girl-in-the-pie" dinner, from The Washington Times: Chronicling America, 16 Feb. 1919

== Famous examples ==
Often the person jumping out of the cake is an exotic dancer, showgirl, or model during a celebration. For example, Naomi Campbell popped out of a cake in 2004 for her then-boyfriend Usher's 26th birthday party at the Rainbow Room. Comedian Bill Murray fell out of a cake in celebration of David Letterman's 2015 retirement from Late Show; Murray had been Letterman's first guest on Late Night with David Letterman when it debuted on NBC in 1982 and his first guest on Late Show with David Letterman when Letterman moved his show to CBS in 1993.

American singer Katy Perry decided to reverse the concept, diving into a giant artificial cake after her last song at the end of a 2008 performance in Guadalajara, Mexico, during the 2008 Los Premios MTV Latin America awards. She subsequently stepped in cake thrown on the stage during her stunt, which covered her ballet slippers, leading her to fall several times and crawl off the stage on her hands and knees.

The Fall-Winter 2012/2013 lingerie fashion show by Zahia Dehar, held in Paris on July 2, 2012, was divided into four themes, the second of which was entitled "Gâteaux et bonbons" ("Cakes and candy") and featured models popping out of giant artificial cupcakes before walking on the catwalk, although several of them reportedly had troubles opening the lid and remained trapped inside them until other models lifted the lids from the outside.

During the Miss Universe 2017 beauty pageant, the National Costume of Miss Curaçao, Nashaira Balentien, evoked a pop out cake, with the bottom part looking like a multi-tiered cake covered with authentic sugar, and the upper part of her body popping out on the top. During her performance onstage she had difficulty descending from the podium and stepped on her costume.

The pop out cake has been used as a metaphor. Sir Fred Hoyle was an advocate of the Steady State theory of the universe and considered theories that described a beginning as pseudoscience. When he coined the term "Big Bang" on BBC Radio for the theory that he opposed, he stated that it was as undignified a way to describe the beginnings of the Universe as "a party girl jumping out of a cake".

== In fictional works ==
Pop out cakes are a common trope, used especially in television and films. Notable examples include: In the movie Some Like It Hot (1959), starring Marilyn Monroe, in which a gangster pops out of a cake with a machine gun, killing almost everyone in the room; and pop outs by Erika Eleniak in the movie Under Siege (1992); Mariah Carey in the music video for the song "Loverboy" (2001); and The Joker in the September 11, 1992 "Joker's Favor" episode of Batman: The Animated Series.

In Game of Thrones, a pop out cake has doves fly out after Joffrey slices the cake with his sword at his wedding. A few dead birds are seen laying in or near the cake, used to show how careless and cruel Joffrey is as well as referencing the medieval tradition and Song of Sixpence.

Occasionally a joke of some kind is added, such as an old lady or a hairy man popping out of the cake, in comedies like Family Guy or The Simpsons. A macabre joke, notably featured in The Addams Family (1991), is that the woman gets inside the cake before it is baked.

An example of the pop out cake being more than an incidental element of a story can be found in Dalton City, the 49th album of the Western comics series Lucky Luke, published in 1969, in which there is the running gag of a dancing girl named Belle who is meant to pop out of a huge cake made by Averell Dalton while yelling "Youpee" during a wedding party, but she repeatedly fails to open the lid of the (abnormally hard) cake. At the very end of the album she eventually succeeds in popping out, only to see that the party is long over and everyone has left.

== See also ==
- List of cakes
- Surprise party
