= B.F.A. (Best Friend's Ass) =

2019 single by Dimitri Vegas & Like Mike featuring Paris Hilton

Single by Dimitri Vegas & Like Mike featuring Paris Hilton
- Released: 10 May 2019
- Length: 2:51
- Label: Smash the House
- Songwriter(s): Naomi Abergel; Jackie Miskanic
- Producer(s): Dimitri Vegas & Like Mike

Dimitri Vegas & Like Mike singles chronology
| "Selfish" (2019) | "B.F.A. (Best Friend's Ass)" (2019) | "Untz Untz" (2019) |

Paris Hilton singles chronology
| "I Need You" (2018) | "B.F.A. (Best Friend's Ass)" (2019) | "Lone Wolves" (2019) |

Music video
- "B.F.A. (Best Friend's Ass)" on YouTube

"B.F.A. (Best Friend's Ass)" is a song by Belgian production duo Dimitri Vegas & Like Mike featuring American media personality Paris Hilton. It was released on 10 May 2019 through Smash the House. Hilton raps on the song.

== Remixes ==
- "B.F.A. (Best Friend's Ass)" (Dimitri Vegas & Like Mike Remix) – 2:53

== Music video ==
Kim Kardashian stars in the music video, which also features drag queen and Britney Spears impersonator, Derrick Barry and transgender influencer Nikita Dragun. Part of the filming was featured on an episode of Keeping Up with the Kardashians.

== Promotion ==
Hilton tweeted a photo of herself and Kardashian on 3 May, captioning it "#SecretProject with @KimKardashian" and quoting a line from the song.

== Charts ==
| Chart (2019) | Peak position |
|---|---|
| Belgium (Ultratip Bubbling Under Flanders) | 25 |
| US Hot Dance/Electronic Songs (Billboard) | 45 |
