= Come Alive (Paris Hilton song) =

Single by Paris Hilton
- Released: July 8, 2014
- Recorded: 2012
- Genre: Electropop; dance-pop
- Length: 4:16
- Label: Cash Money; Republic
- Songwriters: Paris Hilton; Corte Ellis; Chris Richardson
- Producers: Rondell "Mr.Beatz" Cobbs; Michael "Mikey P" Puerari; Frederick C. Allen

Paris Hilton singles chronology
"Good Time" (2013)	"Come Alive" (2014)	"High Off My Love" (2015)

Audio sample
- file; help

Music video
- "Come Alive " on YouTube

"Come Alive" is a song by American recording artist Paris Hilton. It was released as the second single from her unreleased second studio album on July 8, 2014, by Cash Money Records. The song was written by Hilton, Corte Ellis, Rondell “Mr.Beatz”Cobbs, Michael "Mikey P" Puerari, Chris Richardson, and Frederick C. Allen.

== Background and promotion ==
"Come Alive" is a single from Hilton's second studio album, which was released in October 2013 with the single "Good Time" with Lil Wayne. Hilton promoted "Come Alive" on Tuesday, July 15, sharing links to the music video and thanking fans for their support via Twitter.

== Critical reception ==
Upon its release, the song received mostly positive reviews. Robbie Daw of Idolator contended, "Come Alive" lives up to its title, as it offers a more mature aesthetic than previous Hilton offerings — and, in all seriousness, she's also showing growth as a vocalist this time around." Lucas Villa of AXS also commended Hilton's serious approach to music, writing, "[s]he puts herself in the pop star lane once again with this dreamy slice of electronica." Elizabeth Freda of E! Online remarked the video as "insanely amazing" in her review, and then went on to list what she called "The Twelve Greatest Moments" of the video, some of the things she praised in the video included Paris' choice of clothing and the scenery.

== Music video ==
Hilton during the music video.

The music video for "Come Alive" was filmed in Los Angeles, California and was directed by Hannah Lux Davis. It was released on July 15, 2014. Hilton appears in various bedazzled, body-hugging ornate costumes as she runs through flower fields, swings on a flower swing, and dances in front of the moon.

Nolan Feeney of Time magazine compared sequences in the video to Katy Perry's "California Gurls" video, Basking in the red glow of a sunset while sporting voluminous hair in an open meadow like Rihanna's "Only Girl (In the World)" and Shakira "Empire", Black Swan inspired Victoria's Secret Fashion Show, a real-life Lisa Frank folder and Pokémon's Suicune. As well as comparing it to Masters of Sex opening credits sequence and Britney Spears' perfume fragrance ads.

== Track listing ==
- Digital download
1. "Come Alive" – 4:16

== Release history ==
Region	Date	Format	Label
Worldwide	July 8, 2014	Digital download	Cash Money Records
