= Good Time (Paris Hilton song) =

Single by Paris Hilton featuring Lil Wayne
- Released: October 8, 2013
- Genre: Rave, Electro house
- Length: 3:36
- Label: Cash Money; Republic
- Songwriters: Paris Hilton; Dwayne Carter; Nick van de Wall
- Producer: Afrojack

Paris Hilton singles chronology
| "Nothing in This World" (2006) | "Good Time" (2013) | "Come Alive" (2014) |

Lil Wayne singles chronology
| "Beware" (2013) | "Good Time" (2013) | "Thank You" (2013) |

Music video
- "Good Time (Explicit)" on YouTube

"Good Time" is a 2013 single by Paris Hilton from her unreleased second studio album. It was released on October 8, 2013, by Cash Money as the lead single from the record. The song was written and produced by her and Afrojack, with additional songwriting provided by Hilton and Lil Wayne. A single release party was held at SBE's Create Nightclub in Hollywood on October 8. It became her third top-20 hit on the US Billboard Hot Dance/Electronic Songs.

== Background ==
Hilton told Rolling Stone, "For me this song is so catchy and fun the way it moves from pop to a true dance number."

== Reception ==
Professional ratings
Review scores
| Source | Rating |
|---|---|
| The Music Network | 3/5 stars |
| Rolling Stone | 1.5/5 stars |

Upon its release, "Good Time" received mixed to negative reviews from music critics. Natasha Shankar of She Knows gave the music video, though not the song, a positive review, saying "So from a dance standpoint it's not half bad. But Hilton has some talent. She's not a Heidi Montag, folks. But I've been kind enough to include the music video, and not the single alone. Why? Because, at the very least, you get to watch Hilton's glorious figure and perfect pout for the next five minutes".

Mikael Wood of Los Angeles Times gave a negative review, saying "Yet with its succession of sonic and lyrical cliches -- "haters," "sexy girls," laser-light synth squiggles—the song never summons anything approaching a recreational vibe; it's purely an exercise in brand maintenance, a working holiday that even Lil Wayne can't lighten with an amazingly perfunctory guest verse in which he admits, I can't tell you what's what". Sam Lansky of Idolator gave a very positive review, saying "The Afrojack-produced track hits solid marks with chilly synths that evoke Gina G's 1996 hit "Ooh Aah… Just A Little Bit" and lyrics that feel quintessentially Paris". Marc Hogan of Spin gave a negative review calling it "unapologetically dumb".

Mike Powell of Rolling Stone gave the song 1.5 out of 5 stars, saying "No needless disrespect to Hilton, who has put out listenable and even enjoyable music in the past, but rave-by-numbers tracks like this are often the reason pop music gets a bad rap to begin with. Worst off, sadly, is Wayne, a rapper who once had everything to lose". Nathan Jolly of The Music Network gave the song 3 out of 5 stars, saying "Truthfully if this single was released by any other artist, it would be a hit, but Hilton has proven so polarising that nothing short of an Adele-style smash will really suffice, and as you listen you can't help but sense those in the wings with their claws out, waiting to pounce".

== Music video ==
The music video for "Good Time" was recorded in a mansion in the Hollywood Hills and was directed by Hannah Lux Davis. It was released on October 8, 2013. and visual effects were created by GloriaFX. The music video finds Hilton beguiling a party and cooing suggestively over a juiced-up dance beat. In the clip, Hilton rolls around poolside, fist-pumps some glowsticks, and poses luxuriously, while Lil Wayne raps lines like, "I walked up to a big butt/And asked her ass, 'But what?'" Hilton wears a swimsuit studded with Swarovski crystals. The video premiered on RollingStone.com on October 7, 2013.

== Charts ==
=== Weekly charts ===
| Chart (2013) | Peak position |
|---|---|
| US Hot Dance/Electronic Songs (Billboard) | 18 |
