= Zella Day discography =

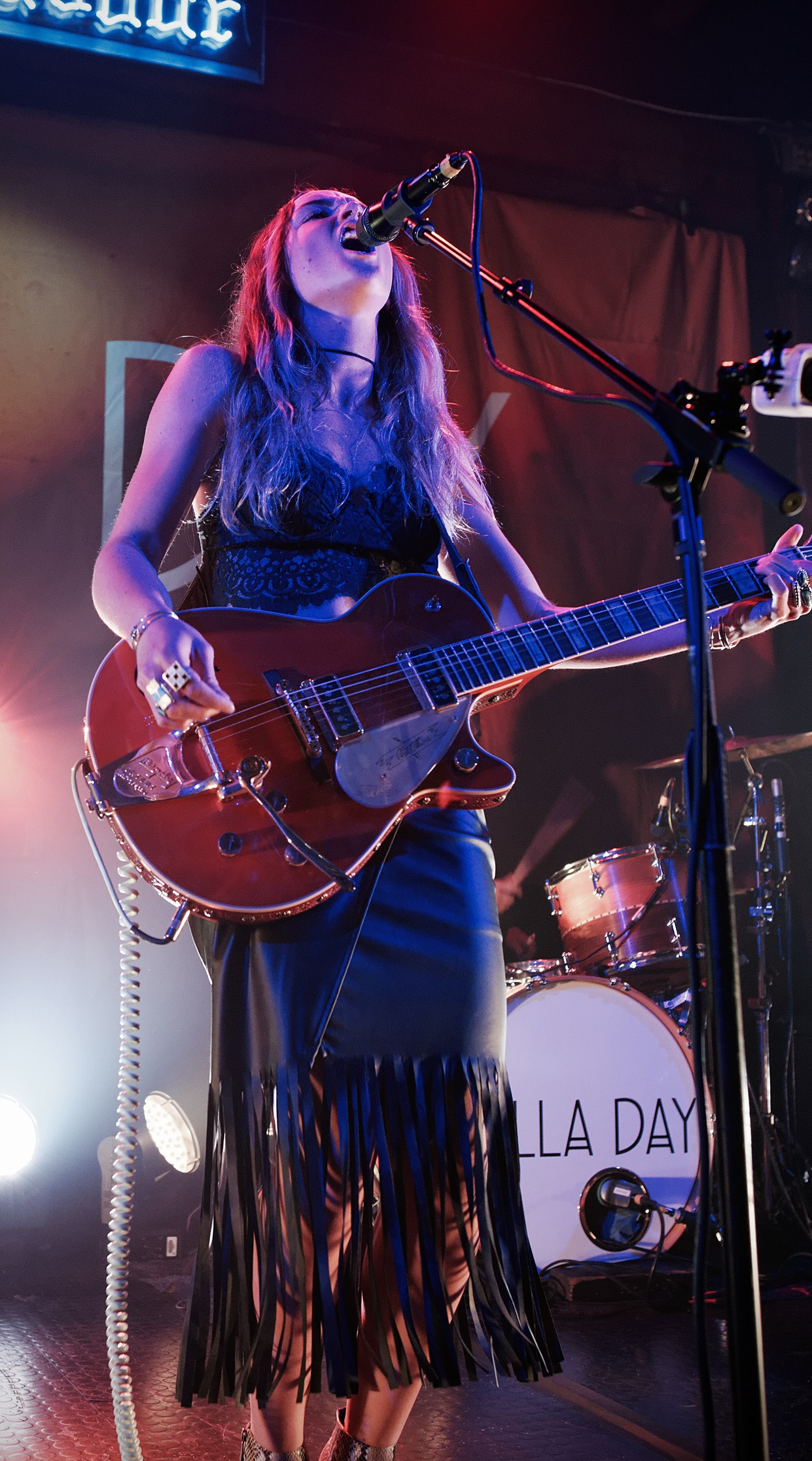
- Day performing in 2015
- Studio albums: 3
- EPs: 4
- Singles: 22
- Music videos: 7

American singer and songwriter Zella Day has released three studio albums, four extended plays, twenty-two singles, and seven music videos.

== Studio albums ==
List of studio albums, with selected chart positions, sales, and certifications
Title	Album details	Peak chart positions			
Title	Album details	US	US Digital	US Alt.	US Sales
Powered by Love	Released: February 8, 2009; Label: Zella Day Music; Format: CD, digital download	—	—	—	—
Kicker	Released: June 29, 2015; Label: Pinetop, Hollywood; Format: CD, LP, digital download, streaming	65	23	7	41
Sunday in Heaven	Released: October 14, 2022; Label: Concord; Format: CD, LP, digital download, streaming	—	—	—	—

== Extended plays ==
List of extended plays, with selected chart positions
Title	EP details	Peak chart positions
Title	EP details	US Heat
Cynics vs Dreamers	Released: May 22, 2012; Label: Self-released, Wax Ltd.; Format: Digital download	—
Zella Day	Released: October 21, 2014; Label: Pinetop, B3SCI; Format: LP, digital download	16
Digster Live Session	Released: May 26, 2015; Label: Pinetop, Hollywood; Format: Digital download	—
Where Does the Devil Hide	Released: August 28, 2020; Label: Concord, Easy Eye Sound; Format: Digital download, streaming	—

== Singles ==
=== As lead artist ===
Song	Year	Peak chart positions			Certifications	Album
Song	Year	US AAA	US Adult	UK Sales	Certifications	Album
"Seven Nation Army"	2012	—	—	27		Zella Day
"No Sleep to Dream"	2013	—	—	—		Cynics vs Dreamers
"Sweet Ophelia"	2014	—	—	—		Zella Day and Kicker
"East of Eden"	2015	—	—	—		Zella Day and Kicker
"Hypnotic"	2015	25	28	—	RIAA: Gold	Zella Day and Kicker
"High"	2015	—	—	—		Kicker
"Mustang Kids" (featuring Baby E)	2016	—	—	—		Kicker
"Man on the Moon" / "Hunnie Pie"	2016	—	—	—		Non-album single
"People Are Strangers"	2020	—	—	—		Where Does the Devil Hide
"My Game"	2020	—	—	—		Where Does the Devil Hide
"Purple Haze"	2020	—	—	—		Where Does the Devil Hide
"Only a Dream"	2020	—	—	—		Where Does the Devil Hide
"Benny My Dear"	2020	—	—	—		Where Does the Devil Hide
"Crazy Train"	2020	—	—	—		Non-album singles
"Holocene" (featuring Weyes Blood)	2021	—	—	—		Non-album singles
"Dance for Love"	2021	—	—	—		Sunday in Heaven
"Girls"	2021	—	—	—		Sunday in Heaven
"Golden"	2021	—	—	—		Sunday in Heaven
"Radio Silence"	2022	—	—	—		Sunday in Heaven
"Mushroom Punch"	2022	—	—	—		Sunday in Heaven
"Hand As My Arrow" (featuring Broods)	2023	—	—	—		Non-album singles
"Feather Boa"	2026	—	—	—		Non-album singles
"—" denotes a recording that did not chart or was not released in that territory.

=== As featured artist ===
Song	Year	Album
"All These Roads" (Sultan & Ned Shepard featuring Zella Day and Sam Martin)	2013	Non-album single
"Make a Change" (Nahko and Medicine for the People featuring Zella Day)	2016	Hoka
"Blood on the Mattress" (Korey Dane featuring Zella Day)	2017	Non-album singles
"What You Say" (Cold War Kids featuring Zella Day)	2022	Non-album singles
"Spiderwebs" (Okey Dokey featuring Zella Day)	2023	Complicated Handshake

=== Promotional singles ===
Year	Song	Album
2012	"I Lost Track of Time"	Non-album singles
2019	"You Sexy Thing"	Non-album singles

== Other releases ==
=== Guest appearances ===
Year	Song	Other artist(s)	Album	Credit
2014	"Electric Love"	BØRNS	Non-album song	Featured artist
2016	"Have Yourself a Merry Little Christmas"	None	Acoustic Christmas	Lead artist
2016	"Bloodline"	None	Diablo	Lead artist
2016	"Make a Change"	Nahko and Medicine for the People	Hoka	Lead artist
2017	"Wonderwall"	None	When We Rise	Lead artist
2019	"Castles"	Freya Ridings	Freya Ridings	Uncredited background vocalist
2021	"For Free"	Lana Del Rey, Weyes Blood	Chemtrails over the Country Club	Featured artist
2025	"You're Gonna Miss Me"	None	Texas Wild (Deluxe Edition)	Lead artist

=== Special releases ===
Year	Song	Notes
2018	"I Don't Know How to End"	Special release to Day's website

== Music videos ==
List of music videos, showing year released
Year	Title	Director(s)	Ref.
2012	"Seven Nation Army"	Mareesa Stertz	
2013	"All These Roads" (Sultan & Ned Shepard featuring Zella Day and Sam Martin)	Unknown	
2013	"No Sleep to Dream"	Gianennio Salucci	
2014	"Sweet Ophelia"	Gianennio Salucci	
2014	"Electric Love" (BØRNS featuring Zella Day)	Titanic Sinclair	
2015	"Hypnotic"	Gianennio Salucci	
2015	"Jameson"	Dana Morris	
2016	"Mustang Kids"	Tim Mattia	
2016	"High" (unreleased)	Unknown	
2019	"You Sexy Thing"	Phillip Lopez	
2020	"People Are Strangers"	Neil Krug	
2020	"My Game"	Phillip Lopez	
2020	"Purple Haze"	Neil Krug	
2020	"Only a Dream"	Samuel Richard; Gianennio Salucci	
