= East of Eden (Zella Day song) =

Single by Zella Day

from the EP Zella Day and the album Kicker
- Released: June 27, 2014
- Recorded: October 2013
- Studio: Wax Ltd Studios (Los Angeles, California)
- Genre: Electropop
- Length: 3:10
- Label: B3SCI; Pinetop
- Songwriters: Zella Day; Bonnie Baker; Xandy Barry
- Producer: Wax Ltd

Zella Day singles chronology
| "Sweet Ophelia" (2014) | "East of Eden" (2014) | "Compass" (2014) |

"East of Eden" a song by American singer-songwriter Zella Day, for her second extended play, Zella Day (2014), and her second studio album, Kicker (2015). It was released on June 27, 2014, through B3SCI and Pinetop Records, and was the second single to her eponymous EP. Produced by Wally Gagel and Xandy Barry from Wax Ltd, the song was written by Day, Bonnie Baker, Barry, and Gagel.

== Background and composition ==
Before the release of "East of Eden", in 2013, Day transitioned from living in Pinetop, Arizona to Los Angeles, California, which alludes to the song's themes about love and escape. In October 2013, whilst penning and recording "Sweet Ophelia", Day initiated work on "East of Eden". Day stated the song "started with a beat and put some chords down on the piano, and that’s how that song was born."

"East of Eden" is an "electro-pop", "pop-dubstep anthem" song with "a subtle ebb and flow", and has a "bright, simmering, and upbeat" element, with her voice having an "energetic presence" throughout the song. Its lyrics allude to John Steinbeck's novel of the same name, as well as the Book of Genesis. The song is about her struggle with escape. The song serves as a representation of Day's transition from leaving her hometown of Pinetop and into Los Angeles.

== Release and remixes ==
"East of Eden" served as the second single to her eponymous EP, Zella Day. KCRW premiered the single in promotion two days before its official release. Shortly after, on June 27, 2014, the song was officially released. However, the song did not debut onto major streaming platforms until mid-July. A month later, on August 1, 2014 — a remix featuring production by LA based electro-pop duo, Carousel, entitled, "Carousel Remix" was released digitally. Day announced the remix's release on social media. The song’s cover art features a kaleidoscope of greens, yellows, and oranges combine in a visual behind the song's title and respective artist.

== Critical reception ==
HillyDilly's Chris Danks praises the song. "The intro kicks things off with a pent-up energy the telegraphs the impending chorus, and when it finally does come to fruition, it becomes clear that Zella Day knows exactly what it takes to keep the music junkies hooked." Buzzbands's Seraphina Lotkhamnga commented, "the new track is a fresh juxtaposition of pummeling electronic beats and sweet soaring vocals." Earmilk's Caila Mills comments on her voice. "Zella’s voice has an energetic presence to it that perfectly fits in with the style of the tracks she been producing." In addition, she also says, "The laid back careless aura of her music is catchy and addictive." Turntable Kitchen's Matthew Hickey states, "It's her best yet."

== Personnel ==
Credits adapted from AllMusic and the liner notes of Kicker.

Performance credits

- Zella Day – vocals

Instruments

- Xandy Barry – keyboard, bass, guitar, piano
- Ryan Ogren – keyboard, bass, guitar
- Alexander Castillo – programmer
- Kiel Fisher – drums, percussion

Production

- Wax Ltd. – production
  - Xandy Barry – producer, mixer, recording engineer
  - Wally Gagel – producer, mixer, recording engineer
- Brian Blake – recording assistant
- Seth Olansky – recording assistant
- Howie Weinburg – mastering engineer
- Gentry Studer – mastering engineer
- Blueprint – engineer
