= Ghost Brigade (song) =

Single by Creeper
- Released: 4 November 2022
- Genre: Punk rock; gothic punk
- Length: 3:44
- Label: Spinefarm
- Songwriters: Will Gould; Ian Miles; Neil Kennedy; Tom Dalgety
- Producer: Tom Dalgety

Creeper singles chronology
"America at Night" (2021)	"Ghost Brigade" (2022)	"Cry to Heaven" (2023)

"Ghost Brigade" is a song by English rock band Creeper. Written by the band's lead vocalist Will Gould, guitarist Ian Miles, frequent collaborator Neil Kennedy, and producer Tom Dalgety, it was released on 4 November 2022 as a standalone single. The song was announced and published on streaming services at the end of the band's show When the Sun Comes at the Roundhouse in London, which marked the conclusion of the band's Sex, Death & the Infinite Void promotional cycle. "Ghost Brigade" is Creeper's first release on Spinefarm Records, with whom they signed in 2022, as well as the first to feature drummer Jake Fogarty, who joined in 2021.

== Background ==
Creeper played the last show of the promotional cycle for Sex, Death & the Infinite Void and American Noir at the Roundhouse in London on 4 November 2022. At the end of the show, a theatrical "decapitation" of the band's frontman Will Gould was staged, after which their signing with Spinefarm Records and the release of "Ghost Brigade" were announced. The single was the band's first to be produced by Tom Dalgety, who had previously worked with groups including Ghost, Royal Blood and the Damned. "Ghost Brigade" was performed live for the first time by the band at Wembley Arena on 26 May 2023, as part of a three-song set at the Heavy Music Awards, where it had also been nominated for Best Single.

== Reception ==
NME reporter Ellie Robinson hailed "Ghost Brigade" as "energised" and "biting", comparing it to "The Black Parade-era My Chemical Romance" and praising the track's "boisterous and crunchy guitars, soaring vocal melodies and a theatrical, xylophone-accented bridge". Writing for Rock Sound online, Jack Rogers claimed that the song "feels like it harks back to the very beginning of the band" as "a fantastical and furious piece of punk-rock fury". Describing the track as "fan-fucking-tastic", he also highlighted its "Circle-pit inciting pace, gorgeous drama that turns your blood to ice and the sort of old-school melodies that are made to be screamed at the top of your lungs". Ashley Perez Hollingsworth of Genre Is Dead also likened "Ghost Brigade" to Creeper's older material, claiming that it "feels like the band returning to their punk rock roots". Clash writer Robin Murray dubbed the song "a cathartic slice of gothic punk that taps into the lingering threat of Halloween".

== Personnel ==
- Will Gould – lead vocals
- Ian Miles – guitar
- Sean Scott – bass
- Hannah Greenwood – piano, backing vocals
- Jake Fogarty – drums
- Tom Dalgety – production, engineering, mixing
- Joe Jones – engineering
