= America at Night =

Single by Creeper

from the album American Noir
- Released: 9 July 2021
- Genre: Rock
- Length: 3:25
- Label: Roadrunner
- Songwriters: Will Gould; Xandy Barry
- Producer: Xandy Barry

Creeper singles chronology
"Midnight" (2021)	"America at Night" (2021)	"Ghost Brigade" (2022)

"America at Night" is a song by English rock band Creeper. Written by lead vocalist Will Gould with producer Xandy Barry of Wax Ltd, it is featured on the group's 2021 sixth EP American Noir. The track was released as the second single from the EP on 9 July 2021. Originally intended to serve as the opening track on 2020's Sex, Death & the Infinite Void, "America at Night" features co-lead vocals by keyboardist Hannah Greenwood, and drums by session contributor Kiel Feher.

== Background ==
Written by Will Gould and Xandy Barry, "America at Night" was inspired by the singer's experience of moving to Los Angeles for the production of Sex, Death & the Infinite Void, and was originally intended to serve as the 2020 album's opening track. Speaking as part of a track-by-track guide, Gould explained that "It's a song about being a stranger in a new place – for me, that was my experience of living in America [...] But in our story, it tells sort of a different tale of somebody arriving in a strange place, feeling alienated themselves, and learning what it is to be amongst those people." The track's composition was based on "Five Years" by David Bowie. Narratively, the song "finds our character Annabelle in mourning after the death of forbidden lover, Roe".

"America at Night" was released as the second single from American Noir on 9 July 2021. The song follows predecessor "Midnight" in featuring shared lead vocals by Gould and keyboardist Hannah Greenwood. Gould described the track as "one of the most dramatic pieces we've ever created", while Stereobard.com writer Laura Johnson described it as a "dramatic piano-led rock ballad". Alongside Gould, Greenwood and guitarist Ian Miles, the recording features producer Barry on bass, additional guitar and keyboards, and session performer Kiel Feher on drums.

== Reception ==
Kerrang! writer Emily Carter described "America at Night" as "another knockout single", calling it "beautifully theatrical". Jack Rogers of Rock Sound claimed that the track is "up there with [Creeper's] most rousing and dramatic releases to date," writing that it "swells with decadent keys and despondent strings" and features "some of the most pained and powerful vocal performances you'll hear this year". Reviewing the EP for DIY magazine, Ben Tipple claimed that the song "conjures the very darkness on which American Noir is built", typified by the chorus's opening line, "Here comes the dark". Marie Oleinik for The Line of Best Fit described "America at Night" as "the EP's centrepiece", writing that it features "guitar crescendos [which] build a gorgeous cinematic effect".

== Personnel ==
Creeper

- Will Gould – lead vocals
- Ian Miles – guitar
- Hannah Greenwood – keyboards, piano, vocals

Additional personnel

- Kiel Feher – drums
- Xandy Barry – production, engineering, mixing, guitar, bass, keyboards, programming
- Reda Haddioui – engineering, mixing assistance
- Richard Woodcraft – engineering
