= Zella Day (EP) =

2014 EP by Zella Day

- Standard cover

EP by Zella Day
- Released: October 21, 2014
- Recorded: October 2013 – 2014
- Studio: Wax Ltd Studios (Los Angeles); Blueprint Studios (Los Angeles); RPD Studios (Los Angeles)
- Genre: Pop; electropop
- Length: 12:30
- Label: B3SCI; Pinetop
- Producer: Wax Ltd; Blueprint

Zella Day chronology
Cynics vs. Dreamers (2012)	Zella Day (2014)	Kicker (2015)

Alternative cover
- Limited edition 10" vinyl cover

Singles from Zella Day
- 1. "Sweet Ophelia" Released: April 7, 2014; 2. "East of Eden" Released: June 27, 2014; 3. "Compass" Released: August 14, 2014

Zella Day is the second extended play by American singer-songwriter Zella Day. It was released on October 21, 2014, through B3SCI Records and Pinetop Records. Production was mostly handled by Wally Gagel and Xandy Barry of Wax Ltd, and features production from Blueprint.

The lead single, “Sweet Ophelia”, with “1965” as its B-side, was released on April 7, 2014. “Hypnotic”, an EP track, peaked at number 25 on the US Adult Alternative Airplay, alongside peaking at number 28 on the US Adult Top 40. The EP peaked at number 16 on the US Heatseekers Albums.

== Background and development ==
In 2011, Day secured a production agreement with Wax Ltd. They collaborated to produce her debut EP, Cynics vs. Dreamers. It was self-released digitally on May 23, 2012. In early 2012, Day secured a joint record agreement with B3SCI Records and Pinetop Records. On June 14, 2012, Day released her cover of The White Stripes' "Seven Nation Army". In October 2013, "Sweet Ophelia" and "East of Eden" were written. In a May 2014 interview with AMBY, Day announced that there was an EP "in the works", and that she was "in the studio every day... tightening up the mixes and they are so close to ready." She gave a release date of summer 2014. Two months later, in an interview with Turntable Kitchen and Earmilk, Day initially announced the EP would be released in August, and also stated that she was “working on a full-length album, which I’m planning on having out next year." The development would eventually be released as her major-label debut. The EP was delayed, and on September 12, 2014, she officially announced the release date and cover art on social media.

== Composition ==
Zella Day consists of four tracks, and is described as a pop and electropop record. Songs on the EP were written by Day herself, Bonnie Baker, Julia Michaels, Nick Bailey, Ryan Ogren, and Wax Ltd.

The pop song, "Hypnotic", commences Zella Day. The song discusses "the loss of power through physicality in a new relationship." The song was inspired by her life experiences after she moved to Los Angeles. The song is characterized as a "surreal spine-chiller", "potent", "breathy", with "tantalizing vocals", supported by an "offbeat rhythm". "Sweet Ophelia" is a synth-pop song that describes the experience of a person with whom she lost her virginity, who had already moved on to someone else. The song features a "colossal drum machine beat", "stomping percussion and smoky coos", and melancholic vocals. "Compass" is a powerful ballad, with light, springy keys and subtle percussion. Day describes it as “an ode to her love for her home-state Arizona.” Zella Day concludes with the "electropop" and "pop-dubstep anthem", "East of Eden". Inspired by the John Steinbeck novel of the same name, the song features an "[upbeat] subtle ebb and flow".

== Promotion ==
The lead single, "Sweet Ophelia" was released digitally on April 7, 2014, alongside a 7" LP release with "1965" as a B-side. The song premiered on Noisey. A music video for "Sweet Ophelia" was released to support the single. KCRW premiered the second single, "East of Eden", two days before its official release. It was released on June 27, 2014. The third single, "Compass", was released on August 14, 2014, and premiered on The405. "Hypnotic" served as the lead single to her major-label debut, Kicker. Day debuted the EP live at CMJ on October 23 & 25, 2014.

== Packaging and artwork ==
The standard cover features Day standing in front of a forest during spring with a teal-colored sky, while wearing a mustard yellow dress with vibrant yellow patterns. In addition to digital release, the record was released on compact disc. The standard CD is presented in a jewel case, with a mustard yellow CD inside. The CD is accompanied with a page of personnel that have contributed to the EP. Alongside compact disc, an exclusive, limited edition 10" LP, with a decorative swirl press was released. The LP is presented in a gatefold, and includes a lyric sheet of all four tracks. The release featured an alternative cover of Day standing while wearing a pink Panama hat, pink leather jacket, and pink leggings in front of an oval mustard yellow background with pink flowers surrounding it, alongside a different track listing order. It also featured a high-quality download code to listen to the record digitally. Only 200 copies were produced.

== Critical reception ==
Professional ratings
Review scores
Source	Rating
Sputnikmusic	4/5

Sputnikmusic gave Zella Day 4 out of 5 stars, and expands their review by stating, "On Zella Day, hazy and dreamlike atmospheres intertwine with exploding pop-based melodies to form something that is absolutely mesmerizing." They also comment, "Each of the songs present on Zella Day prove something different about her style and potential as an artist." In addition, they state, "Zella Day is sprinkled with sweet little moments, and it’s exactly why anyone who listens to this EP in its entirety will fall in love with her immediately."

== Track listing ==
All tracks were produced by Wax Ltd, except where noted.

Zella Day – Standard edition
No.	Title	Writer(s)	Producer	Length
1.	"Hypnotic"	Zella Day; Nick Bailey; Xandy Barry; Ryan Ogren	Wax Ltd; Blueprint	2:59
2.	"Sweet Ophelia"	Day; Barry		3:10
3.	"Compass"	Day; Barry; Julia Michaels		3:16
4.	"East of Eden"	Day; Bonnie Baker; Barry		3:05
Total length:				12:30

Zella Day – 10" LP
No.	Title	Writer(s)	Length
2.	"East of Eden"	Day; Baker; Barry; Gagel	3:05
4.	"Sweet Ophelia"	Day; Barry; Gagel	3:10
Total length:			12:30

== Personnel ==
Credits adapted from the EP's liner notes.

Performance credits

- Zella Day – vocals

Instruments

- Zella Day – guitar (tracks 1, 4)
- Xandy Barry – keyboard (all tracks); guitar (tracks 1–2); horn arrangement (track 2); piano, string arrangement (track 3)
- Ryan Ogren – keyboard, guitar (track 1)
- Kiel Feher – drums, percussion (track 4)

Production

- Wax Ltd – production
  - Xandy Barry – mixer, recording engineer, programmer
  - Wally Gagel – mixer, recording engineer, programmer
- Brian Blake – recording assistant
- Howie Weinburg – mastering engineer
- Blueprint – production, engineer (track 1)
- Ryan Orgen – programmer (track 1)
- Ryan Perez-Daple – engineer (track 3)

== Charts ==
Chart performance for Zella Day
Chart (2014)	Peak position
US Heatseekers Albums (Billboard)	16

== Release history ==
Release history and formats for Zella Day
Region	Date	Label	Format	Ref.
Various	October 21, 2014	Pinetop	Digital download	
United States	October 21, 2014	B3SCI; Pinetop	Digital download; LP	
Canada	October 21, 2014	B3SCI; Pinetop; Universal Music	CD; Digital download	
