= Sunday in Heaven =

2022 album by Zella Day

Studio album by Zella Day
- Released: October 14, 2022
- Recorded: 2020–2022
- Studio: Neon Cross Studios (Nashville, Tennessee); Excello Sound (Los Angeles, California); Studio Fulton (Los Angeles)
- Length: 45:46
- Label: Concord
- Producer: Alex Casnoff; Jay Joyce; John Velasquez

Zella Day chronology
Where Does the Devil Hide (2020)	Sunday in Heaven (2022)

Singles from Sunday in Heaven
- 1. "Dance for Love" Released: May 21, 2021; 2. "Girls" Released: June 18, 2021; 3. "Golden" Released: July 28, 2021; 4. "Radio Silence" Released: June 24, 2022; 5. "Mushroom Punch" Released: August 26, 2022

Sunday in Heaven is the third studio album by American singer-songwriter Zella Day. It was released on October 14, 2022, through Concord Records. The album was mostly produced by Jay Joyce, with additional production from Alex Casnoff and John Velasquez. In addition, it is her first album following the departure from her former label, Hollywood Records. Sunday in Heaven was supported by five singles. The album's lead single, "Dance for Love", was released on May 21, 2021.

== Background and development ==
In June 2015, after the release of her major-label debut, Kicker, Day started penning songs for her now unreleased third studio album. She released the double single, "Man on the Moon / Hunnie Pie" on November 18, 2016, which was intended as the lead single for the album. On November 29, 2018, Day announced on social media that she parted ways with Wax Ltd, Pinetop Records, and Hollywood Records. She also hinted at new music coming. However, the album was scrapped and remains unreleased. In an interview with Atwood Magazine, Day revealed that she "had a different idea of where my style and musical journey was going to take me." She also added that she "felt that I wasn’t situated to actually accomplish what I wanted to accomplish creatively." "I Don't Know How to End", an album track, was reworked for Sunday in Heaven, although it was released to the public as a gift on her website in December 2018.

In 2019, Day secured a recording and publishing deal with Concord Records. In October, she released a cover of Hot Chocolate's "You Sexy Thing". Shortly after, she collaborated with Easy Eye Sound to produce and visualize her fourth EP, Where Does The Devil Hide. It was released on August 28, 2020. Writing and demo creation for the album started in 2018. She penned up to 70 songs for Sunday in Heaven that were ultimately cut to twelve tracks. Day started creating demos with John Velasquez in the summer of 2019. Pre-production and recording for the album commenced in 2020. The album was mixed and mastered in 2021, and was intended to release that year, but was postponed to 2022. Throughout that period, Day and Alex Casnoff co-wrote and produced "Radio Silence", and the title track was written and recorded.

== Composition ==
Sunday in Heaven was described as "glitter-laden", "angelic", and an "audio time capsule". Day's vocals on the record are described as "sultry", "velvety", "cherubic", captivating", and "powerful". Paste's Candace McDuffle expands on her vocals by stating, "The captivating nature of Day's sultry voice can convince listeners of anything." Consequence's Joe Eckstein also states that "Now—Day is ready to cement her status as one of the most powerful voices in the genre." Prelude Press's Dom Virgil states that Sunday in Heaven is, "a record for moving forward out of darkness into light; for creating your own beautiful, sparkling reality exactly as you are."

== Release and promotion ==
The cover art, track listing, and release date for Sunday in Heaven were announced on August 26, 2022, by Day, alongside the fifth single, "Mushroom Punch" being released with a music video directed by Sophie Muller. The cover art was photographed by Elizaveta Porodina, and features Day in a hot crimson, ripped, long-sleeved leotard, posed on an endless void of water, with a hot mixture of reds and oranges in the background, with the album's title and Day's initials in the upper right corner. A listening party was hosted on Twitter on October 28. After the physical release of the record, a vinyl pressing error occurred, which caused certain tracks to not appear on certain LPs. Repressed versions were produced and were sent to buyers.

=== Singles ===
"Dance for Love" was announced as the lead single for the album, and was released on May 21, 2021. A visualizer was accompanied for the release of the song. A month later, Day released the second single, "Girls", on June 18, 2021. On July 25, 2021, Day announced the release of her third single, "Golden". It was released three days later on July 28, 2021, and debuted with a music video produced by Titanic Sinclair. The fourth single, "Radio Silence", was released on June 24, 2022, the same day the U.S. Supreme Court overturned Roe v. Wade. The song touched on Day's complications with an ectopic pregnancy. A music video was premiered almost a month later, shot on iPhone, and directed by Alex Casnoff. The fifth single from the record, "Mushroom Punch" was released on August 26, 2022.

=== Tour ===
Prior to her tour announcement, Day marketed her album by performing at a variety of smaller venues across the US, and in appearing in interviews with independent music journalists. On April 12, 2023, Day officially announced the Hot Summer Dreams Tour, her second headlining concert tour to further support the album. The first leg of the tour started on June 14, 2023, in Atlanta, Georgia, and concluded on August 14, 2023, in Austin, Texas. Day's tour accompanied with Okey Dokey as an opening act.

== Critical reception ==
Professional ratings
Review scores
Source	Rating
AllMusic	4/5 stars

AllMusic gave the record four out of five stars, with reviewer Matt Collar expanding it by saying, "Singer Zella Day transforms into a glitter-laden, '70s-inspired pop diva on 2022's Sunday in Heaven." He also wrote, "It's an enticing swirl of influences, magically straddling several genres...with country, disco, and adult-contemporary in the late '70s." Consequence's Joe Eckstein praised Day for her "spirit of freedom and liberation through her songwriting and impassioned vocal range, supported by genre-bending production", and elaborates that "Sunday in Heaven is a personal tale; one where snapshot moments of Day's life can be felt, the attention to detail in her lyrics forming vivid imagery. No lyric is wasted, and each verse is treated like a brushstroke, painting memories for listeners." Clash states that the album is "an enriching return, her pop aspects are infused with a disparate sound palette, one that moves from 80s college rock to 90s production aspects, filtered through her own unique lens."

=== Accolades ===
Accolades for Sunday in Heaven
Publication	List	Ref.
AllMusic	Favorite Singer/Songwriter Albums	

== Track listing ==
Sunday in Heaven track listing
No.	Title	Writer(s)	Producer(s)	Length
1.	"Mushroom Punch"	Zella Day; Ido Zmishlany; Jay Joyce; Simon Wilcox	Jay Joyce	3:49
2.	"Am I Still Your Baby"	Day; Joyce; Wilcox	Joyce	3:49
3.	"Dance for Love"	Day; Joyce; John Velasquez; Ryan Hahn	Joyce	4:23
4.	"Girls"	Day; Joyce; John Paul White	Joyce	3:31
5.	"Golden"	Day; John Paul White	Joyce	3:22
6.	"I Don't Know How to End"	Day	Joyce	4:01
7.	"Radio Silence"	Day; Alex Casnoff	Casnoff	4:00
8.	"Bunny"	Day; Joyce	Joyce	3:41
9.	"Real Life"	Day; Joyce	Joyce	3:34
10.	"Almost Good"	Day; Malay	Joyce	4:12
11.	"Last Time"	Day; Joyce	Joyce	5:07
12.	"Sunday in Heaven"	Day; Wilcox	Velasquez	2:29
Total length:				45:46

== Personnel ==
Performance credits

- Zella Day – vocals

Creative

- Elizaveta Porodina – photographer
- Sace Lamonica – package design

Production

- Jay Joyce – producer (tracks 1–6, tracks 8–11), mixer
- Alex Casnoff – producer (track 7)
- John Velasquez – producer (track 12)
- Court Blankenship – production assistant
- Jason Hall – recording assistant, mixing
- Andrew Mendelson – engineering assistant
- Jaxon Hargrove – engineering assistant
- John Velasquez – engineer, mixer (track 12)
- Jorge Balbi – engineer (track 7)
- Adam Gunther – engineer (track 7)
- Andrew Mendelson – mastering
- Paul Blakemore – mastering (track 7)

== Release history ==
Release history and formats for Sunday in Heaven
Region	Date	Format	Label	Ref.
United States	October 14, 2022	CD; digital download; LP; streaming	Concord	
Various	October 14, 2022	Digital download; streaming	Concord	
