= Midnight (Creeper song) =

Single by Creeper

from the album American Noir
- Released: 28 May 2021
- Genre: Rock
- Length: 3:39
- Label: Roadrunner
- Songwriters: Will Gould; Ian Miles; Hannah Greenwood
- Producer: Xandy Barry

Creeper singles chronology
"Poisoned Heart" (2020)	"Midnight" (2021)	"America at Night" (2021)

"Midnight" is a song by English rock band Creeper. Written by lead vocalist Will Gould, guitarist Ian Miles, and keyboardist/vocalist Hannah Greenwood, it was produced by Wax Ltd's Xandy Barry for the group's sixth EP American Noir. The track was released as the lead single from the EP on 28 May 2021. Originally written during sessions for the 2020 album Sex, Death & the Infinite Void, the song was the first to be completed for American Noir, and features co-lead vocals by Greenwood.

== Background ==
"Midnight" was released alongside the announcement of the EP American Noir on 28 May 2021. The song features lead vocals shared by the band's frontman Will Gould and keyboardist Hannah Greenwood, which Gigwise writer Vicky Greer likens to the practice on "Four Years Ago" from Sex, Death & the Infinite Void. The single is the first release since the departure of the band's drummer Dan Bratton in 2020 and their rhythm guitarist Oliver Burdett in 2021. Gould stated during an Instagram Q&A that his vocals were recorded during the sessions for Sex, Death & the Infinite Void and the band added parts later. A music video for "Midnight", directed by Olli Appleyard, was released on 17 June 2021.

== Reception ==
Media response to "Midnight" was positive. Vicky Greer of Gigwise wrote that the song features "a piano intro to die for" and "massive choruses", describing it as "a theatrical showstopper that might just be one of [the band's] greatest songs". Cris Watkins from the website Punkinfocus described "Midnight" as "a fitting introduction to the EP as a whole", praising the vocal interplay between Gould and Greenwood, and suggesting that "The song is also brave enough to continue to up the stakes, rising from the introduction's cinematic piano and culminating with the fiery intensity that the band have become renowned for." Gig Goer's Zoe Waggitt also highlighted the track's shared lead vocals, writing that "the vocals of Will Gould and Hannah Greenwood go hand-in-hand; their voices work perfectly together to create an almost Queen-esque sound."

== Personnel ==
Creeper

- Will Gould – lead vocals
- Hannah Greenwood – co-lead vocals, keyboards, piano
- Ian Miles – guitar
- Sean Scott – bass

Additional personnel

- Randy Cooke – drums
- Xandy Barry – production, engineering, mixing, keyboards, programming
- Reda Haddioui – engineering, mixing assistance
- Richard Woodcraft – engineering
