= Sweet Ophelia =

Single by Zella Day

from the EP Zella Day and the album Kicker
- B-side: "1965"
- Released: April 7, 2014
- Recorded: October 2013
- Studio: Wax Ltd Studios (Los Angeles)
- Genre: Pop
- Length: 3:10
- Label: B3SCI; Pinetop
- Songwriters: Zella Day; Xandy Barry
- Producer: Wax Ltd

Zella Day singles chronology
"Seven Nation Army" (2012)	"Sweet Ophelia" (2014)	"East of Eden" (2014)

Music video
- "Sweet Ophelia" on YouTube

"Sweet Ophelia" is a song released by American singer-songwriter Zella Day for her second extended play, Zella Day (2014), and her second studio album, Kicker (2015). The song was produced by Wally Gagel and Xandy Barry of Wax Ltd, with lyrics written by Day, Gagel, and Barry. It was released on April 7, 2014, through B3SCI and Pinetop Records, and serves as the lead single to the former record. "Sweet Ophelia" is a pop song with synth-backed production, with lyrics about the protagonist losing their virginity.

== Background and composition ==
In October 2013, "Sweet Ophelia" was written, alongside "East of Eden". In an interview with Wonderland, Day discussed the experience of creating the song by saying, "Sweet Ophelia happened really fast. My producers and I were hanging in the studio when I started messing around with this simple riff and floaty verse melody." On lyrics, she stated, "The first verse seemed to just fall out of me, and then we followed where the song was headed sonically." The song was finalized in early 2014.

"Sweet Ophelia" is a pop song with synth-backed production. The song is characterized as "dreamy", and has a consistent "colossal drum machine beat, atop a contemporary throbbing", supported with "crunchy snares", and "melancholic vocals." Lyrically, the song is about the protagonist losing their virginity. The song alludes to Hamlet's Ophelia.

== Release and promotion ==
The song was released on April 7, 2014, and premiered on Noisey. It received positive reception, as Noisey Staff described it as "one of the most charming pop songs we've heard this year." A music video for the song was released on the same day. Alongside digital release, a limited edition 7" LP, featuring "1965", the B-side to the track, pressed on clear vinyl; was released. Only 500 copies were pressed. The cover art of the track is of a yellow flower, hovering above the Grand Canyon; an allusion to Day's Arizonan roots, in a horizontal kaleidoscopic view. The song was played live at VevoDISCVR in the Electric Room at The Dream Downtown. It was also performed live at the Toyota Sessions, hosted by Pandora in 2015. The song was featured in The Vampire Diaries.

== Critical reception ==
Idolator's Carl Williot praises the song by stating, "It's like some mystical California desert chant-turned-love ballad that never tries to pummel the listener or prove its epic might." Jon Putnam from The Line of Best Fit comments on the chorus by stating, "It's hard not to get swept up into her windstorm when she croons, “up, up away”, as the chorus seeps away."

== Track listings ==
Digital download
No.	Title	Writer(s)	Producer	Length
1.	"Sweet Ophelia"	Zella Day; Wally Gagel; Xandy Barry	Wax Ltd	3:10
Total length:				3:10

"Sweet Ophelia" / "1965" – 7" LP
No.	Title	Writer(s)	Producer	Length
1.	"Sweet Ophelia"	Zella Day; Wally Gagel; Xandy Barry	Wax Ltd	3:10
2.	"1965"	Day; Gustav Jonsson; Barry	Wax Ltd	3:41
Total length:				6:51

== Personnel ==
Performance credits

- Zella Day – vocals

Instruments

- Xandy Barry – keyboard, guitar, horn arrangement

Production

- Wax Ltd – production
  - Xandy Barry – mixer, recording engineer, programmer
  - Wally Gagel – mixer, recording engineer, programmer
- Brian Blake – recording assistant
- Howie Weinburg – mastering

== Release history ==
Chart performance for "Sweet Ophelia"
Region	Date	Song(s)	Format	Label	Ref.
Various	April 7, 2014	"Sweet Ophelia"	Digital download	B3SCI; Pinetop	
United States	April 7, 2014	"Sweet Ophelia" / "1965"	7" LP	B3SCI; Pinetop	
