= Where Does the Devil Hide =

EP by Zella Day
- Released: August 28, 2020
- Recorded: 2018–2019
- Studios: Easy Eye Sound (Nashville, Tennessee)
- Genres: Indie pop; soft rock; funk
- Length: 16:38
- Labels: Easy Eye Sound; Concord
- Directors: Neil Krug; Phillip Lopez; Saamuel Richard; Gianennio Salucci
- Producer: Dan Auerbach

Zella Day chronology
Digster Live Session (2015)	Where Does the Devil Hide (2020)	Sunday In Heaven (2022)

Singles from Where Does the Devil Hide
- 1. "People Are Strangers" Released: April 23, 2020; 2. "My Game" Released: May 29, 2020; 3. "Purple Haze" Released: July 10, 2020; 4. "Only a Dream" Released: July 31, 2020; 5. "Benny My Dear" Released: August 28, 2020

Where Does the Devil Hide is the fourth EP by American singer and songwriter Zella Day, released on August 28, 2020. Preceded by four singles including "My Game" and "Only a Dream", the visual EP was produced by Dan Auerbach of The Black Keys. The record marks Day's first release under joint record deal with Concord Records and Easy Eye Sound.

The music videos for the EP were directed by Neil Krug, Phillip Lopez, Saamuel Richard and Gianennio Salucci. Krug also shot cover artwork for each song on the EP.

== Background and development ==
After releasing her debut major label album, Kicker (2015), under Hollywood Records, Day eventually split ways with the label in 2017. She then released the double-single "Man on the Moon / Hunnie Pie" (2018) under B3SCI, with the intention for the song to be the lead single off her unreleased third studio album. While on tour, Day debuted several songs such as "Gypsy Girl". Day eventually parted ways with B3SCI and signed a new deal with Easy Eye Sound and Concord Records to begin recording new material.

In an interview, Day stated that after leaving her labels she had "moved into a new apartment with [her] sister in Beachwood... [and] allowed [herself] to not feel pressured to write when [she] was hurting on the inside," adding how "there was a lot of betrayal that I was feeling. I was presenting these songs that I was in love with and they were being rejected. It was just kind of this wakeup call that I had to act now."

=== Recording ===
During the summer of 2019, Day wrote several songs over a four-day period that would end up becoming her EP, Where Does the Devil Hide. Produced by The Black Keys' Dan Auerbach, the EP features five songs. On working with Day, Auerbach said "Working with Zella at Easy Eye came as a creative partnership in so many ways. She’s such a free thinker. These songs showcase her in a way that is honest and self-realized." The song "People Are Strangers" was debuted live by Day as part of her opening set for Lana Del Rey in Santa Barbara.

=== Visuals ===
American photographer Neil Krug had assisted Day with her visuals for the songs on the EP, while also directing two videos for the EP with "People Are Strangers" and "Purple Haze". Phillip Lopez directed the follow-up video for "My Game" and co-directed "Only A Dream" with Gianennio Salucci. "Benny My Dear" has been the only song to not have a video so far, though a lyric video was released.

== Promotion and release ==
Prior to the release of the first single off the EP, Day debuted her cover of "You Sexy Thing" and premiered an accompanying video for it in September 2019. After announcing the EP, Day released "People Are Strangers" as the first single in April. This was followed by the release of "My Game" in May and "Purple Haze" and "Only a Dream" in July.

Day had only been able to promote the album with one performance due to the restrictions put in place due to the COVID-19 pandemic. Day performed "People Are Strangers" and "My Game" independently, without a crowd, as a part of a 360° livestream series in partnership with MelodyVR.

In an interview promoting the EP with Schön! magazine, Day announced that she had a full-length album coming as a follow-up to the EP.

=== Singles ===
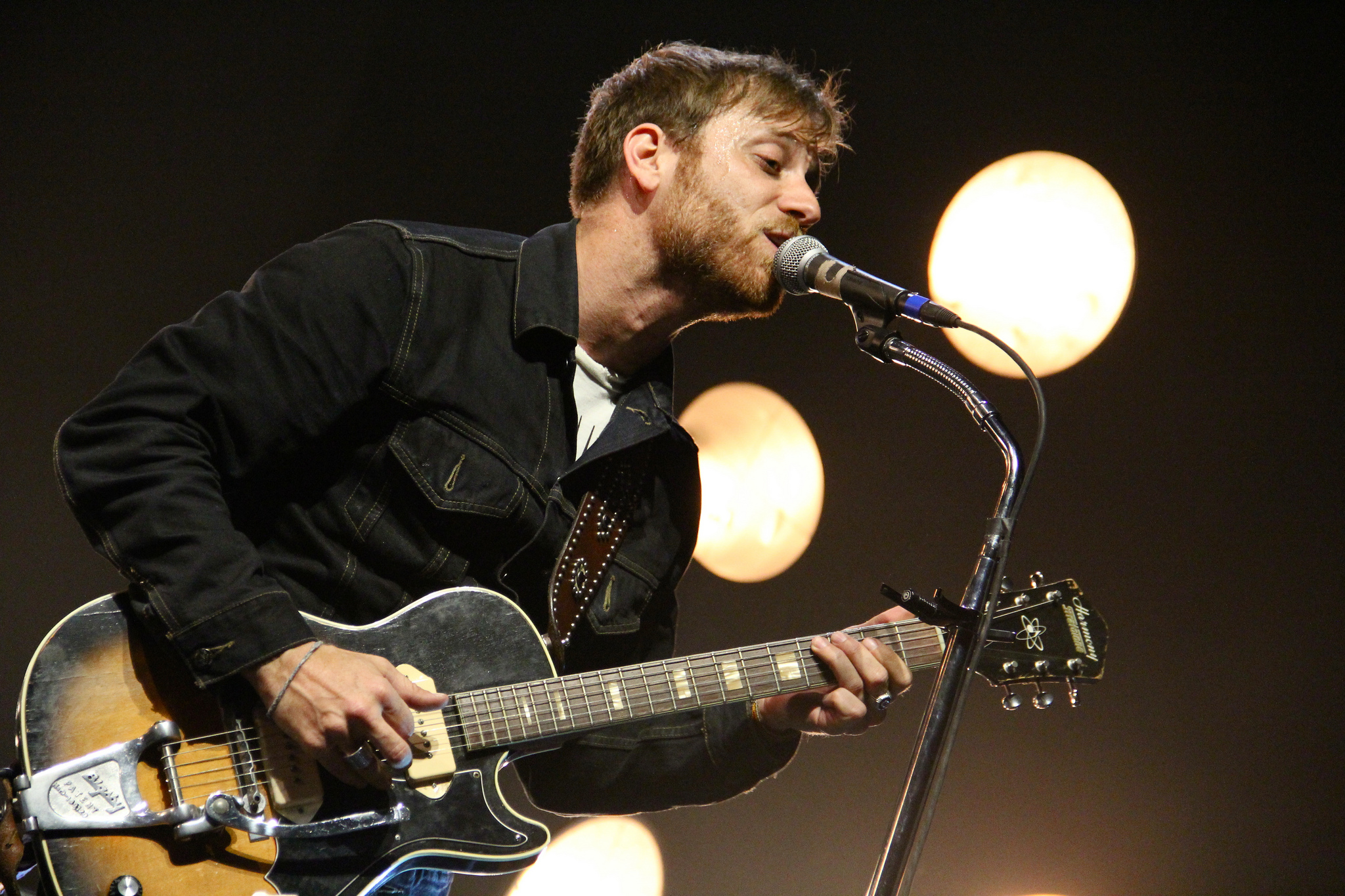
Dan Auerbach (pictured) produced and co-wrote the EP with Day.

"People Are Strangers", the EP's first single, was released on April 23, 2020. In a press release for the song, Day stated "I began writing "People are Strangers" on the bathroom floor after a night of learning an ugly truth about my lover. I brought the idea to Nashville where Dan Auerbach and I finished the song by taking a dark subject matter and approaching it with simplicity. There is sweetness to the lyrics and melodies of "People are Strangers" that is meant to inspire empathy towards the ones that have hurt us." Northern Transitions called the song a "vulnerable ballad, sun-soaked and possessing the aura of classic California" while Anna Milo Devine of Noise Trend praised the song as "a sonic nod to the sounds and ideas of "quintessential California", but refreshed with modern honesty." The song is dream pop, influenced by surf rock and soft rock.

The second single, "My Game", is a pop funk and nu-disco track. Written by Day, Auerbach, and Bobby Wood, the song is an upbeat anthem that serves as an homage to classic '70s film scores and Donna Summer. American Songwriter called the song "sexy psychedelic and cinematic romp that would have made for the perfect 007 theme song".

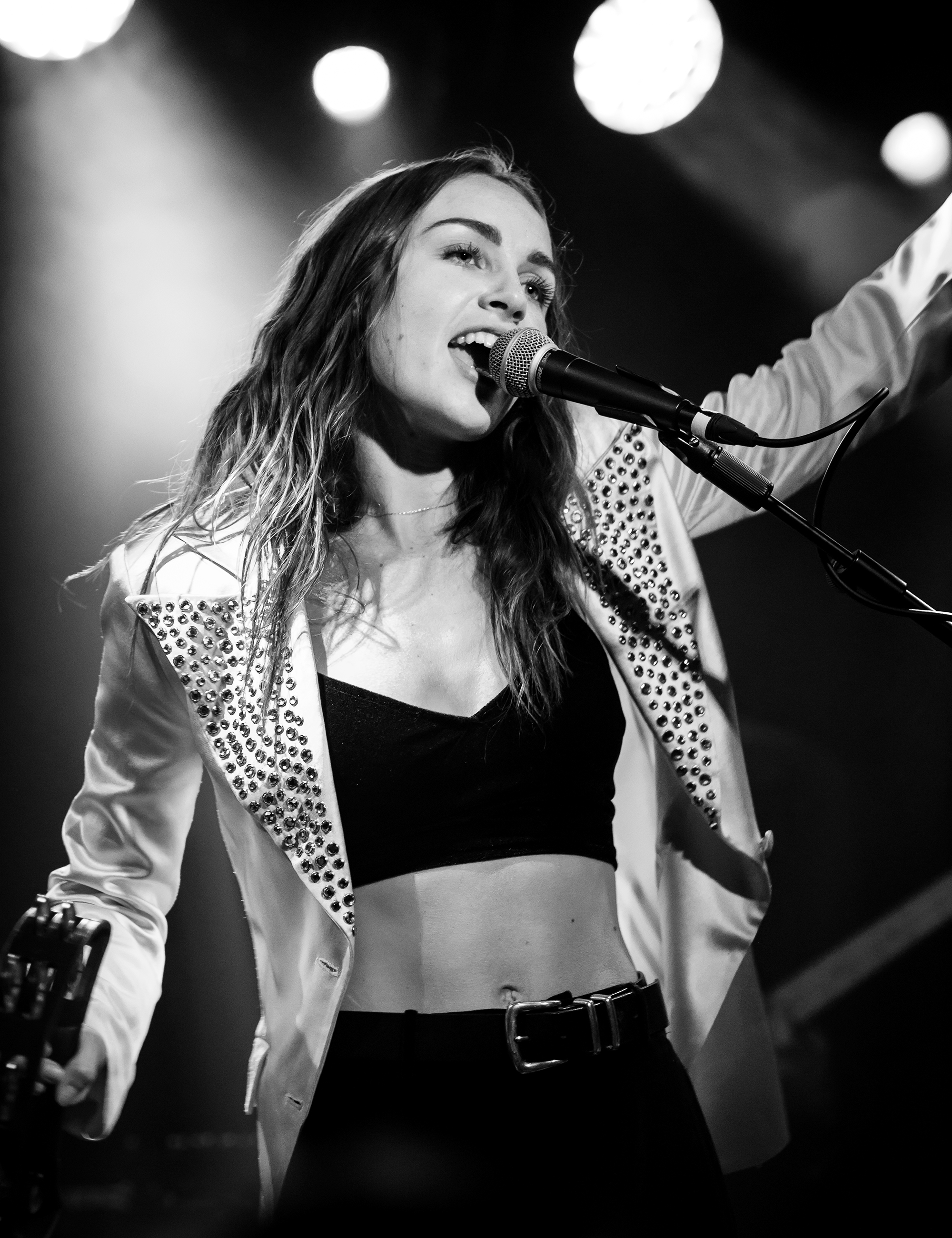
Day (pictured in 2017) co-wrote every song on the EP.

The third song off the EP, "Purple Haze", was announced and released on July 9 alongside an accompanying Neil Krug-directed music video. A writer from Skope magazine called the video "technicolor visions of Zella that warp and melt together like vivid hallucinations, the piece truly makes you feel as though you can taste outer space" and adding that the song itself is "sultry psychedelia and marks yet another imaginative sonic direction" like the other songs released from the EP at the time. Day commented on the song's conception and meaning, saying how "‘Purple Haze’ is summer love for simple pleasures. When I lived in downtown LA I would hum this melody while strolling to the market in the mood for something sweet. All of those perfect Saturdays with nothing to do but eat oranges and daydream."

The fourth song released, "Only a Dream", is an indie pop ballad about desiring a relationship even if it is toxic and all-consuming. The video was directed by Saamuel Richard and Gianennio Salucci and released online on July 31, 2020. The video follows Day and her male co-star in a vintage-themed, passionate love story. The clip was filmed in San Luis Obispo, partially at the Madonna Inn. When interviewed by Flaunt magazine, Day said the song was inspired by the garden of love and the visuals for the video were inspired by her mother's backyard in Day's childhood home in Arizona. The song's bridge references the title of the EP.

The final single, "Benny My Dear", was released on the EP's release date of August 28, 2020. The song's digital release was followed by a lyric video being premiered on Day's Vevo on the same day. Upon the release, Day released a statement stating how "selfless love acts without expectation of receiving anything other than the satisfaction of giving. Benny has been crying out for affection for far too long, he struggles to believe that he deserves it. Benny reminds us that vulnerability is the only way out and the only way in."

== Critical reception ==
Taila Lee of The Daily Californian left a positive review of the record, commenting how "A variety of genres are represented in Day’s vibrant discography, but this organic EP signifies her general shift from down-to-earth pop to head-in-the-clouds indie." Gary Graff of The Oakland Press included the EP in its weekly list of new musical releases. Taylor Thompson of Lady Gunn positively compared the EP to the music of Stevie Nicks and The Doors while calling the video for "Only A Dream" "beautifully intimate and personal".

== Track listing ==
All tracks were produced by Dan Auerbach.

Where Does the Devil Hide track listing
No.	Title	Writer(s)	Length
1.	"People Are Strangers"	Zella Day; Dan Auerbach	2:59
2.	"My Game"	Day; Auerbach; Bobby Wood	3:30
3.	"Purple Haze"	Day; Auerbach; Dan Nigro	3:19
4.	"Only a Dream"	Day; Auerbach; Nigro	3:31
5.	"Benny My Dear"	Day; Auerbach	3:19
Total length:			16:38

== Credits and personnel ==
Adapted from credits on Genius.

Musicians

- Zella Day – lead vocals (tracks 1–5), backing vocals (tracks 1, 5), songwriting (tracks 1–5)
- Dan Auerbach – acoustic guitar (tracks 1, 4, 5), electric guitar (tracks 1, 3–5), percussion (track 1), songwriting (tracks 1–5), mellotron (track 4), background vocals (tracks 3, 5)
- Bobby Wood – piano (tracks 1, 3–5), keyboards (tracks 1, 3, 5), songwriting (track 2), drums (track 3), background vocals (track 4)
- Ray Jacildo – vibraphone (track 1), glockenspiel (tracks 1, 4), keyboards (tracks 1, 4, 5), synthesizer (track 3), harpsichord (track 3)
- Sam Bacco – percussion (tracks 1, 5), drums (track 5)
- Gene Chrisman – percussion (track 3), drums (track 3–5)
- Dave Roe – bass guitar (tracks 1, 3–5)
- Dan Nigro – songwriting (track 3, 4)
- Matt Combs – strings (tracks 1, 4)
- Leisa Hans – background vocals (track 5)
- Ashley Wilcoxson – background vocals (track 5)

Technical

- Dan Auerbach – recording engineer (tracks 1, 3, 5), recording producer (tracks 1–5)
- M. Allen Parker – recording engineer (tracks 1, 3, 5), studio personnel (track 5)
