= Kicker (album) =

Album by Zella Day

Studio album by Zella Day
- Released: June 2, 2015
- Recorded: October 2013 – 2014
- Studio: Wax Ltd Studios (Los Angeles); Blueprint Studios (Los Angeles); Capitol Studios (Los Angeles); RPD Studios (Los Angeles)
- Genre: Pop; folk pop
- Length: 38:10
- Label: Pinetop; Hollywood
- Producer: Wax Ltd; Blueprint

Zella Day chronology
Zella Day (2014)	Kicker (2015)	Where Does the Devil Hide (2020)

Singles from Kicker
- 1. "Hypnotic" Released: February 27, 2015; 2. "High" Released: May 1, 2015; 3. "Mustang Kids" Released: May 23, 2016

Kicker is the second studio album and major-label debut by American singer-songwriter Zella Day. It was released on June 2, 2015, through Pinetop Records and Hollywood Records. Production was mostly handled by Wally Gagel and Xandy Barry of Wax Ltd, and features production from Blueprint. Guest vocals on the album were provided by Baby E.

Kicker debuted at number 65 on the US Billboard 200 and number 7 on the US Top Alternative Albums. Kicker was supported by three singles. The album's lead single, "Hypnotic", was released on February 27, 2015. It was later certified gold by the Recording Industry Association of America, and peaked at number 25 on the US Adult Alternative Airplay. The second single, "High", was released on May 1, 2015. The third single, "Mustang Kids", was serviced to alternative radio on May 23, 2016.

== Background and development ==
Prior to the release of Kicker, Day self-released her debut album, Powered By Love at age 13. At age 15, Day secured a management contract with Parallel Entertainment. She met with record executives in Los Angeles, California, who wanted her to have a television component. However, she had conflicting views. She was then forwarded to Nashville, Tennessee, and met American producer Dann Huff. Shortly after, she started penning songs at a BMG writing camp there for 1 1/2 years. In an interview with Idolator, Day stated that she had "really intensive writing days." Afterwards, "it came time to produce some of the tracks and it was too country." This created a conflict between Day and her management team. They were not able to reach a resolution, resulting in her being sent back to Los Angeles. She promptly met Wally Gagel and Xandy Barry of Wax Ltd. They aligned creatively, and Day secured a recording contract with them shortly after.

In 2012, Day secured a joint record and publishing agreement with B3SCI Records and Pinetop Records, an imprint of Hollywood Records. In October 2013, Day started production on her eponymous second EP. "Sweet Ophelia" and "East of Eden" were the first tracks written and recorded. In February 2014, "1965" was written. Later that year, "Compass" and "Hypnotic", were written and recorded. In a July 2014 interview with Turntable Kitchen, Day officially announced she was "working on a full-length album, which I’m planning on having out next year." Day released the EP on October 21, 2014. All tracks on the EP would be re-released on Kicker. The production period for Kicker was a year long. Throughout the period, Day created over 200 demos for the album. "Shadow Preachers" was recorded in late 2014. "Jerome" and "Jameson" were the last tracks written for the album. On February 27, 2015, Day announced the release date and title of the record. The track list was revealed on March 17, 2015. The album's title is a reference to an Apache man she met while growing up in Pinetop.

== Composition ==
=== Music and lyrics ===
Kicker is characterized as a pop and folk-pop record. The musical style is described as a contemporary American Midwestern record. The album features elements of "indie electronica" and "bluesy, symphonic balladry." In a May 2015 interview with SFWeekly, Day says, "There's two sides to the record...You get to hear two sides of me: the happy side and the tormented side."

=== Songs ===
Kicker commences with "Jerome". The track refers to the city of Jerome, Arizona, and mentions the mythical ghost of Zella. The song is described as "upbeat", "yearning" and "soulful". "High" is characterized as "dreamy", "smoldering" and "thrilling". Lyrically, the song discusses a "sad reality amongst lovers...when the need to seek outside substances becomes the source of fulfillment in the relationship." "Ace of Hearts" is described as "icy", "infectious", and "hooky". The "indie ode," "1965" lyrically discusses the year of the same name. Day describes it as "a year of change, beauty, and turmoil, as was my life when [she] wrote the song." "Jameson" is an acoustic ballad about a man who she loves, who struggles with alcoholism, though there's "a light at the end of the tunnel...It's kind of like love, but being in love with something you can't have because something [else] already has it." The song refers to the whiskey brand of the same name. Day conveys the message with "sentiment" and her "stripped-down" performance. "Shadow Preachers" discusses "all of the conflicting feelings that you experience when you’re in a relationship."

== Promotion ==
=== Singles and promotion ===
On February 27, 2015, the album's lead single, "Hypnotic", was released and was accompanied by a music video that premiered on Spin. It was the iTunes Single of the Week, and charted at number 25 on the US Adult Alternative Songs, alongside charting at number 28 on the US Adult Pop Songs. The song received critical acclaim. On May 1, 2015, the second single, "High", was released, and premiered on Billboard. The song peaked at number 36 on the US Billboard Emerging Twitter Artists. A music video was intended to be released to support the single, but was ultimately held back by her label. Throughout May, Day released fifteen-second snippets of album tracks on YouTube to promote the record. She released her debut live EP in support of the album, entitled Digster Live Session, a week before its official release. She debuted "High" live on national television on the late-night show, Conan, on June 10, 2015. A day later, Jameson, an album track, was given an art-concept video. On May 23, 2016, the third and final single, "Mustang Kids", featuring Florida-bred rapper Baby E was released to alternative radio. A music video directed by Tim Mattia was released on June 9, 2016. She also gave several interviews to newspapers and online magazines.

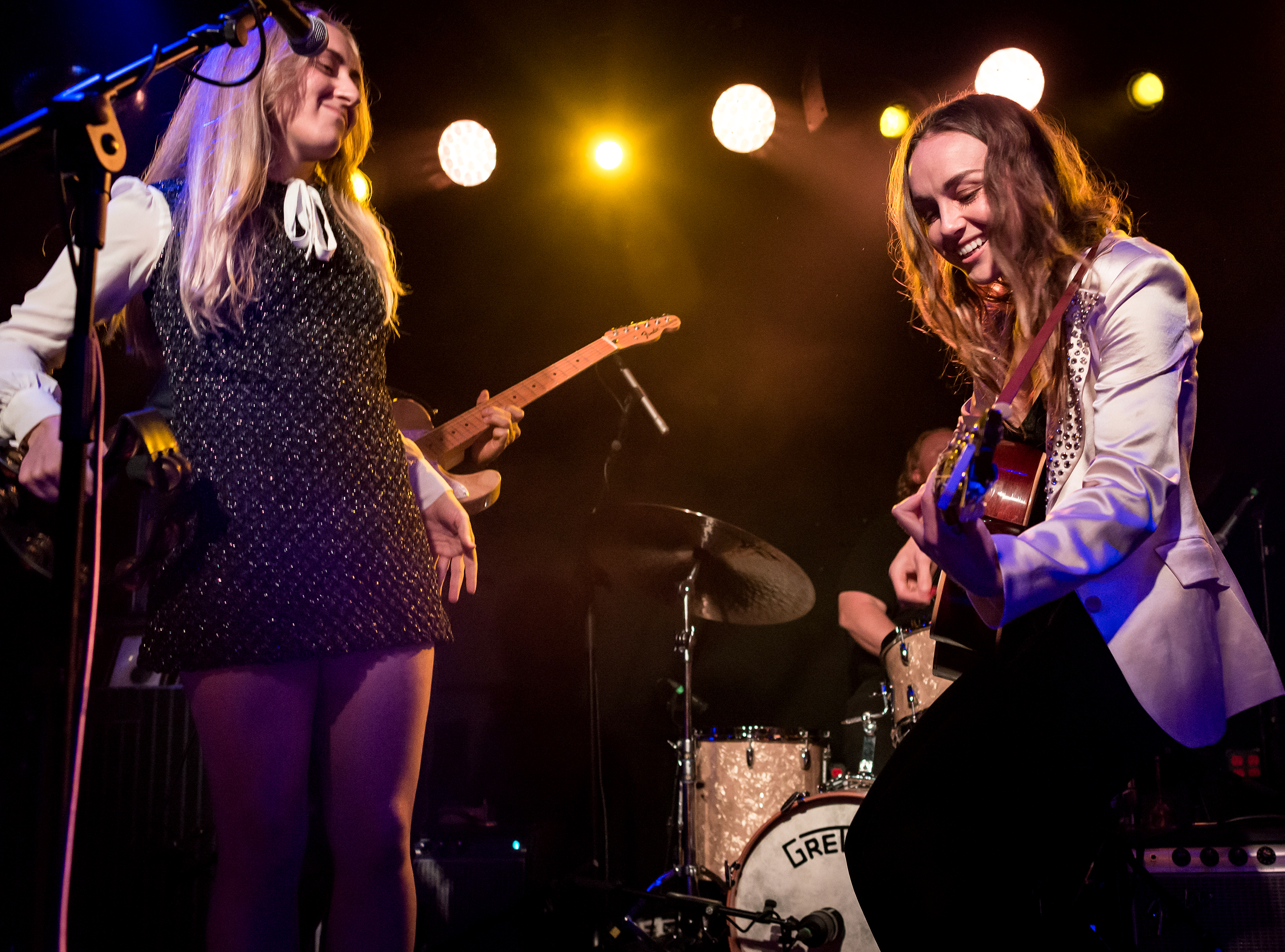
Day performing live at the Moroccan Lounge in downtown Los Angeles, California, on Tuesday, November 21, 2017.

=== Tour and performances ===
To promote Kicker, Day embarked on her debut headlining tour in support of the album. The tour began on June 21, 2016, in Kansas City, Missouri, and ended on October 7, 2016, in Tucson, Arizona. Day embarked on a supporting run with LA neo-soul group Fitz and the Tantrums throughout July, and as a supporting act with Michael Franti and Spearhead in August.

Day made appearances at a number of high-profile events, including the iHeartRadio Music Festival, Lollapalooza, and Coachella, which caught the attention of the Los Angeles magazine, and described the performance as "hypnotic". Consequence of Sound stated, "it's entirely possible that Zella Day looks back on Coachella 2016 as the moment that launched her career in the earnest...Day is an undeniably powerful vocalist."

== Critical reception ==
Professional ratings
Review scores
Source	Rating
AllMusic	3/5 stars
Sputnikmusic	3.5/5

AllMusic gave Kicker three out of five stars, with reviewer Matt Collar describing the album as "a rootsy and engaging showcase for her pop theatricality." He praises Day's "dusty coo of a voice." Sputnikmusic comments, "Day is a multi-faceted artist who can, with very little warning, turn the tide from joyful and whimsical to dark and desolate. It’s the kind of stuff that only the very best artists have in them." They dubbed the album as a "mixed bag". Jon Pareles of The New York Times stated that Day "sings about desire and self-destruction, about pleasure bound up with addiction, betrayal and surrender."

== Track listing ==
All tracks were produced by Wax Ltd, except where noted.

Kicker track listing
No.	Title	Writer(s)	Producer(s)	Length
1.	"Jerome"	Zella Day; Xandy Barry		3:32
2.	"High"	Day; Barry; Gagel; Erica Driscoll		3:38
3.	"Ace of Hearts"	Day; Barry; Gustav Jonsson		3:37
4.	"1965"	Day; Barry; Jonsson		3:38
5.	"East of Eden"	Day; Bonnie Baker; Barry; Gagel		3:06
6.	"Hypnotic"	Day; Nick Bailey; Barry; Ryan Ogren	Wax Ltd; Blueprint	2:56
7.	"Mustang Kids" (featuring Baby E)	Day; Barry; Gagel; Ethan Lowery; Alexander Vasquez		3:02
8.	"The Outlaw Josey Wales"	Day; Barry		3:08
9.	"Jameson"	Day		3:08
10.	"Shadow Preachers"	Day; Barry; Julia Michaels		2:37
11.	"Sweet Ophelia"	Day; Barry; Gagel		3:09
12.	"Compass"	Day; Barry; Michaels		3:13
Total length:				38:10

== Personnel ==
Performance credits

- Zella Day – vocals
- Ethan Lowery – vocals (track 7)

Creative

- Brock Lefferts – design
- Alexandra Valenti – photographer

Instruments

- Zella Day – guitar
- Wally Gagel – guitar, programming, bass, keyboards, kalimba, horn arrangement
- Xandy Barry – guitar, programming, bass, keyboards, piano, string arrangement
- Ryan Orgen – guitar, programming, bass, keyboards
- Kiel Feher – drums, percussion
- Alexander Vasquez – programming

Orchestra on tracks 3, 8 and 10

- Caroline Campbell – concertmaster
- Nina Evtuhov – violin
- Julie Gigante – violin
- Kevin Kumar – violin
- Songa Lee – violin
- Natalie Leggett – violin
- Phil Levy – violin
- Lisa Liu – violin
- Serena McKinney – violin
- Alyssa Park – violin
- Katia Popov – violin
- Mary Sloan – violin
- Robert Brophy – viola (1st)
- Alma Fernandez – viola
- Shawn Mann – viola
- David Walther – viola
- Steve Erdody – cello (1st)
- Eric Byers – cello
- Vanessa Freebairn-Smith – cello
- Tim Landover – cello
- Mike Valerio – bass (1st)
- Stephen Dress – bass
- Laura Brenes – horn
- Mark Adams – horn (1st)
- Teog Reaves – horn
- Alex Iles – trombone (1st)
- Steven Holtman – trombone
- Bill Reichenbach – trombone
- Wade Cullbreath – percussion
- Randy Kerber – piano

Production

- Wax Ltd – production
  - Wally Gagel – executive producer, mixer, recorder
  - Xandy Barry – executive producer, mixer, recorder
- Brian Blake – recording assistant
- Seth Olansky – recording assistant (tracks 1–3, 7–10)
- Howie Weinburg – mastering
- Gentry Studer – mastering
- Blueprint – production assistant (track 6); engineer (tracks 5, 6, 11)
- Ryan Perez-Daple – production assistant, engineer (track 12)
- Alan Meyerson – first orchestral engineer (tracks 3, 8, 10)
- Steve Genewick – second orchestral engineer (tracks 3, 8, 10)

== Charts ==
Chart performance for Kicker
Chart (2015)	Peak position
US Billboard 200	65
US Top Alternative Albums (Billboard)	7

== Release history ==
Release history and formats for Kicker
Region	Date	Format	Label	Ref.
United States	June 2, 2015	CD; digital download; LP	Pinetop; Hollywood	
Canada	June 2, 2015	CD; digital download	Pinetop; Hollywood	
Germany	June 26, 2015	CD; digital download	Universal Music	
Various	June 29, 2015	Digital download	Universal Music	

== Digster Live Session ==
Digster Live Session

EP by Zella Day
- Released: May 26, 2015
- Recorded: 2015
- Genre: Acoustic pop
- Label: Pinetop; Hollywood

Zella Day chronology
Kicker (2015)	Digster Live Session (2015)	Where Does the Devil Hide (2020)

Digster Live Session is the first live extended play by American singer-songwriter Zella Day. Released as a part of Digster's Live Session series, the EP was released onto digital outlets on May 26, 2015, several days before the release of Day's album, Kicker. Like its parent album, the EP was released under Hollywood Records and Day's imprint, Pinetop.

=== Track list ===
No.	Title	Length
1.	"East of Eden"	3:52
2.	"Hypnotic"	3:04
3.	"Jameson"	2:59
4.	"Sweet Ophelia"	3:43
