= American Noir =

EP by Creeper
- Released: 30 July 2021
- Recorded: 2019–2021
- Studio: Wax Ltd Studios (Hollywood, Los Angeles)
- Genre: Gothic rock
- Length: 19:10
- Label: Roadrunner
- Producer: Xandy Barry; Ian Miles

Creeper chronology
Sounds from the Void (2021)	American Noir (2021)	Sanguivore (2023)

Singles from American Noir
- 1. "Midnight" Released: 28 May 2021; 2. "America at Night" Released: 9 July 2021

American Noir is the sixth extended play (EP) by English rock band Creeper. Written and recorded with producer Xandy Barry during sessions for the group's second studio album Sex, Death & the Infinite Void, it was released on 30 July 2021 by Roadrunner Records. The EP is the band's first release since the departures of guitarist Oliver Burdett and drummer Dan Bratton, and the first since Bratton's replacement Jake Fogarty (although he is not featured as a performer).

Written by vocalist Will Gould, guitarist Ian Miles and keyboardist Hannah Greenwood with Barry, American Noir serves as an "epilogue" to the story told on Sex, Death & the Infinite Void, which ends with the death of protagonist Roe. The EP features five songs and three interludes, with lead or co-lead vocals on three tracks contributed by Greenwood, who plays the role of Roe's lover Annabelle. "Midnight" and "America at Night" were issued as singles prior to the EP's release.

American Noir received widely positive reviews from critics. Many commentators praised the EP for its theatrical, dramatic songwriting, which they claimed built strongly on the story of Sex, Death & the Infinite Void. Some reviews went as far as to dub the EP better than the album overall, while multiple writers praised the increased vocal contributions of Greenwood. American Noir debuted at number 13 on the UK Albums Chart and number 1 on the UK Rock & Metal Albums Chart.

== Writing and recording ==
The songs on American Noir were written and recorded during sessions for Creeper's 2020 second album Sex, Death & the Infinite Void. Speaking with Kerrang! magazine after the EP's announcement, the band's frontman Will Gould explained that "It's kind of made up of surplus music that we made for the last record. Some of the songs I was writing for that last one, I was super proud of, they were awesome, but they just didn't fit on the album." In an interview with Clash magazine, the vocalist added that the tracks eventually featured on the release were not written at the same time as one another, which he claimed made it feel "odd and difficult to lay them next to each other". In order to make the collection more cohesive, the intro "Midnight Militia", interlude "The Drowning Room" and outro "Frozen Night" were added later.

The title American Noir also originates from the Sex, Death & the Infinite Void sessions. According to Gould, producer Xandy Barry came up with the idea when the band were recording "Paradise", and the singer "loved it" as he "always had a fondness for American noir". Initially, the moniker was to be used for the 2020 album as it "fits the theme of the dark America that inspired the record", however Gould explained prior to its release that "It felt like it was too simple for people, so we decided to go for the more interesting one." The Creeper frontman concluded that "When we decided to start this record ... it made sense to bring that back out of the dark."

American Noir is Creeper's first recording since the departures of guitarist Oliver Burdett and drummer Dan Bratton. The EP's artwork features replacement drummer Jake Fogarty, although he joined after the recording, therefore drums are performed by session contributors Randy Cooke (on "Midnight", "Ghosts Over Calvary" and "One of Us") and Kiel Feher (on "America at Night"), with Bratton featured on "Damned and Doomed". An earlier mix of "Damned and Doomed" had previously been made available for those who pre-ordered Sex, Death & the Infinite Void.

== Promotion and release ==
American Noir was announced on 27 May 2021, when lead single "Midnight" was premiered on BBC Radio 1. The single was released on streaming services the next day. A music video directed by Olli Appleyard was released on 17 June, which depicts the death of Roe and was described by Gould as "lavish and tragic as the music itself". "Midnight" was followed by second single "America at Night" on 9 July. A second video from the album, for closing song "Damned and Doomed", was released on 2 August, which depicts Greenwood in the role as Annabelle "softly floating in and out of focus as she sings the despondent and devastating track," which was described by Rock Sound writer Jack Rogers as "a beautiful interpretation of the haziness and heaviness of grief". "Midnight" received its first live performance when the band headlined the Second Stage at the Download Festival pilot on 19 June 2021. "Ghosts Over Calvary" and "Damned and Doomed" were also added to live sets later in the year.

== Composition and lyrics ==
Critics have categorised American Noir as gothic rock, merging the genre with elements of glam rock, Britpop and art rock. DIY magazine writer Ben Tipple stated that it "blur[s] the lines between rock, pop and musical theatre."

The lyrical content on American Noir serves as an epilogue to Sex, Death & the Infinite Void, telling "the story of the days following the death of our protagonist Roe". In a feature for Clash magazine, Gould explained that "American Noir picks up from where our last record left off. [...] It's a copulative romance that takes this fatal turn at the last moment, and that's where this record leaves us." In a review of the EP for Gigwise, Vicky Greer described the EP as "a funeral for Roe", which she credits as the justification for keyboardist Hannah Greenwood performing lead vocals on four of the collection's five songs. Line of Best Fit writer Marie Oleinik describes the EP's focus further, writing that "Roe's death incites Annabelle's rage, sharply delivered by [Greenwood] in "Ghosts Over Calvary", then mournful defeat in "Damned and Doomed"."

In a track-by-track feature released on the band's YouTube channel, Gould recalled more about how writing and recording in the US helped inspire the tracks on American Noir. "America at Night" was originally intended to serve as the opener for Sex, Death & the Infinite Void, and was described by the singer as "a song about being a stranger in a new place – for me that was living in America, and finding the darkness that lied beneath the streets of Los Angeles". "Midnight", which he dubbed a "massive rock and roll power ballad of sorts" in the style of Jim Steinman and Bruce Springsteen, served as the catalyst for the creation of the EP, due to the positive reaction of people outside the band when listening to it prior to release.

== Chart performance ==
During the week of its release, American Noir was initially on track to debut at number 5 on the UK Albums Chart, the same position as Sex, Death & the Infinite Void. By the end of the week, it had remained at number 13 on the chart. The EP also topped the UK Rock & Metal Albums Chart, number 5 on the Scottish Albums Chart, and number 18 on the UK Albums Downloads Chart.

== Critical reception ==
Professional ratings
Review scores
Source	Rating
DIY	5/5 stars
Dork	4/5 stars
Gigwise	10/10 stars
Kerrang!	4/5 stars
The Line of Best Fit	6/10
NME	4/5 stars

American Noir received critical acclaim from music critics. Gigwise writer Vicky Greer gave the EP a perfect 10-star rating, claiming that the release was even better than its full-length predecessor. Greer praised the "theatricality" and "dark tone" of the release, proposing that "Creeper took on a Herculean task following up on the near-perfect Sex, Death & the Infinite Void and somehow, they've made an even better record than they did last summer." Ben Tipple of DIY also gave the EP a perfect score, comparing it stylistically to Meat Loaf's 1977 debut album Bat Out of Hell and describing it as "a vibrant and fitting homage to the recently departed Jim Steinman". Kerrang! writer James Hickie wrote that the EP "is full of sweeter, more theatrical confections than its predecessor", calling it a "lovely, rousing rock opera".

Many reviews focused on the vocal interplay between Gould and Greenwood, as well as the increased vocal presence of the latter. Greer described the keyboardist's voice as "breathtaking", while Tipple claimed that the co-vocal performances "embody the dynamic relationship between the music's protagonists". Reviewing the EP for Dork magazine, Dillon Eastoe wrote that "Creeper are at their best when [Gould] and [Greenwood] share out the vocal duties, and this is where they find space to delve further on American Noir." Marie Oleinik of The Line of Best Fit noted that Greenwood "confidently takes the central stage" on the release, suggesting that her increased presence should continue on future releases by the band: "Some of Creeper's tricks may have become repetitive and predictable, but whichever direction they take after the [Sex, Death & the Infinite Void] cycle, they probably can't go wrong as long as there are plenty of Greenwood's vocal contributions."

== Track listing ==
No.	Title	Writer(s)	Length
1.	"Midnight Militia" (intro)	Will Gould; Ian Miles	1:15
2.	"Midnight"	Gould; Miles; Hannah Greenwood	3:39
3.	"America at Night"	Gould; Xandy Barry	3:25
4.	"Ghosts Over Calvary"	Gould; Greenwood; Barry	3:15
5.	"The Drowning Room" (interlude)	Miles	0:37
6.	"One of Us"	Gould; Miles; Barry	3:23
7.	"Damned and Doomed"	Gould; Miles; Greenwood	2:37
8.	"Frozen Night" (outro)	Miles	0:59
Total length:			19:10

== Personnel ==
Creeper

- Will Gould – vocals (lead on tracks 3 and 6; co-lead on track 2)
- Ian Miles – guitar, bass (track 4), production and mixing (tracks 1, 5 and 8)
- Hannah Greenwood – keyboards, piano, vocals (lead on tracks 4 and 7; co-lead on track 2)
- Sean Scott – bass (tracks 2, 6 and 7)

Additional personnel

- Xandy Barry – production, engineering, mixing, keyboards and programming (tracks 2–4, 6 and 7); arrangements (tracks 3 and 7); guitar and bass (track 3)
- Randy Cooke – drums (tracks 2, 4 and 6)
- Kiel Feher – drums (tracks 3)
- Dan Bratton – drums (track 7)
- Timothy Williams – arrangements (tracks 3 and 7)
- Redah Haddioui – engineering and mixing assistance (tracks 2–4, 6 and 7)
- Richard Woodcraft – engineering (tracks 2–4, 6 and 7)
- Andrew Lappin – engineering (track 6)
- Harris Newcomb – photography

== Charts ==
Chart performance for American Noir
Chart (2021)	Peak position
Scottish Albums (OCC)	5
UK Albums (OCC)	13
UK Albums Downloads (OCC)	18
UK Albums Sales (OCC)	4
UK Physical Albums (OCC)	4
UK Rock & Metal Albums (OCC)	1
UK Vinyl Albums (OCC)	3
