= Sounds from the Void =

EP by Creeper
- Released: 14 May 2021
- Recorded: 2020
- Genre: Horror punk; punk rock; emo; gothic rock
- Length: 10:36
- Label: Roadrunner
- Producer: Ian Miles

Creeper chronology
Sex, Death & the Infinite Void (2020)	Sounds from the Void (2021)	American Noir (2021)

Sounds from the Void is the fifth extended play (EP) by English rock band Creeper. Produced by the band's guitarist Ian Miles, the collection of acoustic cover versions was initially released in the form of two individual songs during the summer of 2020, before the full three-track EP was issued on streaming platforms on 14 May 2021.

== Background ==
Creeper first announced Sounds from the Void on 14 May 2020, at the same time as their second album Sex, Death & the Infinite Void was delayed to July that year. The first track of the series, a cover of King Dude's "Spiders in Her Hair" performed by vocalist Will Gould and guitarist Ian Miles, followed the next day. On 9 July, a cover of Neil Young and Crazy Horse's "My My, Hey Hey (Out of the Blue)" followed, which Gould revealed had been the inspiration for the band's early song "Into the Black", featured on their 2014 self-titled debut EP. The EP was released on streaming platforms on 14 May 2021 with an added cover of the Ramones track "Pet Sematary".

== Track listing ==
No.	Title	Writer(s)	Length
1.	"Pet Sematary" (Ramones cover)	Dee Dee Ramone; Daniel Rey	4:06
2.	"My My, Hey Hey (Out of the Blue)" (Neil Young and Crazy Horse cover)	Neil Young; Jeff Blackburn	4:00
3.	"Spiders in Her Hair" (King Dude cover)	King Dude	2:30

== Personnel ==
- Will Gould – vocals
- Hannah Greenwood – vocals
- Ian Miles – guitar, vocals, production
