= Hypnotic (song) =

Single by Zella Day

from the EP Zella Day and the album Kicker
- Released: February 27, 2015
- Recorded: 2014
- Studio: Wax Ltd Studios (Los Angeles); Blueprint Studios (Los Angeles)
- Genre: Alternative; folk; pop
- Length: 2:56
- Label: Pinetop; Hollywood
- Songwriters: Zella Day; Nick Bailey; Xandy Barry; Ryan Ogren
- Producers: Wax Ltd; Blueprint

Zella Day singles chronology
"Compass" (2014)	"Hypnotic" (2015)	"High" (2015)

Music video
- "Hypnotic" on YouTube

"Hypnotic" is a song recorded by American singer-songwriter Zella Day for her second extended play (EP) Zella Day (2014) and her second studio album Kicker (2015). Initially released as a promotional single on October 23, 2014, it was serviced to US Adult album alternative and modern rock radio on January 26, 2015. It was later re-released digitally on February 27, 2015, as the latter record's lead single through Pinetop Records and Hollywood Records. The song was written by Day, Nick Bailey, Xandy Barry, and Ryan Orgen. Production was handled by Wally Gagel and Xandy Barry of Wax Ltd, with additional production from Blueprint. Musically, "Hypnotic" is an alternative, folk, pop song with hip-hop, country and dream pop influences. Lyrically, it discusses the struggle and eventual loss of power in a new relationship.

"Hypnotic" peaked at number 25 on the US Adult Alternative Airplay and number 28 on the US Adult Top 40. It was later certified gold by the Recording Industry Association of America. A music video for the song was directed by Gianennio Salucci and produced by Rod Hamilton. The video premiered on the same day of its release. It features Day driving in the desert, her sitting in a bathtub with a horse, and dancing in a room with a checkerboard pattern.

== Background and composition ==
"Hypnotic" was written by Day, Nick Bailey, Xandy Barry, and Ryan Orgen, and was produced by Wally Gagel and Xandy Barry of Wax Ltd, with additional production from Blueprint. On October 23, 2014, the song was released to the iTunes Store as part of their "Free Singles of the Week" program. The song is a hybrid of alternative, folk, and pop genres, with hip-hop, country and dream pop influences. Written in F-sharp minor, "Hypnotic" is accompanied with bass and an "offbeat rhythm". Day's vocals range from G♯_{3} to D5, with the song having a tempo of 80 beats per minute.

Lyrically, the song discusses the struggle and eventual loss of power in a new relationship. In an interview with Untitled, Day stated, "'Hypnotic' is about the loss of power through physicality in a new relationship. When I moved to California, I was really testing the waters with partying...for the first time." Day expands this by saying, "I was...really figuring out how to feel powerful. It was really hard to feel powerful being physical with somebody that you’re not in a relationship with." In an interview with AllAccess, Day said, "['Hypnotic'] is an accumulation of experiences stitched together to translate a bigger meaning. This song is about losing yourself in a shallow sexual relationship."

== Critical reception ==
Ethan Germann from Atwood acclaimed Day's choice of releasing "Hypnotic" as a single and complimented the soaring chorus and captivating vocals. Emilee Atkinson, a student columnist for Weber State University's The Signpost, singled out the track for bringing a positive light to sadcore music; she claimed: "for listeners who aren't normally fans of this type of music, Zella Day is a good place to start." Jacob Brown from Vogue recognized the song as a "pop gem" and compared its rhythm to that of Christina Aguilera's music and the lyrics to Lana Del Rey's works.

== Music video ==
An accompanying music video for the single was released on February 27, 2015. The visuals were directed by Gianennio Salucci and produced by Rod Hamilton. Day spent a week writing the script for the video. Day spoke of the symbolism within the plot:

Yeah, but there's a lot of symbolism in that video. The horse represents this pure, unjaded, unfazed love. In the video, we are both, me and my love interest, kind of going through phases of having the horse in our possession. In the beginning of the video, he has the horse, and then I do. It's kind of this fight, it's just a war between us, and Mickey kind of represents what we're trying to win. Then you have the black snake that kind of represents tainted love.

== Live performances and other usage ==
When touring in Minneapolis, Minnesota, the singer performed "Hypnotic" live in Studio C at the KTCZ-FM broadcast hall. The song was featured in The Vampire Diaries, Pretty Little Liars, and The Royals.

== Personnel ==
Performance credits

- Zella Day – vocals

Instruments

- Zella Day – guitar
- Xandy Barry – keyboard
- Ryan Orgen – keyboard, guitar

Production

- Wax Ltd – production
  - Xandy Barry – mixer, recording engineer, programmer
  - Wally Gagel – mixer, recording engineer, programmer
- Blueprint – production, engineer
- Ryan Orgen - programmer
- Brian Blake – recording assistant
- Howie Weinburg – mastering

== Charts ==
Chart performance for "Hypnotic"
Chart (2015–2016)	Peak position
US Adult Alternative Airplay (Billboard)	25
US Adult Pop Airplay (Billboard)	28

== Certifications ==
Certifications for "Hypnotic"
Region	Certification	Certified units/sales
United States (RIAA)	Gold	500,000^{‡}
^{‡} Sales+streaming figures based on certification alone.

== Release history ==
Release history and formats for "Hypnotic"
Region	Date	Format	Label	Ref.
United States	January 26, 2015	Adult album alternative	Pinetop; Hollywood	
United States	January 26, 2015	Modern rock	Pinetop; Hollywood	
United States	February 27, 2015	Digital download	Pinetop; Hollywood	
Germany	March 3, 2015	Digital download	Universal Music	
United States	November 2, 2015	Hot adult contemporary	Pinetop; Hollywood	
United States	January 15, 2016	Vanic remix	Pinetop; Hollywood	
