= Only a Dream (Zella Day song) =

Single by Zella Day

from the EP Where Does the Devil Hide
- Released: July 31, 2020
- Recorded: 2019
- Length: 3:38
- Label: Easy Eye Sound; Concord
- Songwriters: Zella Day; Dan Auerbach; Dan Nigro
- Producers: Dan Auerbach; Dan Nigro

Zella Day singles chronology
"Purple Haze" (2020)	"Only a Dream" (2020)	"Benny My Dear" (2020)

"Only a Dream" is a song by American singer-songwriter Zella Day, released as the fourth single from her EP Where Does the Devil Hide on July 31, 2020. The song was written by Day, Dan Auerbach, and Dan Nigro, with the latter two producing the song. After being teased in 2017, the song was officially released through Concord Records and Easy Eye Sound in 2020. An accompanying video for the song was directed by Saamuel Richard and Gianennio Salucci and released in July 2020.

== Background and composition ==
A ballad with classical pop and indie rock influences, Day has described the song as "living in the memory of what was eventually becomes a memory in itself." Day originally premiered the song on February 17, 2017 during a live performance. She later teased the song again during an Instagram live stream during which she referred to it as "Devil Hides". After departing from her previous label, Day spent the summer of 2019 reworking several songs and recording them alongside The Black Keys' Dan Auerbach.

After being reworked and given a new title, the song was the fourth song released ahead of the released of Day's EP, which is named after a line in the song. Day's friend, Lana Del Rey, promoted the video for the song on her social media accounts.

== Music video ==
Released on July 31, 2020, the video for the song was filmed in San Luis Obispo, California, with several scenes taking place at the Madonna Inn. The video was directed by Saamuel Richard and long-time collaborator Gianennio Salucci, with the former also serving as Day's love interest. On top of co-directing, Richard served as the art director while Salucci edited the piece.

The video chronicles the lovers as they drive along the coast, lay on the beach, have intimate moments in their hotel room, and get into an argument in a city street at night. The clips are accompanied by cutaways to Day in the field, with the final clips featuring her wearing clown-like makeup similar to what she wears on the cover artwork of the EP. The video follows in suit of the previous videos for the EP with its vintage, 1960s aesthetic.

== Critical reception ==
Lina Savage of Flaunt magazine was positive in her review of the song, commenting how "Day is here to pilot your much needed escape with surreal transcendence through the garden of love."

The West News described the video as "an intimately-filmed and emotionally-charged love story", commenting how "it’s a poetic ode to the sprawling, beautiful and sometimes tragic journey that is love." Michael Marotta of Vanyaland praised the video as being a "California dream" and a "trip outside of reality".
