= Ryan Ogren =

American record producer

- Also known as: Ryan OG
- Born: Ryan John Ogren; 1979 or 1980 (age 45–46)
- Origin: Vineland, New Jersey, U.S.
- Genres: Pop; rock; R&B
- Occupations: Singer; songwriter; record producer
- Labels: Nitro; Kemosabe; Prescription

Ryan John Ogren (born 1979 or 1980), also known as Ryan OG, is an American songwriter, record producer and vocal producer signed to Prescription Songs. He began his musical career playing in the band Don't Look Down, and then later Over It and Runner Runner. He has since written and produced records for artists like Lourdiz, Doja Cat, Maroon 5, The Kid Laroi, Nicki Minaj, Kim Petras, Saweetie, Lil Wayne, Coi Leray, Dirty Heads, amongst others.

Raised in Vineland, New Jersey, Ogren attended Vineland High School.

== Career ==
=== Band career ===
==== Don't Look Down ====
As the vocalist/guitarist/songwriter in Don't Look Down, Ogren was signed to Nitro Records (Dexter Holland of The Offspring's label) and toured with Fall Out Boy, Yellowcard, and many others.

==== Over It ====
In 2005, Ogren joined Over It as a guitarist, keyboardist, and background vocalist. The band was signed to Virgin Records and released Step Outside Yourself.

==== Runner Runner ====
Members of Over It and Rufio joined together to form Runner Runner, which was signed to EMI and achieved radio success with their songs "So Obvious" (charted at No. 34 on the pop charts) and "I Can't Wait".

=== Songwriting career ===
In 2012, Ogren began recording records for other artists. He co-wrote the Gold single "Say You're Just A Friend (Feat Flo Rida)" by Austin Mahone, and shortly thereafter signed an exclusive publishing deal with Prescription Songs. In coming years, Ogren collaborated with numerous artists including Lil Durk, Jack & Jack, Maroon 5, Backstreet Boys, Steve Aoki, Kim Petras, Doja Cat, Lauv, and many more.

== Selected Songwriting and Production Discography ==
Year	Title	Artist	Album	Role
2023	"All My Life"	Lil Durk (feat. J Cole)	Almost Healed	Writer
2023	"Alone"	Kim Petras & Nicki Minaj	Single	Writer, Vocal Producer
2023	"Rescue Me"	Dirty Heads	Single	Producer, Writer
2022	"Love of My Life"	Jennifer Lopez	Marry Me (Original Motion Picture Soundtrack)	Writer, Vocal Producer
2022	"Freaky Deaky"	Doja Cat & Tyga	Single	Producer, Writer
2022	"Sl*t Pop"	Kim Petras	Sl*t Pop	Writer
2022	"Superpower B*tch"	Kim Petras	Sl*t Pop	Writer
2022	"XXX"	Kim Petras	Sl*t Pop	Writer
2022	"Throat Goat"	Kim Petras	Sl*t Pop	Writer
2022	"Life's Been Good"	Dirty Heads	Single	Producer, Writer
2022	"Blick Blick"	Coi Leray with Nicki Minaj	Single	Producer, Writer
2022	"Anxiety"	Coi Leray	Single	Producer, Writer
2022	"Closer feat H.E.R"	Saweetie	Single	Producer, Writer
2022	"26"	Lauv	Single	Writer
2022	"The Best"	Erica Banks	Single	Producer, Writer
2021	"Coconuts"	Kim Petras	Single	Producer, Writer
2021	"Lean On Me"	Cheat Codes (feat. Tinashe)	Single	Producer, Writer
2021	"Back Seat"	Saweetie (feat. Lourdiz)	Pretty Summer Playlist: Season 1	Producer, Writer
2021	"Can't Buy Love"	B-Case & Robin Schulz (feat. Baby E)	Single	Writer
2021	"Headspace"	Dirty Heads	The Best of Dirty Heads	Producer, Writer
2020	"Nobody's Love"	Maroon 5	Single	Producer, Writer
2020	"F*CK YOU, GOODBYE (feat. Machine Gun Kelly)"	The Kid LAROI	F*CK LOVE (SAVAGE)	Producer, Writer
2020	"Hate The Way (feat. blackbear)"	G-Eazy	Single	Producer, Writer
2020	"Trust Nobody (feat. Adam Levine)"	Lil Wayne	Funeral	Producer, Writer
2020	"Shimmy (feat. Doja Cat)"	Lil Wayne	Funeral	Producer, Writer
2020	"Come Back To Me (feat. Shaylen)"	Chantel Jeffries	Single	Producer, Writer
2020	"Easy"	John King	Single	Producer, Writer
2020	"Bum Bum (feat. Villain Park)"	Dirty Heads	Single	Producer, Writer
2019	"Can I"	Kiana Lede	Myself	Producer, Writer
2019	"Nobody Else"	Backstreet Boys	DNA	Producer, Writer
2019	"Breathe"	Backstreet Boys	DNA	Writer, Vocal Producer
2019	"No One Compares To You"	Jack & Jack	A Good Friend Is Nice	Vocal Producer
2019	"2 Cigarettes"	Jack & Jack	A Good Friend Is Nice	Producer, Writer
2019	"Barcelona"	Jack & Jack	A Good Friend Is Nice	Producer, Writer
2019	"Poquito (feat. Swae Lee)"	Anitta	Kisses	Producer, Writer
2019	"Take Me Home"	Dreamers	LAUNCH FLY LAND	Producer, Writer
2019	"Blow It All"	Kim Petras	Clarity	Writer
2019	"Lift Me Up"	Dirty Heads	Super Moon	Writer
2019	"Horsefly"	Dirty Heads	Super Moon	Writer
2019	"Come Back Around"	Dirty Heads	Super Moon	Writer
2019	"Nikes"	Jake Miller	BASED ON A TRUE STORY.	Producer, Writer
2018	Waste It on Me (feat. BTS)	Steve Aoki	Single	Writer
2018	I Don't Know	Jack & Jack	Single	Producer, Writer
2018	Stay With Me	Jack & Jack	Single	Producer, Writer
2018	Closure	Jack & Jack	Single	Producer, Writer
2018	sayer	nothing,nowhere.	ruiner	Writer
2018	Myself (feat. DRAM)	Snow Tha Product	Single	Producer, Writer
2018	"Visions"	Dirty Heads	Single	Writer
2018	"Fake It Til You Make It"	DREAMERS	Launch	Producer, Writer
2018	"Misfits T-shirt"	DREAMERS	FLY	Producer, Writer
2018	"All Washed Out"	DREAMERS	FLY	Producer, writer
2018	"The Last Love Song"	DREAMERS	FLY	Producer, Writer
2018	"4 LIFE"	Lil Aaron	ROCK$TAR FAMOU$	Producer, Writer
2018	"Anymore (feat. Kim Petras)"	Lil Aaron	ROCK$TAR FAMOU$	Producer, Writer
2018	"Quit (feat. Trais Barker)"	Lil Aaron	ROCK$TAR FAMOU$	Producer, Writer
2018	"Sometimes"	Lil Aaron	ROCK$TAR FAMOU$	Producer, Writer
2017	"Visions"	Maroon 5	Red Pill Blues	Producer, Writer
2017	"Priceless"	Trey Songz	Tremaine the Album	Producer, Writer
2017	"Money"	Blake Shelton	Texoma Shore	Producer, Writer
2017	"Distraction"	Jack & Jack	Gone	Producer, Writer
2017	"Appreciation"	Terror Jr	Bop City 2: TerroRising	Producer, Writer
2017	"Personal"	Terror Jr	Bop City 2: TerroRising	Producer, Writer
2016	"Astronaut"	Jake Miller	Overnight	Producer, Writer
2016	"Painkiller"	Dreamers	This Album Does Not Exist	Producer, Writer
2016	"Oxygen"	Dirty Heads	Dirty Heads	Producer, Writer
2016	"Suitcase"	Before You Exit	All The Lights	Producer, Writer, Mixer
2016	"Old Guitar"	BUNT.	Single	Writer
2016	"Farewell"	Simple Plan	Taking One for the Team	Writer
2015	Marching Band (feat. Juicy J)	R. Kelly	The Buffet	Writer
2015	Boom!	Simple Plan	Taking One for the Team	Writer
2015	Mañana	Los 5	Single	Writer, Vocal Producer
2014	Hypnotic	Zella Day	Kicker	Producer, Writer
2014	Champagne for the Pain	Niykee Heaton	Bad Intentions	Producer, Writer
2014	"Numbers"	The Cab	Lock Me Up	Producer, Writer
2014	Stand Up	The Cab	Lock Me Up	Producer, Writer
2013	Sleepwalking	The Chain Gang of 1974	Daydream	Producer, Writer
2013	Song for You (feat. Karmin)	Big Time Rush	24/Seven	Producer, Writer
2013	Fashionably Late	Falling In Reverse	Single	Producer, Writer
2013	I Love LA	Emblem 3	Nothing to Lose	Producer, Writer
2012	Say You're Just a Friend (feat. Flo Rida)	Austin Mahone	Single	Writer
