= Sex, Death & the Infinite Void =

2020 album by Creeper

Studio album by Creeper
- Released: 31 July 2020
- Recorded: 2019
- Studios: Wax Ltd, Los Angeles, US; The Firepit, London, UK; The Ranch Production House, Southampton, UK
- Genres: Glam rock; rock and roll; gothic rock; Americana
- Length: 40:10
- Label: Roadrunner
- Producer: Xandy Barry

Creeper chronology
Christmas (2017)	Sex, Death & the Infinite Void (2020)	Sounds from the Void (2021)

Singles from Sex, Death & the Infinite Void
- 1. "Born Cold" Released: 3 November 2019; 2. "Annabelle" Released: 20 January 2020; 3. "Cyanide" Released: 28 February 2020; 4. "All My Friends" Released: 22 May 2020; 5. "Be My End" Released: 18 June 2020; 6. "Poisoned Heart" Released: 24 July 2020

Sex, Death & the Infinite Void is the second studio album by the English rock band Creeper, released on 31 July 2020 by Roadrunner Records. The album was produced by Wax Ltd's Xandy Barry.

Unlike the band's previous album, which was described as horror punk, this album takes influence from Roy Orbison, David Bowie, as well as Britpop and 1970s' British rock and roll. Like the band's first album, Eternity, in Your Arms, it is a concept album, this time about the story of an angel who, upon coming to Earth to warn society about the end of the world and judgement day, falls from grace as he experiences love for the first time. The story takes place in a small Californian town inspired by Dunsmuir, as well as the TV show Twin Peaks. Each of the singles' music videos is built around the album's narrative.

It is also the final release with the drummer Dan Bratton, who left the band in September 2020 for undisclosed reasons.

== Background and recording ==
Following the release of Eternity, in Your Arms, the members of Creeper began searching for ideas for a subsequent concept album. While touring the United States with Waterparks in 2017, they found themselves in Dunsmuir, California, which would be the basis for the setting of the album, the small town of Calvary Falls. The cultural differences and otherness that Gould began to experience on this tour and the 2017 Warped Tour then inspired the album's story of an angel who falls to Earth and finds himself an outsider on a different world.

In November 2018, the band played the last show of the Eternity, in Your Arms album cycle at the KOKO in Camden Town, London. Before the final song, "Misery", the frontman Will Gould said, "Not only is it the last show of this album, but it's the last show that we'll ever do," an almost word-for-word quote of David Bowie's speech at the Hammersmith Apollo on July 3, 1973, when he killed off the character of Ziggy Stardust on stage. Gould wrote that "the idea was to end it in the same way it began, and the campaign began with a disappearing act".

Following this, Gould and Miles would make multiple travels to and from Los Angeles in search of producers for their subsequent record, soon deciding on Xandy Barry. However, as the pair planned to temporarily relocate to the city to write and record the album, Miles entered a psychotic episode as a result of his bipolar disorder, and was admitted to a psychiatric hospital. Gould described the year between the KOKO performance and the band's return as "the worst year of my life" as during Miles' mental health struggle, Gould's relationship with his fiancée began declining and his mother's partner died. Furthermore, when Gould returned to Los Angeles without Miles, he began to struggle with anxiety, experiencing his first two panic attacks, and soon turning to alcohol and spending time in the studio as a way to cope. Due to this, both Gould and Miles considered disbanding Creeper. However, Miles' mental health began to recover and his wife eventually bought him a guitar so that he and Gould could write songs together over FaceTime.

== Promotion and release ==
On 1 November 2019, a year to the day after Creeper's supposed disbandment at the KOKO, they performed at Club 229 in London under the name Fugitives of Heaven. During this performance, they debuted the song "Born Cold", which was then released on 3 November. The band also announced a supporting slot on Babymetal's 2020 Metal Galaxy world tour. The album was officially announced on 10 January 2020 for a 22 May release date alongside a UK tour. The album's second single "Annabelle" was released on 20 January, followed by the third single "Cyanide" on 28 February. On 5 May, the band announced that the album's release and the following tour dates would be delayed due to the 2020 COVID-19 pandemic, with the release date now set for 31 July, and the tour set for the end of August. On 22 May, the fourth single "All My Friends" was released. On 8 July, the supporting tour dates were subsequently delayed the end of March 2021, then on 24 July, the sixth single "Poisoned Heart" was released. On 30 July, the day before the album's official release, the online event Creeper Con was held, in which the band released the music video for "Poisoned Heart", unreleased footage from their KOKO performance and Creeper: The Story Of... Sex, Death & Infinite Void: a series of podcasts produced by Mighty Moon Media recalled the creation of the album.

During the album's writing and recording process, more songs were completed than the sixteen tracks that made it onto the album. Eight of these unreleased tracks were released on 30 July 2021, as the American Noir EP.

== Composition ==
=== Musical style ===
Critics have categorised the album as rock and roll, gothic rock, Americana and glam rock, with songs also incorporating elements of pop punk, rockabilly and country music.

During the album's writing process, Creeper made an active effort to destroy and rebuild their sound into something completely different than their early output. In an interview with Upset magazine, Gould expressed how he had become disheartened by the band's frequent comparisons to groups such as AFI, Alkaline Trio and My Chemical Romance, stating "We were constantly told we sounded like these bands, but none of them actually sounded similar to us. It was impossible to sound like us. I wanted us to be our own thing... We love those bands, but it got to the point where it felt like a lazy comparison. By the end of it, I was literally saying ‘If I have to answer another question about somebody else’s band I’m going to go crazy’ – I think it’s important to level with these things and build something brand new."

Instead, Gould, turned to his childhood for influence. Having experienced the height of the 1990s Britpop movement, which was fronted by Oasis, Blur, Suede and Pulp. At the same time, he was discovering his father and stepmother's record collection, which was how he was exposed to the music of David Bowie. While beginning to write the album, the band analysed the shared musical elements of each of these styles, which they began to understand as a "British sound". Bowie's sixth album Aladdin Sane was a particularly prominent influence, along with T. Rex, Roxy Music, Mott the Hoople and the Beatles. Then, as the album was based and recorded in the United States, they also dissected what American music was, settling on the music of Bruce Springsteen, Dick Dale, surf rock and Motown. The basis of the album's sound was the merger of these two cultural influences. Gould cited the "pop sensibilities" of Springsteen and Cyndi Lauper as well as the "apocalyptic romanticism" of Roy Orbison's Mystery Girl album as influences. Another American influence was Type O Negative. The song "Poisoned Heart" was influenced by Nick Cave and Leonard Cohen.

=== Lyrical content ===
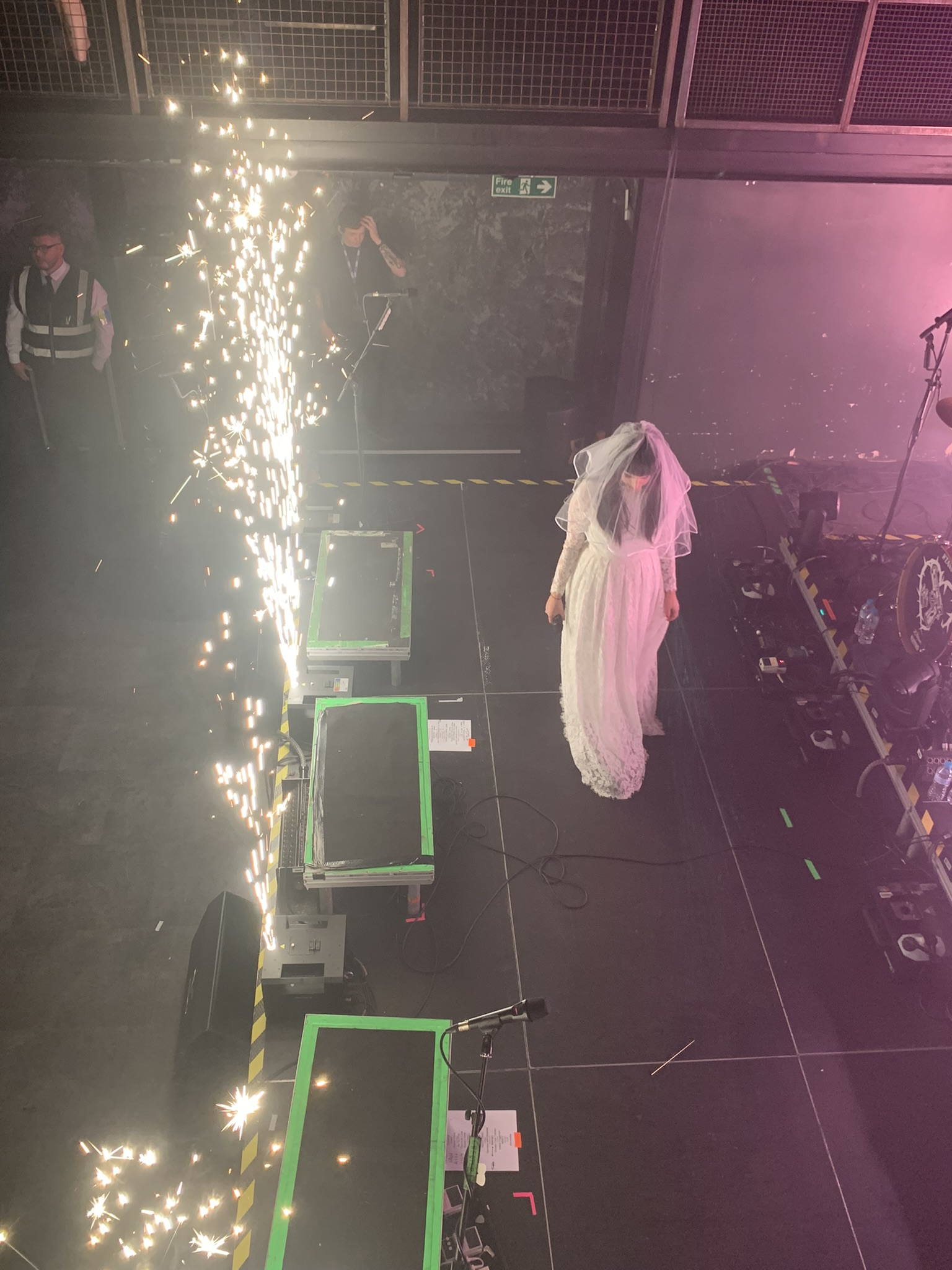
Hannah Greenwood portraying the album's character Annabelle

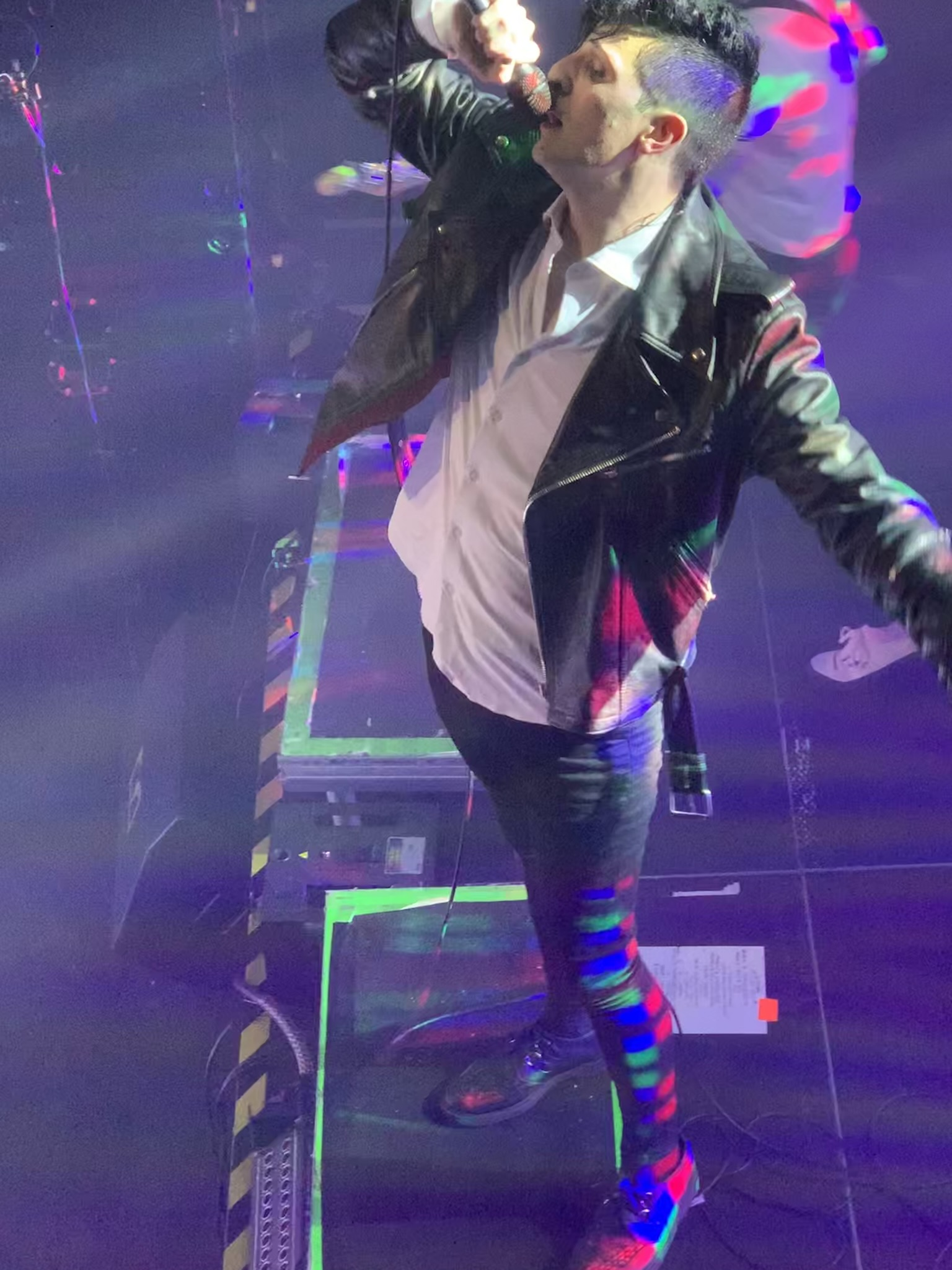
Will Gould portraying the album's character Roe

The lyrics of Sex, Death & the Infinite Void are "about being grown up. It’s about sex, death and the infinite void. It’s about alienation – it’s about feeling like you’re living in someone else’s world and it’s about learning what it is to be human." Gould stated "there are songs about battles with alcoholism and crazy nights out," "but there’s also a real heart to it and a real sadness to the whole thing."

The album narrative is set in the fictional United States town of Calvary Falls. One day, the mysterious and genderless Roe (portrayed by Gould), comes to the Calvary Falls with a prophecy that the town will end forever in seven days and then he will return to where he came from. Although it is unclear as to whether Roe is actually an angel or simply delusional, he falls in love with Annabelle (portrayed by Greenwood and Patricia Morrison), a Calvary Falls resident who is engaged to the abusive Buddy Calvary, from the richest family in town. Roe and Annabelle begin an affair and Roe turns to drugs and alcohol, these sins making Roe more human, but unbeknownst to him, this needed to happen to complete the prophecy. On the seventh day, Roe is shot and killed by Calvary.

Each of the narrative's major plot points were influenced by real events that the band went through in the United States during both their time touring in 2017, and their time writing and recording the album in 2019. The album's sixteen track runtime encompasses three acts: Sex; Death; and the Infinite Void. Many of the songs on Sex were influenced by the nightlife of Los Angeles, particularly the band's time at goth and fetish clubs. The star-crossed love story of "Cyanide" was informed by Gould's growing love for Creeper's makeup artist, occasional music video and live performance actor and album artwork model Charlotte Clutterbuck, whom he would soon begin a relationship with. Some of the songs on Death were influenced by the city's death museums and tours which the band attended, seeing the car Jayne Mansfield died in and the grave of Maila Nurmi, as well as the death of Gould's mother's partner. "Annabelle" specifically was influenced by the band's 2017 counterprotest against the Westboro Baptist Church, after which the church called the band "100% Satanic – all they have is death". The Infinite Void encompassed a more abstract feeling the band experienced during the album's writing process such as Gould's growing alcohol dependence, disappearance from public life and the mental health of the band's members. "All My Friends" was expressly influenced by Miles' time in a psychiatric hospital.

The album makes frequent pop culture references. Lyrically, "Cyanide" references Donnie Darko (2001), as "Napalm Girls" does with Fight Club (1999), and the voice used for Patricia Morrison's Annabelle is an imitation of Madame Leota from The Haunted Mansion (2003). Furthermore, the original basis of this plot was influenced by Gene Brewer's 1995 novel K-PAX, which follows a mysterious man who believes he is an alien being put into a psychiatric ward. Roe was crafted around the "selfish, narcissistic" David Bowie character the Thin White Duke.

== Critical reception ==
Professional ratings
Aggregate scores
Source	Rating
AnyDecentMusic?	8.6/10
Metacritic	91/100
Review scores
Source	Rating
AllMusic	4.5/5 stars
Beats Per Minute	80%
DIY	5/5 stars
Gigwise	9/10
Kerrang!	5/5 stars
The Line of Best Fit	7/10
NME	4/5 stars
Q	4/5 stars
The Sunday Times	4/5 stars
Upset	5/5 stars

Sex, Death & the Infinite Void received widespread acclaim from music critics. Aggregating website Metacritic reports a normalised rating of 91 based on eight critical reviews, indicating "universal acclaim" for the release. Many critics praised the album's shift in tone described by DIY as being "tinged with a more moody Americana feel, and doused with faded Hollywood seediness." The band's experimentation with different genres and not restricting themselves to one sound was also praised. "Genre is Dead! Magazine" stated that Gould's vocals had improved over its predecessor, "opting to croon or sing baritone rather than scream".

Louder stated that every song on the album sounds completely distinct and described it as an "exercise in escapism and experimentation" seeing the band "liberated from the constraints of genre, showcasing their immense, diverse talent and creating a new world that holds our attention at a time when that's a difficult thing to pull off." The review for AllMusic claimed it "a sh*t-ton of fun -- a master class in smudged-eyeliner camp directed by a clutch of vampires masquerading as musical theater majors."

Riot Mag compared the album to Danger Days: The True Lives of the Fabulous Killjoys by My Chemical Romance in the way it perfectly captures the same adventure while carrying the "morose weight of actually having to deal with your consequences." Rather than the comparisons to Alkaline Trio and AFI seen on their last album, critics drew comparisons to Nick Cave, Roy Orbison, Roxy Music, David Bowie, Suede, Pulp, Meat Loaf, Blur, Supergrass, Queen and Prince.

== Track listing ==
Songwriting credits per booklet.

No.	Title	Writer(s)	Length
1.	"Hallelujah!"	Will Gould; Hannah Greenwood	0:46
2.	"Be My End"	Gould; Ian Miles; Matt Reynolds	2:39
3.	"Born Cold"	Gould; Miles; Neil Kennedy	2:57
4.	"Cyanide"	Gould; Xandy Barry	3:27
5.	"Celestial Violence"	Gould; Greenwood	0:18
6.	"Annabelle"	Gould; Miles; Barry	3:49
7.	"Paradise"	Gould; Barry	3:49
8.	"Poisoned Heart"	Gould; Miles; Barry	3:28
9.	"Thorns of Love"	Gould; Miles	3:22
10.	"Four Years Ago"	Gould; Greenwood; Barry	3:25
11.	"Holy War"	Gould; Greenwood	0:22
12.	"Napalm Girls"	Gould; Miles; Reynolds	3:34
13.	"The Crown of Life"	Gould; Greenwood	0:07
14.	"Black Moon"	Gould; Miles; Reynolds	3:35
15.	"All My Friends"	Gould	2:48
16.	"Be More Careful With Your Heart"	Gould; Greenwood	1:08
Total length:			40:10

== Personnel ==
Adapted from CD liner notes.

Creeper

- Will Gould – lead vocals
- Ian Miles – guitar
- Oliver Burdett – guitar
- Sean Scott – bass guitar
- Hannah Greenwood – keyboards, backing vocals
- Dan Bratton – drums

Production personnel

- Xandy Barry – production, mixing, engineering, orchestral arrangements and programming
- Timothy Williams - orchestral arrangements and programming
- Spike Stent - mixing
- Redah Haddioui - mix assistant, engineering
- Matt Wolach - mix assistant
- Richard Woodcroft - engineering
- Andrew Lappin - engineering
- Pete Lyman – mastering
- Stuart Hawkes - mastering on track 4

Art design

- Andy Pritchard - layout
- Demon Dance - design of the 'Descending Angel'
- Billy Howard Price - photos

Additional Personnel

- Patricia Morrison- Voice of Annabelle

== Charts ==
Chart performance for Sex, Death & the Infinite Void
Chart (2020)	Peak position
Scottish Albums (Official Charts)	4
UK Albums (Official Charts)	5
