= Neil Krug =

American photographer

Neil Krug is an American photographer. He has photographed Lana Del Rey, Tame Impala, and other musicians.

== Biography ==
Krug grew up in Lawrence, Kansas. He was inspired by old films and television shows. A photo essay of his on Flickr became viral. This led to the 2010 publication of Pulp Art Book, a collection of photos of his girlfriend Joni Harbeck taken with expired Polaroid film. The success of the book lead to Krug being hired by bands in Los Angeles. Following the success of his book, musicians contacted Krug with project offers. At the time, he still lived in Kansas, but the look of the book made many think he was from and based in California. This led to issues with potential jobs, including one project from Mick Jagger which gave him only one day's notice. Krug was not able to take the job leading him to move to Los Angeles a month later.

In 2014, Krug photographed Lana Del Rey for her album Ultraviolence. Del Rey learned of Krug when she was gifted his Pulp Art Book. She initially thought he was dead as her friend stated so when gifting the book. Fans of Del Rey had already seen the potential of the pair and since 2012 had sent Krug messages asking him to collaborate with her. He has photographed her for every subsequent record besides Norman Fucking Rockwell!

For the 2020 Tame Impala album The Slow Rush, Krug and the band traveled to Kolmanskop, Namibia, a tourist attraction in the Namib.

In 2021, he collaborated with writer Jardine Libaire to create The GoldTwinz, an art project and crime novel about the journey of twins Marc and Yvette through the criminal underworld of Florida.
