= Man on the Moon / Hunnie Pie =

2016 single by Zella Day

"Man on the Moon"

Single by Zella Day
- Released: October 21, 2016
- Recorded: 2016
- Length: 4:02
- Label: B3SCI
- Songwriter(s): Zella Day; Dan Nigro
- Producer(s): Dan Nigro

Zella Day singles chronology
| "Mustang Kids" (2016) | "Man on the Moon" (2016) | "You Sexy Thing" (2019) |

"Hunnie Pie"

Single by Zella Day
- Released: November 18, 2016
- Recorded: 2016
- Length: 3:49
- Label: B3SCI
- Songwriter(s): Zella Day; Dan Nigro
- Producer(s): Dan Nigro

Zella Day singles chronology
| "Mustang Kids" (2016) | "Hunnie Pie" (2016) | "You Sexy Thing" (2019) |

"Man on the Moon" and "Hunnie Pie" are two songs that comprise a double single released by American singer Zella Day. Both were written by Day and Dan Nigro, the latter of whom also produced the songs. Released under B3SCI Records, the single was meant to be the lead single from Day's third studio album. The songs remain Day's only releases on B3SCI Records; she left the label in 2018.

== Background and composition ==
Produced by Heavy Duty's Dan Nigro, Nigro and Day co-wrote both of the songs.

When asked about why she wrote the songs, Day told Isis Briones of Teen Vogue that "I was home for a little bit in the beginning of the year because I was done with my European tour, and I had all this good energy coming off the road. I was on fire and instantly wrote a song about a first date titled "Man on the Moon." Then the second called "Hunnie Pie" is about my little sister Mia who actually moved to New York, so both songs are actually influenced by New York in a funny way."

== Critical reception ==
Both songs received critical praise. Collin Robinson of Stereogum praised "Man on the Moon", calling it "a dense, decadent, exquisitely layered song like a thick slice of devil’s food wedding cake." Nicole Ortiz of AudioFemme gave the song a positive review, writing that it is "an ethereal beauty, surreal and dream-like from start to finish. It holds an air of normalcy until every chorus breaks down into the otherworldly again–its ability to capture the transcendental aligns oh so perfectly with the title. Appropriately, each chorus also has vocals that sound like a martian’s." Hayden Manders of Nylon described "Man on the Moon" as "a richly textured four minutes that wrap you in the sweet warmth of freedom. Her voice is brimming with confidence and playfulness", adding that the song "is worth getting lost inside". Tina Roumelitotis of The Daily Listening dubbed the track "dreamy" and commented that it is a "psychedelic, folksy gem".

Arnaud Marty of High Clouds called "Hunnie Pie" a "beautiful psychedelic pop song that should be featured on her upcoming album." Ben Kaye of Consequence of Sound gave the song a positive review "a reverberating day dream, something like a more classically structured St. Vincent if Annie Clark wrote bedroom pop. Even though it's drenched in effects, Day's vocals are simply mesmerizing as she asks, 'What's it gonna take to feel my love?'"

== Promotion and release ==
The joint single was released on 7" white sparkle printed vinyl through B3SCI.

Day performed the song in concert several times, as well as on ONErpm with Ana Lee, as well as an unreleased song titled "Gypsy Girl".

== Commercial performance ==
The double single failed to chart on any official charts, but "Man on the Moon" received 10 million plays on Spotify and "Hunnie Pie" received 3.4 million. Additionally, the songs have one million views combined on YouTube.

== Release history ==
Release history for "Man on the Moon"/"Hunnie Pie"
| Region | Date | Song(s) | Format | Label |
|---|---|---|---|---|
| Various | October 21, 2016 | "Man on the Moon" | Digital download | B3SCI |
| United States | November 18, 2016 | "Man on the Moon" / "Hunnie Pie" | 7-inch vinyl | B3SCI |
