= Turntable Kitchen =

American publication and record label

- Website type: Music Food webzine
- Owners: Matthew & Kasey Hickey
- Creators: Matthew Hickey & Kasey Hickey
- Website: turntablekitchen.com
- Registration: No
- Launched: 2010; 16 years ago
- Current status: Active

Turntable Kitchen is a Seattle-based daily Internet publication and independent record label devoted to music criticism, cooking and food photography. In part, the site has become known for their "Musical Pairings" which consist of recommending music to listen to while enjoying specific recipes. The site was founded by husband and wife duo Kasey and Matthew Hickey in 2010. The focus of the Musical Pairings is on indie rock. However, the range of musical genres covered extends to pop, r&b, hip hop, folk, jazz, World music, and various forms of electronic dance music. They have previously been selected by Saveur Magazine as a "Site We Love". In 2011, Turntable Kitchen launched a monthly subscription service called the Pairings Box. Each shipment of the Pairings Box includes a vinyl record, a collection of three recipes, spices and other dry ingredients used in preparing the recipes, and a "digital mixtape" of new music. The Pairings Box has released exclusive debut singles by indie artists including GEMS, IYES, Cathedrals, Salt Cathedral, and BASECAMP. The Pairings Box has also featured exclusive releases by artists and bands including Mikal Cronin, MØ, Typhoon, Local Natives, and POP ETC. Turntable Kitchen has been featured in UrbanDaddy, Real Simple, and GOOD Magazine.
