= Zella Day =

American singer-songwriter

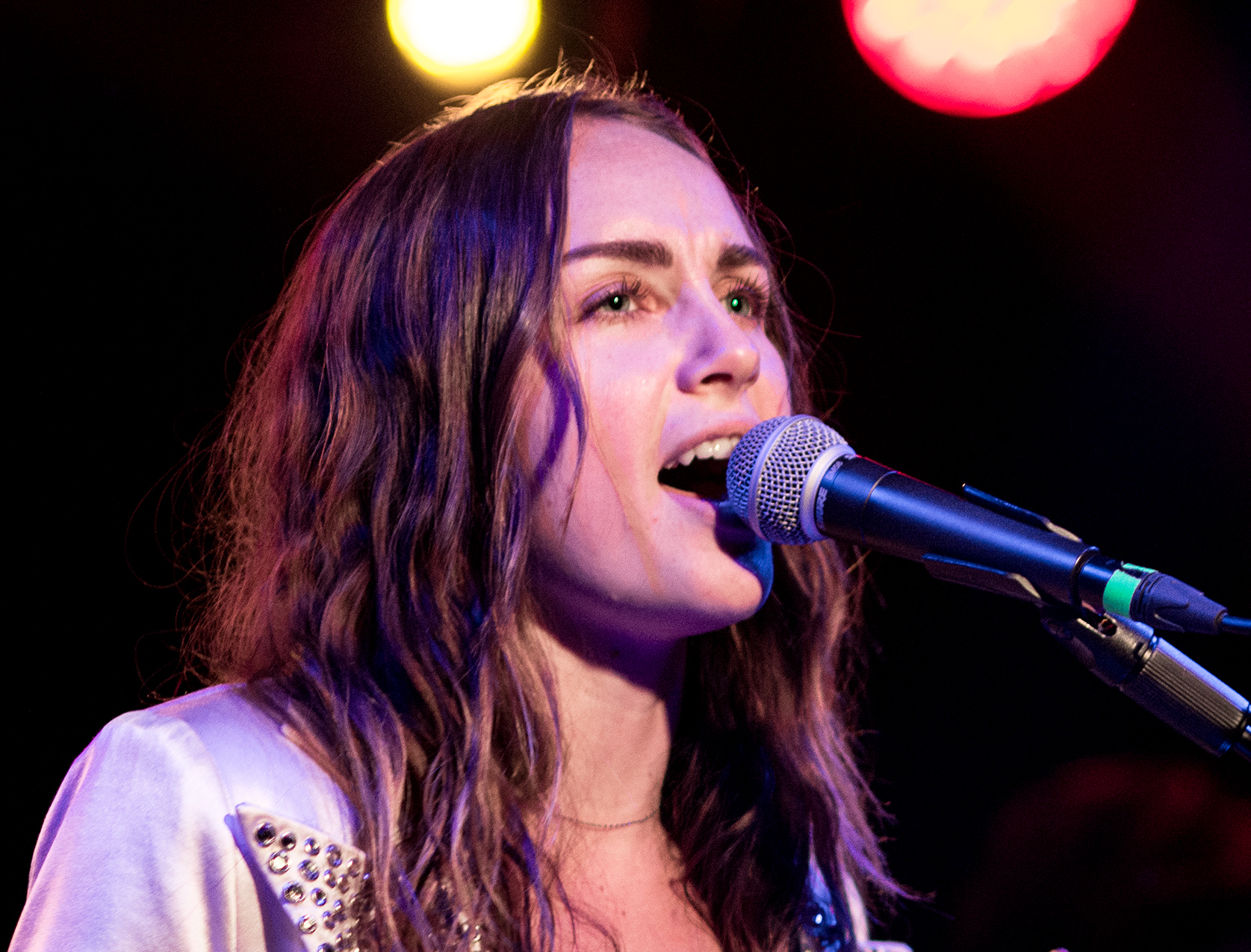
- Day performing in 2017

Background information
- Born: Zella Day Kerr; March 13, 1995 (age 31); Pinetop-Lakeside, Arizona, U.S.
- Genres: Indie pop; desert rock; folk; Americana
- Occupations: Singer; songwriter
- Instruments: Vocals; guitar
- Years active: 2009–present
- Labels: Wax Ltd.; Pinetop; Hollywood; Universal; B3SCI; Concord; Easy Eye Sound
- Member of: Chaparelle
- Spouse: Jesse Woods (m. 2026)
- Website: zelladay.com

Zella Day Kerr (born March 13, 1995) is an American singer, songwriter, and musician.

Day independently released her debut album, Powered by Love (2009), at age 14. Following the success of her cover of "Seven Nation Army", Day worked as a songwriter for BMG and eventually signed with Hollywood Records. After releasing her self-titled EP in 2014, Day released her major label debut album, Kicker (2015), which was preceded by the RIAA-certified single "Hypnotic".

Following a slew of standalone releases, Day released the EP Where Does the Devil Hide (2020) and her third studio album Sunday in Heaven (2022), under Concord Records.

Since 2023, she has been performing music as a member of the country group Chaparelle with her husband Jesse Woods.

== Early life ==
Day was born on March 13, 1995, in the small mountain town of Pinetop-Lakeside in Navajo County, Arizona. She was immersed in the café and art space her parents helped to create in Pinetop-Lakeside. She was first encouraged by her mother to learn guitar as practical means for achieving a sustainable career as a musician. Her first songs, written soon after picking up the guitar at age 9, took influence from the classic singer-songwriter records of her parents and the mystique of the rugged desert landscape around her.

== Career ==
=== 2009–2012: Powered by Love and Cynics vs. Dreamers ===
In 2009, Day self-released her debut album Powered by Love. The album was funded and recorded by a family friend. The initial success of Powered by Love brought the attention of BMG Publishing, who connected her with John Paul White of the Civil Wars and Meghan Trainor for writing sessions.

In 2012, Day self-released her first extended play, Cynics vs Dreamers. The album was produced by Wally Gagel and Xandy Barry of Wax Ltd. "Simple Song" was featured in the film Tooth Fairy 2.

That year she also released a cover of The White Stripes' "Seven Nation Army", which reached number one on Hype Machine's charts. The song received over 50 million plays on Spotify. In 2013, Day was featured on Sultan & Ned Shepard's "All These Roads" alongside Sam Martin. The single, which debuted in early October 2014 on Pete Tong's BBC Radio 1 broadcast, was celebrated by Billboard for its "ebbs and flows with harmonies and rhythmic shifts."

=== 2013–2015: Major label debut with Kicker ===
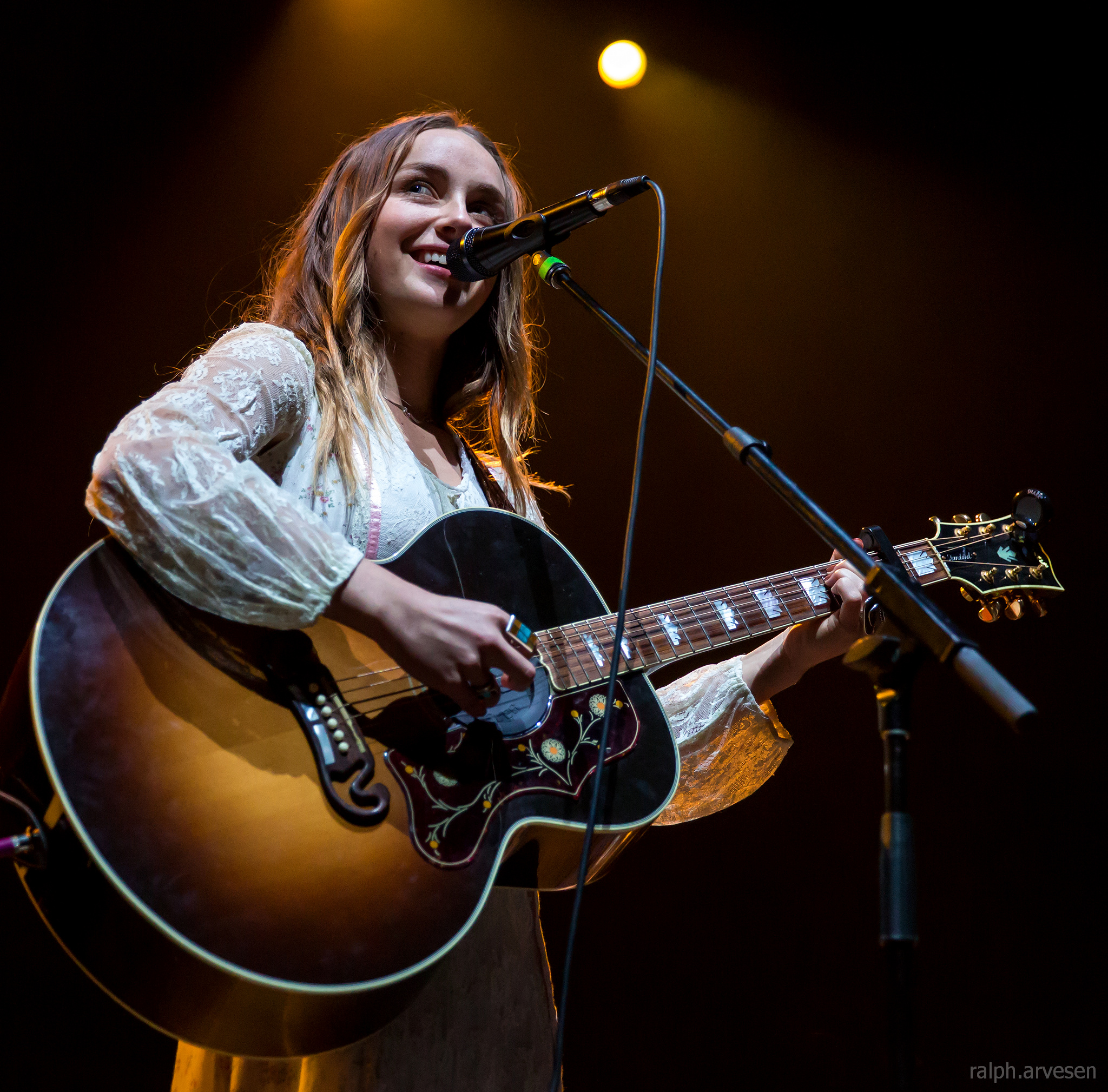
Day performing live in 2015 in Austin, Texas.

In April 2014, "Sweet Ophelia" was released as the first single off of the Zella Day EP with the b-side "1965". The music video was directed by Gianennio Salucci and released on April 7, a day ahead of the 7" release by tastemaker B3Sci Records in coordination with Day's Pinetop Records, an imprint of Hollywood Records.

The Zella Day EP was released on September 23, 2014. It was celebrated as an "intangible tapestry of sound and raw emotion, blanketing the pop, alternative, and folk genres" by Atwood magazine. The EP peaked at No. 16 on the Billboard Heatseekers Chart and garnered critical acclaim. The final track on the EP, "Hypnotic", was picked as an iTunes Single of the Week and was later released as the second single from the album. In December 2014, Day was featured as a guest vocalist on the acoustic version of Borns' "Electric Love" off his debut EP, Candy.

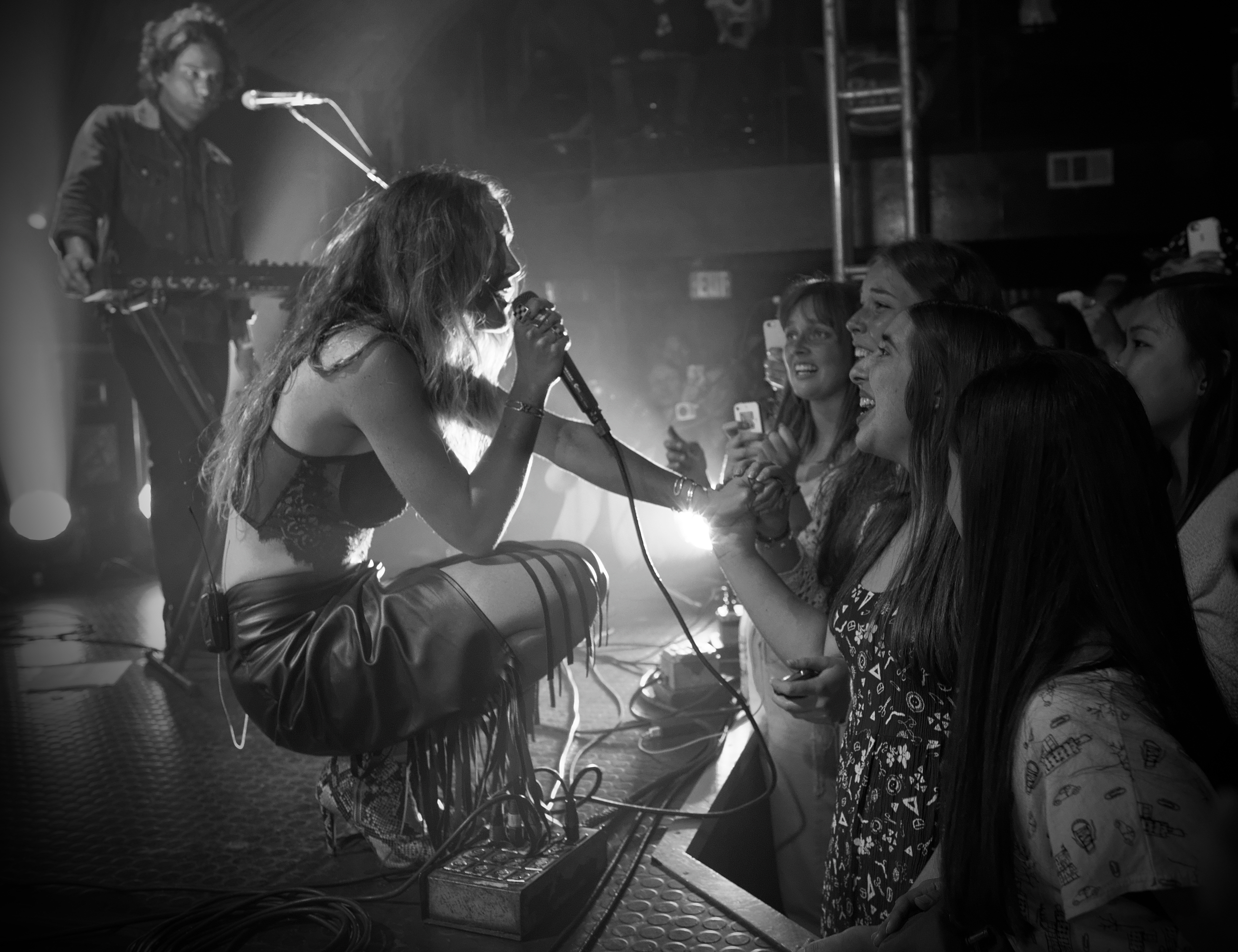
Day performing in West Hollywood in June 2015.

On February 27, 2015 Day announced her second studio album, Kicker. The video was directed by Gianennio Salucci and now boasts over 8 million views on Vevo. In May 2015, Day debuted the single "High", and performed it live the following month on Conan as her television debut.

Kicker was released on June 2, 2015 via Pinetop Records and Hollywood Records. The album title references the old Arizona mining town where Day's parents married while exploring toxic relationships, breakups, broken homes, love and lust. Speaking about the album, she explained, "The music's spiritual resonance is clearly influenced by the Northern Arizona mountains that sheltered my creative energy from any outside implications of city mentality." The record was hailed as Day's most intimate yet gorgeously expansive album yet and charted at number 65 on the US Billboard 200 and number 7 on the US Top Alternative. Interview Magazine praised Day's uniquely "own charmed style", and BlackBook Magazine declared, "it's safe to say this girl's on her way to being a household name."

On December 17, 2015 Day performed on Last Call with Carson Daly. On January 4, 2016 she performed "Hypnotic" on Late Night with Seth Meyers. Her third national TV appearance was followed by a number of high-profile festival performances at Billboard Hot 100 Fest, Music Midtown, and the iHeart Radio Music Festival. Her debut at Coachella in 2016 caught the attention of Los Angeles Magazine, which described the performance as "hypnotic"; Billboard, which hailed her set as "stellar"; and Consequence of Sound, which exclaimed, "it's entirely possible that Zella Day looks back on Coachella 2016 as the moment that launched her career in the earnest... Day is an undeniably powerful vocalist."

=== 2016–2018: Departure from Hollywood Records ===
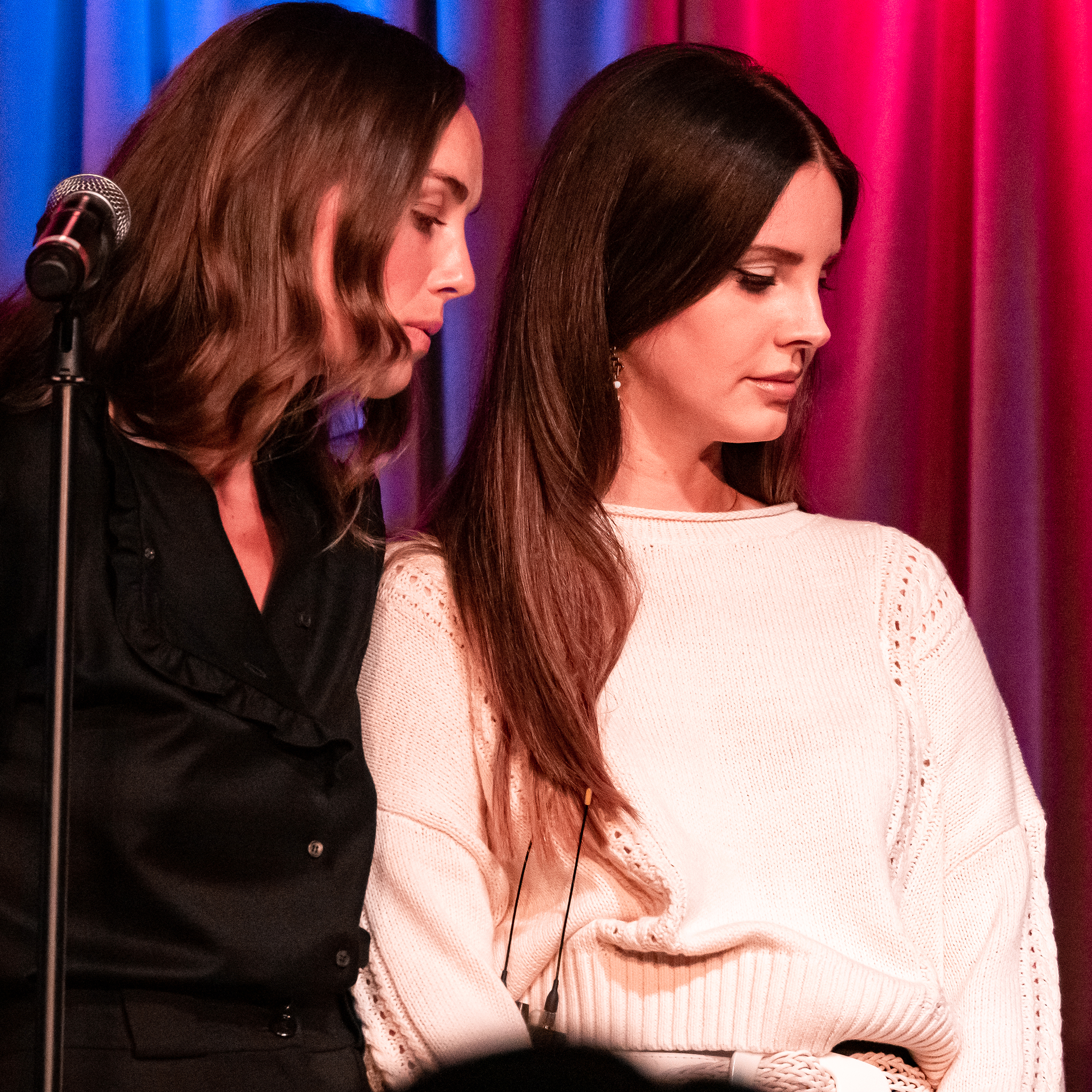
Day performing with Lana Del Rey in October 2019.

On May 4, 2016, Day was featured again as a musical guest on Last Call with Carson Daly, debuting her newest single, "Mustang Kids", live. As the latest single ahead of a headlining tour in June, "Mustang Kids" was officially released on June 9, 2016 featuring a guest verse from Florida-bred rapper Baby E. and a music video directed by Tim Mattia. Following the North American headlining tour in June 2016, Day embarked on a supporting run with L.A. neo-soul outfit Fitz and the Tantrums throughout July and then another supporting slot with Michael Franti and Spearhead in August.

In October 2016, Day released the single "Man on the Moon" and announced a 7" release via B3Sci. November 2016 saw the digital premier of "Hunnie Pie" as a B-side to the "Man on the Moon" 7". On November 29, 2018, Day uploaded a letter to her social media accounts explaining she had been released from her label and production deal. On December 14, she uploaded a video announcement alongside a new song titled "I Don't Know How To End" to her website. Day appeared as a guest on Lana Del Rey's LA to the Moon Tour in 2018.

=== 2019–2022: Where Does the Devil Hide and Sunday in Heaven ===
Day performed a cover of "For Free" alongside Weyes Blood with Lana Del Rey for her The Norman Fucking Rockwell! Tour show at The Hollywood Bowl on October 10, 2019. The trio later performed the song at the Grammy Museum in Los Angeles and released a studio version on Lana's Chemtrails over the Country Club album.

On October 25, she released a cover of "You Sexy Thing". After signing a deal with Easy Eye Sound and Concord Records, Day released the singles "People Are Strangers" in April and "My Game" in May, alongside accompanying music videos. On April 27, she announced an EP titled Where Does the Devil Hide. The announcement was followed by the releases of "Purple Haze" and "Only a Dream" in July.

On October 14, 2022, she released her third album, Sunday in Heaven.

=== 2023–present: Chaparelle ===
In 2023, Day moved from California to Texas and formed the country music group Chaparelle with singer-songwriter and romantic partner Jesse Woods as well as producer Beau Bedford, performing a number of live shows together throughout late 2023 and early 2024. They released their debut single "Bleeding Hearts" on June 28, 2024. Their debut album, Western Pleasure, was released on April 18, 2025.

== Personal life ==
On August 24, 2024, Day got engaged to singer-songwriter Jesse Woods. The two married on April 11, 2026, with fellow Chaparelle bandmate Beau Bedford serving as their wedding officiant.

== Discography ==
- Powered by Love (2009)
- Kicker (2015)
- Sunday in Heaven (2022)

== Tours ==
Headlining

- Zella Day on Tour (2015)
- Hot Summer Dreams Tour (2023)

Co-headlining

- Chaparelle on Tour (2023-24)

Supporting

- Fitz and the Tantrums - Get Right Back Summer Tour (2016)
- Miike Snow (2016)
- Silversun Pickups - Live in Concert (2021)
- Lana Del Rey - 2023–2024 tour (2023)

Promotional

- Zella Day Live in China (2023)
- China Tour (2024)
- LATAM Tour (2024)

Guest

- Michael Franti & Spearhead – Soulrocker Tour (2016)
- Seekae – Future Classic Tour (2017)
- Lana Del Rey – LA to the Moon Tour (2018)
- Lana Del Rey – The Norman Fucking Rockwell! Tour (2019)

== Filmography ==
=== Web ===
Year	Film	Role	Notes
2014–2015	DayxDay	Herself	Main role; 6 episodes

=== Music video ===
Year	Film	Artist	Role
2020	"Let Me Love You Like a Woman"	Lana Del Rey	Herself
