= Wax Ltd =

American songwriting and production duo

WAX LTD.
- Wally Gagel and Xandy Barry in the studio.

Background information
- Occupations: Record producer, songwriter, engineer
- Years active: 2005-Present

Wax Ltd. is the American multi-platinum production and songwriting duo of Wally Gagel and Xandy Barry. Collectively and individually they have worked with a wide variety of artists including Zella Day, Blondfire, Family of the Year, Miley Cyrus, Best Coast, Redlight King, Rihanna, Britney Spears, as well as Muse, The Rolling Stones, New Order, The Folk Implosion, Eels, and many others.

In January 2019, Gagel and Barry formed AUDIO WAX, a production music label signed exclusively to Killer Tracks, which is part of the Universal Music Group. It will be focusing on music for Film, TV and Brands. The first four LPs included Indie Alternative, Anthemic Rock, Motivational and Uplifting and Atmospheric that involved many of the artists who have recorded at WAX studios.

== History ==
Xandy Barry was in the New York based band Kilowatt and began his recording career at Green Street Studios and the Cutting Room before moving out to Los Angeles, CA. Wally Gagel was known for his work on the Top 40 hit "Natural One" by the band Folk Implosion as well as his involvement with Fort Apache Studios in Boston. He was also a member of the A&M recording act, Orbit. In 2005, after working together on Barry's solo album, All the Money in the World, the pair began writing, producing, recording and mixing for other artists under the name WAX LTD. In 2009, WAX LTD moved their operations into the former TTG Studios in Hollywood, CA, where a number of acts from the 1960s and 1970s recorded such as Jimi Hendrix, the Velvet Underground, the Doors, Neil Young, Frank Zappa and the Animals.

== Record label ==
In June 2011, Wax Ltd. formed WAX LTD. Records to sign as well as upstream artists on their roster. Notable releases include albums by Blondfire, Zella Day, Family of the Year and Redlight King.
