= Creeper discography =

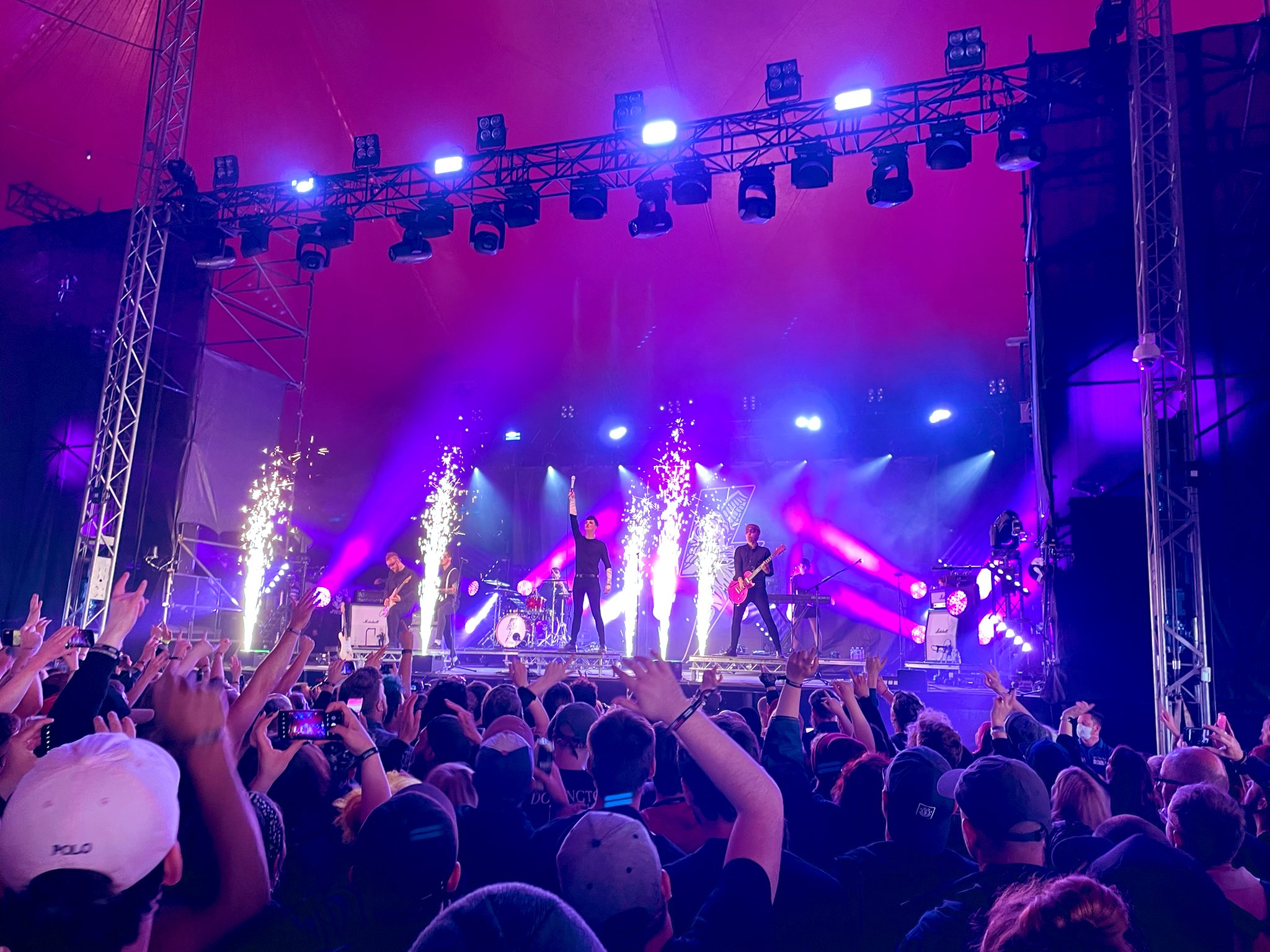
- Creeper performing live in June 2021
- Studio albums: 4
- EPs: 6
- Singles: 23
- Music videos: 28
- Other appearances: 3

The discography of Creeper, an English rock band, consists of four studio albums, six extended plays (EPs), 23 singles, 28 music videos and three other appearances. Formed in Southampton by vocalist Will Gould, guitarists Ian Miles and Sina Nemati, bassist Sean Scott and drummer Dan Bratton, Creeper independently released their self-titled debut EP in June 2014. After signing with Roadrunner Records, the band released their second EP The Callous Heart in September 2015.

After Nemati was replaced by Oliver Burdett and touring keyboardist and vocalist Hannah Greenwood was upgraded to a full-time member, Creeper released The Stranger in February 2016, which reached the top ten of the UK Rock & Metal Albums Chart. The group's debut album Eternity, in Your Arms followed in March 2017, which debuted at number 18 on the UK Albums Chart and topped the UK Rock & Metal Albums Chart. Christmas-themed EP Christmas was issued in December.

Following a year-long hiatus, Creeper issued the first single of their second era, "Born Cold", on 3 November 2019. Their second album, Sex, Death & the Infinite Void, followed in July 2020. The album debuted at number 5 on the UK Albums Chart and topped the UK Rock & Metal Albums Chart. A year later in July 2021, the group released a follow-up EP, American Noir, which reached number 13 on the UK Albums Chart and number 1 on the UK Rock & Metal Albums Chart.

Creeper signed with Spinefarm Records and in October 2023 released their third album Sanguivore, which reached number 29 on the UK Albums Chart and number 2 on the UK Rock & Metal Albums Chart. The album was followed by a sequel, Sanguivore II: Mistress of Death, on 31 October 2025.

== Studio albums ==
List of studio albums, with selected chart positions
Title	Album details	Peak chart positions							
Title	Album details	UK	UK Down.	UK Phys.	UK Rock	UK Sales	UK Rec.	UK Vinyl	SCO
Eternity, in Your Arms	Released: 24 March 2017; Label: Roadrunner; Formats: CD, LP, cassette, download	18	20	13	1	14	11	3	17
Sex, Death & the Infinite Void	Released: 31 July 2020; Label: Roadrunner; Formats: CD, LP, cassette, download	5	5	3	1	3	2	2	4
Sanguivore	Released: 13 October 2023; Label: Spinefarm; Formats: CD, LP, cassette, download	29	15	11	2	11	4	6	10
Sanguivore II: Mistress of Death	Released: 31 October 2025; Label: Spinefarm; Formats: CD, LP, cassette, download	43	15	11	2	12	10	7	14

== Extended plays ==
List of extended plays, with selected chart positions
Title	EP details	Peak chart positions							
Title	EP details	UK	UK Down.	UK Phys.	UK Rock	UK Sales	UK Rec.	UK Vinyl	SCO
Creeper	Released: 19 June 2014; Label: Palm Reader; Formats: download, 12" vinyl	—	—	33	3	33	2	5	33
The Callous Heart	Released: 18 September 2015; Label: Roadrunner; Formats: download, 12" vinyl	—	—	—	—	—	—	—	—
The Stranger	Released: 19 February 2016; Label: Roadrunner; Formats: download, 12" vinyl	130	59	—	9	84	—	7	—
Christmas	Released: 8 December 2017; Label: Roadrunner; Format: download	—	—	—	—	—	—	—	—
Sounds from the Void	Released: 14 May 2021; Label: Roadrunner; Format: download	—	—	—	—	—	—	—	—
American Noir	Released: 30 July 2021; Label: Roadrunner; Formats: CD, LP, cassette, download	13	18	4	1	3	4	3	5
"—" denotes a release that did not register on that chart.

== Singles ==
List of singles, showing year released and album/EP name
Title	Year	Album/EP
"Lie Awake"	2015	The Callous Heart
"The Honeymoon Suite"	2015	The Callous Heart
"Black Mass"	2016	The Stranger
"Suzanne"	2016	Eternity, in Your Arms
"Hiding with Boys"	2016	Eternity, in Your Arms
"Black Rain"	2017	Eternity, in Your Arms
"Misery"	2017	Eternity, in Your Arms
"Fairytale of New York"	2017	Christmas
"Born Cold"	2019	Sex, Death & the Infinite Void
"Annabelle"	2020	Sex, Death & the Infinite Void
"Cyanide"	2020	Sex, Death & the Infinite Void
"All My Friends"	2020	Sex, Death & the Infinite Void
"Be My End"	2020	Sex, Death & the Infinite Void
"Poisoned Heart"	2020	Sex, Death & the Infinite Void
"Midnight"	2021	American Noir
"America at Night"	2021	American Noir
"Ghost Brigade"	2022	non-album single
"Cry to Heaven"	2023	Sanguivore
"Teenage Sacrifice"	2023	Sanguivore
"Black Heaven"	2023	Sanguivore
"Headstones"	2025	Sanguivore II: Mistress of Death
"Blood Magick (It's a Ritual)"	2025	Sanguivore II: Mistress of Death
"Prey for the Night"	2025	Sanguivore II: Mistress of Death

== Music videos ==
List of music videos, showing year released, director(s) and album/EP name
Title	Year	Director(s)	Album/EP
"Gloom"	2014	Rolling Vision	Creeper
"VCR"	2015	Rolling Vision	Creeper
"Lie Awake"	2015	Creeper, Jamie Carter	The Callous Heart
"The Honeymoon Suite"	2015	Creeper, Jamie Carter	The Callous Heart
"Allergies"	2015	Martyna Wisniewska, Jamie Carter	The Callous Heart
"Black Mass"	2016	Jamie Carter	The Stranger
"Astral Projection"	2016	Jay Wennington, Jamie Carter	The Stranger
"Suzanne"	2016	Jamie Carter	Eternity, in Your Arms
"Hiding with Boys"	2016	Jamie Carter	Eternity, in Your Arms
"Black Rain"	2017	Jamie Carter	Eternity, in Your Arms
"Misery"	2017	Jamie Carter	Eternity, in Your Arms
"Misery" (single version)	2017	Jay Wennington	Eternity, in Your Arms
"Born Cold"	2019	Oscar Sansom	Sex, Death & the Infinite Void
"Cyanide"	2020	Oscar Sansom	Sex, Death & the Infinite Void
"All My Friends"	2020	Creeper	Sex, Death & the Infinite Void
"Be My End"	2020	Marco Pavone	Sex, Death & the Infinite Void
"Poisoned Heart"	2020	Oscar Sansom	Sex, Death & the Infinite Void
"Midnight"	2021	Olli Appleyard	American Noir
"Damned and Doomed"	2021	Olli Appleyard	American Noir
"Cry to Heaven"	2023	Billy H. Price, Jacek Zmarz	Sanguivore
"Teenage Sacrifice"	2023	Billy H. Price, Jacek Zmarz	Sanguivore
"Black Heaven"	2023	Billy H. Price, Jacek Zmarz	Sanguivore
"Further Than Forever"	2023	Billy H. Price, Jacek Zmarz	Sanguivore
"Lovers Led Astray"	2024	Harry Steel	Sanguivore
"Headstones"	2025	Harry Steel	Sanguivore II: Mistress of Death
"Blood Magick (It's a Ritual)"	2025	Harry Steel	Sanguivore II: Mistress of Death
"Prey for the Night"	2025	Harry Steel	Sanguivore II: Mistress of Death
"Parasite"	2026	Harry Steel	Sanguivore II: Mistress of Death

== Other appearances ==
List of other appearances, showing year released and album name
Title	Year	Album
"The Evil That Men Do" (Iron Maiden cover)	2016	Maiden Heaven Volume 2: An All-Star Tribute To Iron Maiden
"This Is How I Disappear" (My Chemical Romance cover)	2016	Rock Sound Presents: The Black Parade
"Welcome In" (with Static Dress)	2023	Rouge Carpet Disaster Redux, Volume 3
