= Misery (Creeper song) =

Single by Creeper

from the EP The Stranger and the album Eternity, in Your Arms
- Released: 9 June 2017
- Length: 3:48 (album version); 3:20 (single version)
- Label: Roadrunner
- Songwriter(s): Will Gould; Ian Miles
- Producer(s): Neil Kennedy

Creeper singles chronology
"Black Rain" (2017)	"Misery" (2017)	"Fairytale of New York" (2017)

"Misery" is a song by English rock band Creeper. Written by the group's lead vocalist Will Gould and guitarist and backing vocalist Ian Miles, it was produced by Neil Kennedy and featured on the band's 2016 third extended play (EP) The Stranger. A reworked version of the song was later featured on the band's full-length debut Eternity, in Your Arms and released as a music video, and a third mix of the track was issued as a single with a new video on 9 June 2017.

== Composition and lyrics ==
Creeper frontman Will Gould has revealed that "Misery" was "a very hard song to write and sing". Crediting American indie rock band The Sidekicks for their song "1940's Fighter Jet" as inspiration, the vocalist explained that he wrote the song with guitarist and backing vocalist Ian Miles by "play[ing] around a load and end[ing] up putting together a song that sounded nothing like the one that sparked the idea". Speaking about the lyrics in particular, Gould noted that "The lyrical content was some of the most upsetting to write for me. After it was complete though, I felt a release, almost a weight lifted". Stereoboard.com's Alec Chillingworth described "Misery" as "an anthem, a singalong arena filler and an ode to its namesake".

== Promotion and release ==
"Misery" was initially released on the band's third EP The Stranger on 19 February 2016. According to Remfry Dedman of The Independent, the song became "an instant favourite" among fans, with crowds at the band's live shows often singing back the track's refrain of "Misery never goes out of style" in a way that "was beginning to make them feel uncomfortable". Speaking about the phenomenon, Gould commented that "I was really concerned that our tag line was becoming 'misery never goes out of style' ... I felt like that wasn't the message I wanted to send out and have people take away with them." According to set list aggregation website Setlist.fm, as of 2022, "Misery" is the band's most-performed song at live shows.

The song was later reworked and featured on the band's debut full-length studio album Eternity, in Your Arms in March 2017, as "the only track to make it from [the band's] past through to their present". Speaking about their decision to release "Misery" again, Gould explained that it was done in order to extend the life of the song and allow the band to continue playing it live, due to the worry that "the EPs will get lost in time". The track's position on the album was chosen intentionally to act as the end of "side A" on a 12" vinyl. Consequently, the more positive "I Choose to Live" was placed as the final track on the album in an attempt to "project a hopeful message rather than something that was hopeless".

The music video for "Misery" was released on 30 March 2017, serving as the final part of a trilogy including "Hiding with Boys" and "Black Rain" which ties in with the story of Eternity, in Your Arms. Will Richards of DIY magazine explained that the video depicts James Scythe, the subject of the album's story, "wandering around the city, with some shots of frontman Will Gould pounding his chest in a car park, for good measure", describing it as "suitably dramatic". On 9 June 2017, a third version of the song was released as a single.

== Critical reception ==
Reviewing The Stranger for Stereoboard.com, Alec Chillingworth claimed that the last two songs on the EP "set the band apart from the pretenders", highlighting "Misery" in particular as "an affirmation of Creeper's individuality". Chillingworth specifically praised the chorus of the track, proposing that "It will surely be their calling card once they slide up festival bills and start playing to audiences more acquainted with their music. It's got one of those sun setting over the field, beer in hand, arm round your mates kind of choruses". Ticketmaster writer Jessica Bridgeman called the song "a standout track" from the EP, praising its "breathtaking" performance in a review of the band's live show at the Camden Underworld in March 2016.

Upon the release of Eternity, in Your Arms, "Misery" was praised by several critics. Rock Sound writer David McLaughlin claimed that the reworked track is "somehow capable of crushing hearts once more with its desolate, devastating melancholy", while Jessica Goodman of The Line of Best Fit praised it for being "still as stirring as the first time we heard it on ... The Stranger". Metal Hammer critic Rob Barbour suggested that "the inclusion of the year-old "Misery" in lieu of another original composition is an odd choice", although admitted that "it would be churlish to pretend [it doesn't] make sense in the context of the album, or in any way ruin[s] its masterful pacing".
