= Sanguivore (album) =

Studio album by Creeper
- Released: 13 October 2023
- Studios: Psalm Studios (Wiltshire, England), Rockfield Studios (Monmouthshire, Wales)
- Genres: Gothic rock, heavy metal
- Length: 42:06
- Label: Spinefarm
- Producer: Tom Dalgety

Creeper chronology
American Noir (2021)	Sanguivore (2023)	Sanguivore II: Mistress of Death (2025)

Singles from Sanguivore
- 1. "Cry to Heaven" Released: 26 May 2023; 2. "Teenage Sacrifice" Released: 10 August 2023; 3. "Black Heaven" Released: 21 September 2023; 4. "Further Than Forever" Released: 18 October 2023; 5. "Lovers Led Astray" Released: 6 March 2024

Sanguivore is the third studio album by English rock band Creeper. Produced by Tom Dalgety, it was released on 13 October 2023 as the group's first album on Spinefarm Records. The album's release was preceded by the singles "Cry to Heaven" on 26 May, "Teenage Sacrifice" on 10 August and "Black Heaven" on 21 September.

== Background ==
The concept for an album based around vampires was inspired by the end of the COVID-19 lockdown in the United Kingdom and the return of live music. Gould explained in an interview with Rolling Stone that both are about "breathing new life into an old body and falling back in love". He also stated this sentiment was echoed in the revival of a number of aspects of the band that had not been present since the Eternity, in Your Arms cycle, such as jackets with matching back patches and songs about friendship. In an interview with Kerrang! just after the album's announcement, Gould explained that "We'd always planned to do a vampire record. We'd been thinking about it for a couple of years and knew that now was a good place to go after where the last one left off. We wanted to make something darker than we'd ever made before."

When the band began working with producer Tom Dalgety, the first song they brought to him was "Ghost Brigade", which had been written just after the release of Eternity in Your Arms in the same writing session as "Born Cold". The band used the track as a way of testing their chemistry with Dalgety. Album opener "Further Than Forever" had been partially written and demoed by Gould as a piano led song, with a number of different verses and choruses, for years prior to recording the album. After some time, Miles introduced its pedal note introduction and eventually the song was brought to Dalgety who had his own incomplete progressive rock segment influenced by "Easy Lover". As a collective, they merged these sections, and wrote the remaining song. Then final part of the song to be written was its chorus, which was influenced by Bruce Springsteen.

When first writing the album, Creeper intended for the album to be titled European Vampires: A True Story, however became disheartened by this title following Brexit.

A special edition of the album, featuring two unreleased songs, a remix of lead single "Cry To Heaven", and a cover of Shadows of the Night, made famous by musician Pat Benatar was released to streaming services on 26 April 2024.

== Promotion and release ==
The finale of the album cycle for Creeper's previous album, Sex, Death & the Infinite Void, took place at the Roundhouse in London on 4 November 2022. During this performance, Gould was beheaded as a representation of the end of the previous album's cycle and the beginning of the subsequent album cycle, announcing they had signed to Spinefarm Records. As this happened, the band's merchandise table swapped to selling merchandise for the new album, which included a free cassette tape of the then unreleased track "Ghost Brigade", of which 666 numbered copies were made. This news was announced on social media the following day once "Ghost Brigade" was released on streaming services. The promotional posts on social media for this single was the introduction of a character named Darcia, a vampire familiar. Darcia would go on to feature in much of the album's promotion material.

After almost seven months without further news regarding new material, "Cry to Heaven" was released and Sanguivore announced on 26 May 2023. That night, the band performed at the Heavy Music Awards at Wembley Arena, playing both new tracks live for the first time. On 10 August, they released the album's second single "Teenage Sacrifice".

Creeper promoted Sanguivore on the Sacred Blasphemy Tour, consisting of five UK shows, between 5 and 10 November 2023. They continued touring throughout 2024. At a special show on 31 May 2025, the band announced a sequel to the album, Sanguivore II: Mistress of Death, that will be released on 31 October 2025.

== Composition and lyrics ==
The albums follows the love story of characters Mercy, a violent vampire who was turned at the age of 19, and Spook an old man whom she has control over. Opener "Further Than Forever" tells the story of Spook being turned into a vampire, with "Cry to Heaven" following Mercy on her ensuing murderous rampage. As the album continues, Mercy regains much of her humanity.

Critics have categorised Sanguivore as gothic rock and heavy metal. The song "Sacred Blasphemy" merges "emo sensibilities... with rock'n'roll glitz", while "Lovers Led Astray" is synth rock and "Black Heaven" is dark wave.

The band have cited the Sisters of Mercy, Danzig, the Damned, the Cult, Jim Steinman's Bad for Good, Orchestral Manoeuvres in the Dark, Celine Dion, the Misfits, Meat Loaf, Nick Cave, Bonnie Tyler, Gary Numan and Depeche Mode as influences on the album. In particular, "Sacred Blasphemy" was influenced by the Misfits, "Teenage Sacrifice" by tradition heavy metal, "The Ballad of Spook & Mercy" by Nick Cave and "Further Than Forever" by Bonnie Tyler and Meat Loaf's "Bat Out of Hell". Many of the guitar riffs included on the album were influenced by Metallica.

== Critical reception ==
Professional ratings
Aggregate scores
Source	Rating
Metacritic	89/100
Review scores
Source	Rating
Beats Per Minute	72%
Clash	9/10
Classic Rock	3.5/5 stars
DIY	4.5/5 stars
Dork	5/5 stars
The Line of Best Fit	9/10
Kerrang!	5/5
Metal Hammer	4.5/5 stars
New Noise Magazine	5/5 stars
The Skinny	4/5 stars

Sanguivore received critical acclaim. On review aggregator website Metacritic, the album holds a score of 89 out of 100, based on reviews from seven critics, which indicates "universal acclaim".

== Track listing ==
All tracks are written by Will Gould, Ian Miles and Tom Dalgety.

Sanguivore track listing
No.	Title	Length
1.	"Further Than Forever"	9:12
2.	"Cry to Heaven"	4:27
3.	"Sacred Blasphemy"	2:53
4.	"The Ballad of Spook & Mercy"	4:39
5.	"Lovers Led Astray"	4:40
6.	"Teenage Sacrifice"	4:17
7.	"Chapel Gates"	2:23
8.	"The Abyss"	0:42
9.	"Black Heaven"	4:15
10.	"More Than Death"	4:38
Total length:		42:06

Special edition bonus tracks
No.	Title	Writer(s)	Length
11.	"Shadows of the Night" (Pat Benatar Cover)	David Leigh Byron, Rachel Sweet	4:03
12.	"Love And Pain"		4:13
13.	"Phantom Fantasia"		3:07
14.	"Cry to Heaven - Count Dalgula's Queen Of The Night Extended Mix"		5:27
Total length:			58:56

== Personnel ==
Creeper

- Will Gould – lead vocals
- Ian Miles – guitars
- Hannah Greenwood – keyboards, backing vocals
- Sean Scott – bass
- Jake Fogarty – drums

Additional personnel

- Jack Boston – backing vocals
- Joanna Nye – backing vocals
- Daan Temmink – grand piano (tracks 1 and 10)
- Tom Dalgety – production, mixing, keyboards, synthesizers, guitar, spoken word on "Further Than Forever"
- Robin Schmidt – mastering
- Welder Wings – artwork
- Dan Capp – layout
- Andy Ford – photography

== Charts ==
Chart performance for Sanguivore
Chart (2023)	Peak position
Scottish Albums (Official Charts)	10
UK Albums (Official Charts)	29
