= Born Cold =

Single by Creeper

from the album Sex, Death & the Infinite Void
- Released: 3 November 2019
- Studio: Wax Ltd Studios (Hollywood, California)
- Length: 2:57
- Label: Roadrunner
- Songwriter(s): Will Gould; Ian Miles; Neil Kennedy
- Producer(s): Xandy Barry

Creeper singles chronology
"Fairytale of New York" (2017)	"Born Cold" (2019)	"Annabelle" (2020)

"Born Cold" is a song by English rock band Creeper. Written by the band's lead vocalist Will Gould, lead guitarist Ian Miles and record producer Neil Kennedy, it was recorded at Wax Ltd Studios in Hollywood, California and produced by Xandy Barry. The song is the third track on the band's second studio album Sex, Death & the Infinite Void and was released as the first single from the album on 3 November 2019.

== Composition and lyrics ==
Creeper frontman Will Gould and lead guitarist Ian Miles wrote "Born Cold" as the first song for their second album, co-writing with record producer Neil Kennedy, with whom they had previously worked on their first three EPs and their debut album Eternity, in Your Arms. The song was described by Gould as "the introduction of one of the more villainous characters from our new story," adding that "It was inspired by what the Thin White Duke was for David Bowie – a more selfish, narcissistic character." The vocalist added that the song serves as "the perfect transition" between the band's first and second albums.

== Promotion and release ==
Creeper debuted "Born Cold" at their first show in a year on 1 November 2019; the recorded version was premiered on the BBC Radio 1 Rock Show two days later, before it was released on digital download and online streaming services. The song is set to be featured as the opening track on the band's second album.

== Critical reception ==
In a review of Creeper's return show, DIY writer Ben Tipple described "Born Cold" as an "emo banger" and claimed that "Its huge chorus is perhaps the best melody the group have crafted to date, sitting among the hook laden 'Hiding with Boys' and the defining 'Black Rain'." Laura Johnson of Stereoboard.com praised the track's "grandiosity" and noted that it "sets the bar high for [the band's] next release".

== Personnel ==
Creeper

- Will Gould – lead vocals
- Ian Miles – guitar
- Oliver Burdett – guitar
- Sean Scott – bass
- Hannah Greenwood – keyboards, backing vocals
- Dan Bratton – drums

Production personnel

- Xandy Barry – production, engineering, bells
- Neil Kennedy – engineering, backing vocals
- Mark Crew – mixing
- Chris Gehringer – mastering
