= Salem (British punk band) =

British punk band

- Origin: Southampton, England
- Genres: Punk rock; horror punk; pop punk
- Years active: 2019–present
- Label: Roadrunner
- Spinoff of: Creeper
- Members: Will Gould; Matt Reynolds

Salem are a British punk rock band from Southampton. Formed in 2019, the group consists of vocalist Will Gould (of Creeper) and guitarist Matt Reynolds (of Howards Alias, Skylar and Drawings). For live performances, the core duo are joined by bassist Ranny Ransom and drummer Aaron Graham. Initially conceived as a side project in the summer of 2019, Gould, Reynolds and Graham recorded five songs which they did not originally intend to release. However, when the COVID-19 pandemic meant that Creeper were unable to tour, the tracks were released as Salem's self-titled debut EP in 2020. A second five-track EP, Salem II, followed in 2021.

== History ==
=== 2019–2020: Formation and first EP ===
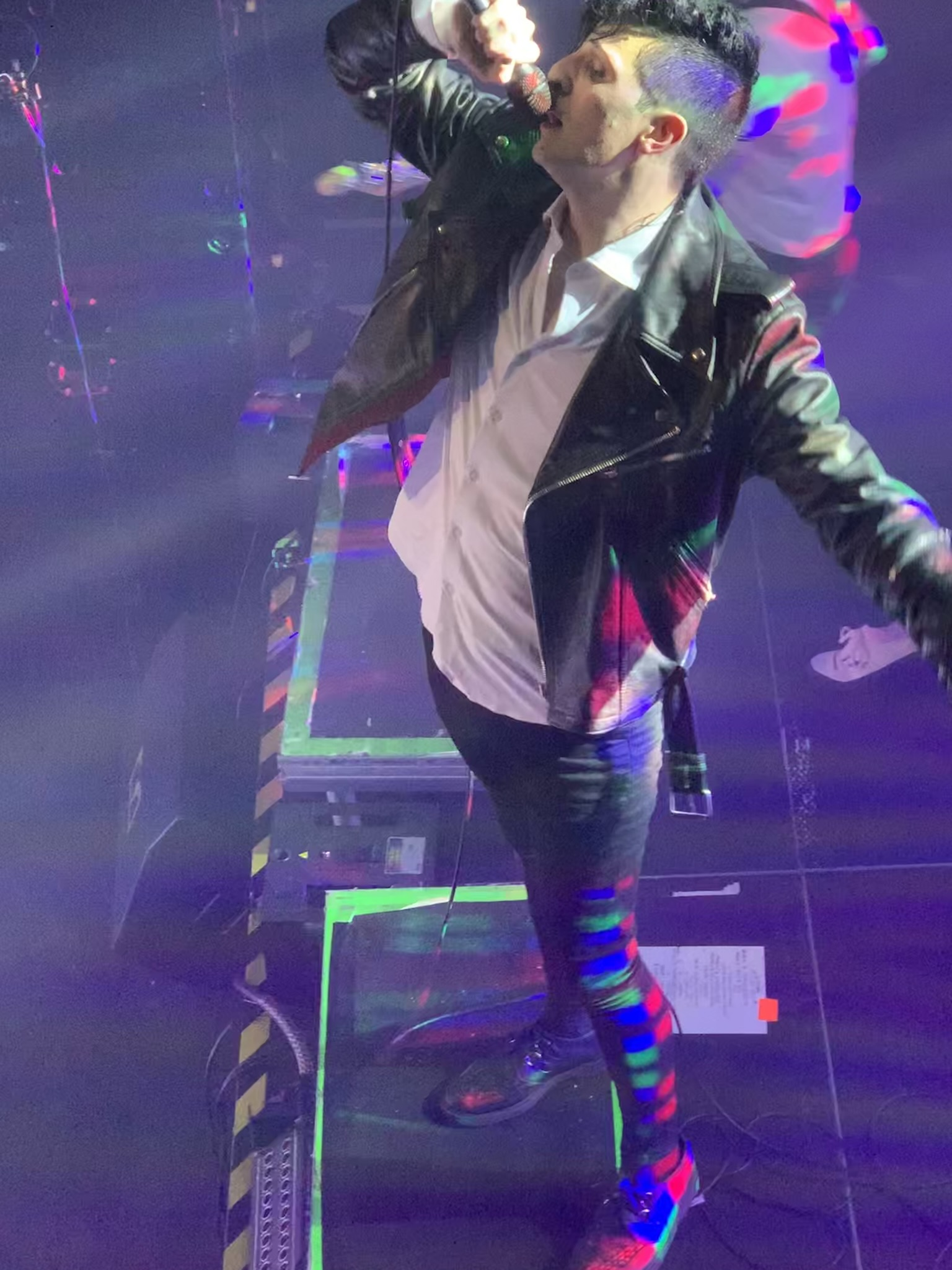
Will Gould formed Salem during the recording of Creeper's second album Sex, Death & the Infinite Void in 2019.

Will Gould and Matt Reynolds had worked together for several years before forming Salem, including writing together for the first two Creeper albums and Reynolds working as a guitar tech for the band. During the recording of Creeper's second album Sex, Death & the Infinite Void in 2019, the pair decided to spend a day writing and recording together, as a way for Gould to "blow off some steam" from the complex narrative-based songwriting of his main band. Shortly thereafter, the pair recorded the five songs at the Ranch Production House with Drawings drummer Aaron Graham and producer Neil Kennedy. The tracks were not initially intended to be released, however due to the impact of the COVID-19 pandemic on the music industry, Creeper were forced to postpone touring in promotion of their second album, and in September 2020 the band were unveiled. Speaking about their decision to launch Salem during pandemic-related restrictions, Gould explained that "We're releasing when a lot of kids are stuck inside, or if they're not, their life isn't quite the same. It's a way to soundtrack this very difficult time. The power of punk rock is that it helps you forget about the monotony of every day. And life has never been as monotonous as it is now."

Salem released their debut single "Destroy Me" on the day the band were officially announced, 28 September 2020. Gould described the song as "a really good introduction that summarises the band ... [with] the right kind of energy from the offset." The song's accompanying music video features Gould's girlfriend Charlotte Clutterbuck. The single was followed on 23 October by the group's self-titled debut EP, released on Roadrunner Records. In an interview with The Line of Best Fit, Gould explained that most of the songs on the EP were inspired by his relationship with Clutterbuck, commenting: "This record is about my life but everything is multiplied by a million. It's an exaggeration of real life ... These songs are about our relationship, about being loved." Salem received positive reviews from a range of music critics – Kerrang! writer Nick Ruskell rated the EP four out of five, calling it "irresistible" and describing the band as "an energetic, charismatic escape into a world that seems far more promising and exciting than the real one". Similarly, Sarah Jamieson of DIY magazine called Salem "a welcome dalliance with the punk rock bands that so inform Will's day job".

The week after releasing their debut EP, Salem played their first two shows – dubbed "the Halloween Cabaret" – at London's New Cross Inn and Southampton's 1865 on 30 and 31 October 2020, respectively. This was followed on 1 December by a performance at Blondies, a "tiny dive bar" in London, for the Kerrang! K! Pit series of socially-distanced shows with no audience. As well as the five songs from Salem, the band also played three new tracks, "William, It Was Really Something", "Sweet Tooth" and "Heaven Help Me". A music video for "Throat" was released on 10 December, the story of which was inspired by the novel Misery by Stephen King.

=== 2020–present: Second EP and touring ===
A second Salem EP was first announced in December 2020, when Gould revealed that the band had recently recorded the collection at Middle Farm Studios with producer Peter Miles. On 12 April 2021, "Draculads" was released as the first song from the new EP Salem II, which was scheduled for release on 7 May. Speaking about the new track, Gould noted that "'Draculads' is the sound of two lovers kissing in a bar fight. It is an over the top love song literally about falling in love with a vampire." Salem II was similarly well-received as Salem, with Nick Ruskell for Kerrang! writing that "II is, like October's self-titled debut EP, a goth-punk rush that has its black heart firmly in the same place as AFI, early My Chemical Romance and Grave Pleasures". DIY writer Ben Tipple dubbed the EP "cinematic and playful".

Salem embarked on their first full concert tour, the Join the Church Tour, in October 2021, playing 19 shows at small venues across the UK supported by James and the Cold Gun, culminating with a final date at Southampton's Joiners Arms on Halloween night. In January 2022, a new version of Salem opening track "Fall Out of Love" featuring additional vocals by Carlie Hanson was featured during the closing credits of the film Scream and released as a single. Speaking about the feature, Gould commented that "As big fans of the franchise it has been surreal to be asked to be a part of its legacy in some small way. We couldn't ask to be featured on a more perfect soundtrack." A second run of UK headline shows, the Unholy Communion Tour with support act Bad Nerves, followed in April. During the summer, Salem performed their first festival shows at Download Festival in June, 2000trees in July, and Burn It Down in Torquay in September.

== Members ==
Official members

- Will Gould – lead vocals (2019–present)
- Matt Reynolds – guitar, bass, keyboards, backing vocals (2019–present)

Backup members

- Aaron Graham – drums (2019–present; session and touring)
- Ranny Ransom – bass (2020–present; touring only)

== Discography ==
Extended plays

- Salem (2020)
- Salem II (2021)

Singles

- "Destroy Me" (2020)
- "Draculads" (2021)
- "Fall Out of Love" (feat. Carlie Hanson) (2022)
