= Invasions of the Mind =

Studio album by Energy
- Released: September 30, 2008
- Recorded: June 2008
- Studio: Webster Lake Studios in Webster, MA
- Genre: Punk rock, Hardcore punk
- Length: 27:39
- Label: Bridge 9 Records
- Producer: Chris Curran, Mike Rendini

Energy chronology
Race The Sun (2008)	Invasions of the Mind (2008)	Walk Into The Fire (2010)

Professional ratings
Review scores
Source	Rating
AllMusic	3.5/5 stars
Kill Your Stereo	90%
Punknews	2/5 stars
Punk Rock Theory	7.5/10 stars
Scene Point Blank	4.5/10

Invasions of the Mind is the debut studio album by American punk rock band Energy. It was released on September 30, 2008, through Bridge 9 Records.

== Release and reception ==
Invasions of the Mind is the band Energy's first full-length studio album. It was released through Bridge 9 Records on September 30, 2008. It comes after the release of their 2006 EP Punch The Clock. The album was received with mixed reviews, being compared to early AFI, Ignite and The Misfits.

In an AllMusic review, Greg Prato gives a positive take on the album, saying "There was a time when hardcore music was played solely by (and to) a bunch of shirtless and bald tough guys. But over the years, more mainstream sounds and approaches have infiltrated the style – to the point that "hardcore metal" groups have actually scored honest to goodness hit albums on the Billboard charts (which back in the '80s, would have seemed like a pipe dream). A good example of this aforementioned style would definitely be the Boston-based quintet, Energy, and their 2008 release, Invasions of the Mind. The speedy tempos and sometimes shouted vocals definitely point in the direction of hardcore. However, their almost Beach Boys-y harmonies, appreciation for penning a pop hook, and a sticky sweet production separate them from bands that specialize in nothing but good old-fashioned hardcore—especially as evidenced on such tracks as "Hunter Red" and "Heaven." While you wouldn't go quite as far as calling Energy "a hardcore boy band," the group's leanings toward the mainstream are undeniable throughout Invasions of the Mind".

Whereas, others would say the album fell short of the bands previously acclaimed EP Punch The Clock, calling the album mediocre with weak, overproduced, generic vocals.

== Track listing ==
No.	Title	Length
1.	"Invasions"	1:40
2.	"Hunter Red"	2:57
3.	"The Silence"	2:35
4.	"Heaven"	0:28
5.	"400"	3:56
6.	"Contact"	2:23
7.	"Hail the Size of Grapes"	2:45
8.	"2 Whole Minutes Under Water"	2:02
9.	"Satellite and the Hit"	3:26
10.	"Revelations"	2:08
11.	"Brickstone"	3:14
Total length:		27:39

== Personnel ==
- Jason Tankerley – vocals
- Joe Freedman – guitar
- Dan Mancini – guitar, back up vocals
- Conor O'Brien – bass
- Justin Flaherty – drums
- Mike Rendini – keyboards
- Bill Hauser – artwork
- Jay Maas – mixed
- Chris Curran – engineering, additional mixing, back up vocals
- Nick Zampiello – mastered
- Dan O' Connor – back up vocals
