= Eternity, in Your Arms =

Studio album by Creeper
- Released: 24 March 2017
- Recorded: 2015–2016
- Studio: The Ranch Production House (Southampton, England)
- Genre: Horror punk; punk rock; gothic rock; emo
- Length: 36:14
- Label: Roadrunner
- Producer: Neil Kennedy

Creeper chronology
The Stranger (2016)	Eternity, in Your Arms (2017)	Christmas (2017)

Singles from Eternity, in Your Arms
- 1. "Suzanne" Released: 3 October 2016; 2. "Hiding with Boys" Released: 12 December 2016; 3. "Black Rain" Released: 15 February 2017; 4. "Misery" Released: 9 June 2017

Eternity, in Your Arms is the debut studio album by English rock band Creeper. Released on 24 March 2017 by Roadrunner Records, it was produced by Neil Kennedy at The Ranch Production House in the band's hometown of Southampton, where the band had previously recorded their first three extended plays (EPs) – 2014's Creeper, 2015's The Callous Heart and 2016's The Stranger – also with Kennedy. The album is primarily categorised as horror punk, although it has also been described by critics as incorporating elements of pop punk, glam rock and post-hardcore into both its lyrical content and musical styles.

Loosely categorised as a concept album by commentators, Eternity, in Your Arms is centred around the story of James Scythe, a fictional missing paranormal investigator. The story is inspired by characters in J. M. Barrie's Peter Pan and is a continuation of a narrative started on The Callous Heart and The Stranger which features references to various Creeper songs and lyrics. "Suzanne", "Hiding with Boys" and "Black Rain" were released as singles prior to the album's release, followed later by "Misery" . The music videos for "Hiding with Boys", "Black Rain" and "Misery" also serve as a trilogy which ties in with the storyline of James Scythe.

Eternity, in Your Arms debuted at number 18 on the UK Albums Chart, number 20 on the UK Album Downloads Chart and number 1 on the UK Rock & Metal Albums Chart. The album was a critical success, with writers praising the development of Creeper's sound since their first three EPs. Some reviews suggested that the musical style of the release was somewhat derivative or unoriginal, but nonetheless hailed the "catchy" nature and interesting lyrical content of many of the songs. Following its release, the album was promoted on a headline tour of the UK and Europe until mid-April, followed by festival dates in Europe and the US.

== Promotion and release ==
Creeper's debut full-length album Eternity, in Your Arms was officially announced on 2 October 2016, when the band resurfaced after an absence of just over a month during which they "wiped their social media presence, appeared to be 'kidnapped', [and] started a whole load of weird, confusing phone calls from their hometown of Southampton" as part of a publicity stunt. As part of the announcement, the band also released "Suzanne" as the first single and music video from the upcoming album, the chorus of which features the phrase "We'll die holding hands", which had been shared a number of times on the group's social media during the previous month.

"Hiding with Boys" was premiered as the second song from Eternity, in Your Arms on the BBC Radio 1 Rock Show on 11 December 2016, followed by its single release the following day. The music video for the song, directed by Jamie Carter, serves as the first part of a trilogy related to the story of the album's main subject James Scythe. "Black Rain" was issued as the third single from the album on 14 February 2017, after debuting as MistaJam's "Hottest Record" on BBC Radio 1. Gould and keyboardist Hannah Greenwood described the track as "a bitter love song" on the radio show, while the former also hailed it "a progression" from the previously released songs and highlighted it as "one of [the band's] favourites" from the album. The song featured as the second part of the James Scythe trilogy, which was later completed by "Misery" on 30 March. A slightly reworked version of "Misery" was released as a single on 9 June.

Creeper promoted Eternity, in Your Arms on a headline tour of the UK and Europe which began in Manchester the day after the album's release. Supported by Milk Teeth, Puppy and Energy on the UK dates, the tour also visited venues in Germany, Denmark, Norway, Sweden, Austria and France, before finishing with a show in the Netherlands on 15 April 2017. The band continued promoting the album live throughout 2017, including their first appearance on the main stage of Download Festival on 10 June and all dates of the 2017 Warped Tour in the US and Canada between June and August. In June they announced another headline UK tour for the end of the year, The Theatre of Fear, which was described in its announcement as "a one-of-a-kind production being brought to six theatres across the country".

== Composition ==
=== Musical style ===
Stylistically, Eternity, in Your Arms is described by AllMusic's James Christopher Monger in his review of the album as a mix between glam rock, post-hardcore and horror punk, with comparisons drawn to the work of bands including Alkaline Trio, The Damned, Misfits and AFI. NME writer Anita Bhagwandas also notes elements of pop punk on the album, especially on lead single "Suzanne", as well as making comparisons to Tiger Army and The Cure. Clash writer Dannii Leiver also highlighted elements of pop punk on "Suzanne" and "Poison Pens", as well as "nu-emo" on "Hiding with Boys" and "acoustic country" in the latter stages of the album. Vice magazine wrote that the "ornate punk" album was an "escapist's paradise" harking back to early emo. David McLaughlin of Rock Sound described Eternity, in Your Arms as "a punk rock record given to dramatic flourishes and rooted in an almost graphic novel-like world of fantasy, horror and romance", again naming Misfits, Meat Loaf and Alkaline Trio as influences on the album's sound. Blabbermouth.net's Ray Van Horn, Jr. categorised it as a mix of "goth and punk rock".

During the writing of the album, the band made an effort to implement more dramatic and theatrical elements into the music. Speaking to the NME, Gould commented that "We noticed UK punk-rock was becoming more straightforward [...] The spectacular, bombastic element was being stripped away. We wanted to re-attach that magic and look back to a time where things were more exciting." Identifying artists such as David Bowie and Metallica as influences, he continued that "We want to put that over-the-top flamboyance back into punk". Monger claims that the album demonstrates "a keen sense for the pageantry of rock & roll" and features "Meat Loaf-worthy grandeur", which he highlights as a unique quality of the record. Similarly, Bhagwandas described the release as "theatrical" and "grandiose", while Jessica Goodman of The Line of Best Fit commented that the album continues the tradition of "rock and roll at its most theatrical" that the band had shown on previous releases, praising its "sense of spectacle".

=== Lyrical content ===
Eternity, in Your Arms deals with a number of themes, including "anger, confusion, desire, escape, [and] heartache". Speaking about the album at the time of its announcement, Gould explained that "Eternity, in Your Arms is a record, this time not only about being young and heartbroken, but about transition, about age and loss. Not only the loss of life, but the loss of ourselves. The pieces of the people we were." Later asked about "Hiding with Boys", the vocalist proposed that "It's a bridge of sorts from the band we were on the EPs to the band that we are now", also noting that "It's a song of unrequited love told from the perspective of a 'tragic monster’' and is a lyrical sequel of sorts to the track "Black Mass"." The Line of Best Fit columnist Goodman summarised the album as "A desperate cry against growing up settling for routine".

Some commentators have described Eternity, in Your Arms as a concept album. The narrative told through the lyrics on the album is based on the story of Peter Pan, a character created by J. M. Barrie. Speaking to HMV, Gould explained that when approaching the writing of the album, he "went back and read the J. M. Barrie story and found real parallels with my life". When asked about this, he elaborated that "I've spent most of [my life] on tour, avoiding the real world and any responsibilities, for that reason I've got a very minimal education". After basing the titular characters of 2015's The Callous Heart and 2016's The Stranger on the Lost Boys and Tick-Tock the Crocodile, respectively, Eternity, in Your Arms follows a character inspired by Captain Hook known as James Scythe, a paranormal investigator who has gone missing. This was the basis of the campaign which led to the announcement of the album in October 2016.

In December of 2015, UK police filed a missing persons report for a 39 year old man named James Scythe. James had last been seen in the city of Southampton, he'd been staying at a local hotel named The Dolphin in room 309. Police were originally called when Mr Scythe's stay had ended without him checking out and after hotel staff entered his room. What officers found in the room would set the internet alight with speculation and made this story into one of the biggest internet mysteries of last year.

— Excerpt from WhereIsJamesScythe.co.uk

The concept element of Eternity, in Your Arms is inspired largely by David Bowie's 1972 album The Rise and Fall of Ziggy Stardust and the Spiders from Mars, which Gould hailed as "a really important record", as well as the music of My Chemical Romance and various films and television shows. Remfry Dedman of The Independent explained that "The narrative thread that weaves its way through The Callous Heart, The Stranger and concludes with Eternity, in Your Arms is aimed directly at a sub-culture who often grow up feeling isolated from those around them", describing it as a story based on the idea of "the desire to escape, if only for a short while, and leave all your troubles behind". The story is documented in the album's lyrics, the trilogy of music videos, and a dedicated podcast called The Spectral Sceptic.

== Reception ==
Professional ratings
Aggregate scores
Source	Rating
Metacritic	89/100
Review scores
Source	Rating
AllMusic	4/5 stars
Alternative Press	4.5/5 stars
Clash	8/10
Kerrang!	5/5 stars
The Line of Best Fit	8/10
Metal Hammer	4/5 stars
NME	4/5 stars
Q	4/5 stars
Rock Sound	8/10
The Times	4/5 stars

=== Critical response ===
Eternity, in Your Arms received widespread acclaim from music critics. Aggregating website Metacritic reports a normalised rating of 89 based on eight critical reviews, indicating "universal acclaim" for the release. AllMusic's James Christopher Monger awarded the album four out of five stars and stated that "With Eternity, in Your Arms, Creeper have truly proven themselves masters of the dark arts, as they've managed to create something as genuinely inspired as it is stylistically derivative". Reviewing the album for Rock Sound, David McLaughlin described it as "a punk rock record given to dramatic flourishes and rooted in an almost graphic novel-like world of fantasy, horror and romance", and claimed that "the songs soar in unison with the band's grand vision". McLaughlin praised the band's "admirable, fearless creativity" on the record, as well as highlighting the performances of keyboardist and backing vocalist Hannah Greenwood, who he claims "almost steals the show" on the album. Writing for Clash, Dannii Leivers hailed Eternity, in Your Arms as "a complete triumph", claiming that the band's "sound has truly flourished, grown wings and soared into velvet skies".

Metal Hammer writer Rob Barbour claimed that "While it's certainly no genrebusting reinvention, this record is still a stunning achievement, packed from start to finish with kaiju-sized choruses and without a single note out of place". Barbour highlighted "Room 309" as the collection's "defining moment" and "also its most unexpected", and concluded by describing the release as "masterful". Q magazine also praised the release, claiming that "The switches from retro punk to camp stadium rock are seamless, and Creeper prove themselves worthy heirs to the bombastic rock bands of the past", while Kerrang! hailed the album as "beautiful and brash, driven and divine".

McLaughlin's sole criticism of Eternity, in Your Arms was "that "Darling" is shamelessly indebted to its influences", although the writer suggested that "there's enough imagination packed into every other crevice to forgive such indiscretions". Similarly, Barbour also highlighted the derivative nature of "Darling", noting that it "staggers the line between homage to and pastiche of Alkaline Trio". The Metal Hammer writer also questioned the inclusion of "Misery", which had been previously featured on The Stranger EP in 2016, although he conceded that "it would be churlish to pretend [it doesn't] make sense in the context of the album, or in any way ruin its masterful pacing".

=== Chart performance ===
Upon its release, Eternity, in Your Arms debuted at number 18 on the UK Albums Chart. It also topped the UK Rock & Metal Albums Chart, and entered the UK Physical Albums Chart at number 13, the UK Album Sales Chart at number 14, and UK Album Downloads Chart at number 20. The album also debuted at number 17 on the Scottish Albums Chart.

=== Accolades ===
Publication	Accolade	Year	Rank	Ref.
Alternative Press	The 40 Best Albums of 2017	2017	none	
Kerrang!	Kerrang!'s Albums of 2017	2017	11	
NME	NME's Albums of the Year 2017	2017	36	

== Track listing ==
No.	Title	Writer(s)	Length
1.	"Black Rain"	Will Gould; Ian Miles; Oliver Burdett; Matt Reynolds	3:30
2.	"Poison Pens"	Gould; Miles	2:55
3.	"Suzanne"	Gould; Miles	2:40
4.	"Hiding with Boys"	Gould; Miles; Burdett; Neil Kennedy	3:34
5.	"Misery"	Gould; Miles	3:48
6.	"Down Below"	Gould; Miles; Kennedy	3:30
7.	"Room 309"	Gould; Miles	2:48
8.	"Crickets"	Gould; Miles	3:48
9.	"Darling"	Gould; Miles; Burdett; Kennedy	2:48
10.	"Winona Forever"	Gould; Miles	3:26
11.	"I Choose to Live"	Gould; Miles	3:21

== Personnel ==
- Will Gould – vocals
- Ian Miles – lead guitar, backing vocals
- Oliver Burdett – rhythm guitar
- Sean Scott – bass guitar
- Dan Bratton – drums
- Hannah Greenwood – keyboards, vocals, violin
- Ellie Price – gang/choir vocals, spoken word ("Black Rain")
- Matt Reynolds – gang/choir vocals, additional guitar ("Black Rain")
- Lewis Johns – gang/choir vocals
- Joe Spratt – gang/choir vocals
- James Harding – gang/choir vocals
- Cat Lay – gang/choir vocals
- Joshua Pearl – gang/choir vocals
- Jake Tilley – gang/choir vocals
- Mikey Webber – gang/choir vocals
- Greg Davies – trumpet
- Neil Kennedy – production, engineering, additional instrumentation and backing vocals
- Daly George – engineering assistance
- Neal Avron – mixing
- Ted Jensen – mastering
- Nicky Barkla – cover artwork
- Jay Wennington – photography

== Chart positions ==
Chart (2017)	Peak position
Scottish Albums (OCC)	17
UK Albums (OCC)	18
UK Rock & Metal Albums (OCC)	1
