= Our Time Down Here =

English punk band

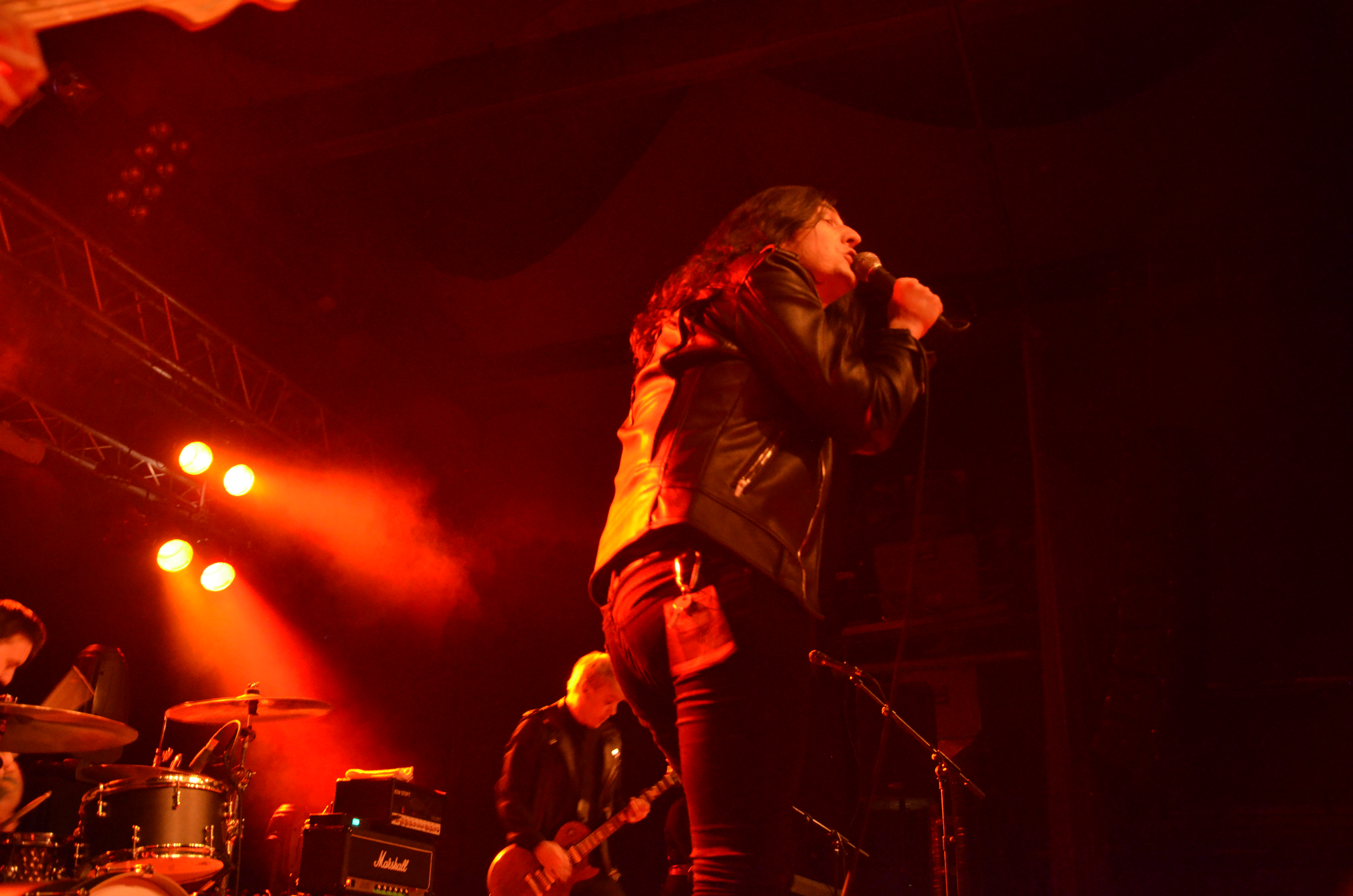
- Gould (front) and Miles (back) performing with Creeper in 2016.

Background information
- Origin: Southampton, England
- Genres: Melodic hardcore; punk rock; hardcore punk; horror punk
- Years active: 2006–2013; 2022
- Labels: Palm Reader, Nothing to Prove, Banquet, Punktastic
- Spinoffs: Creeper
- Past members: Will Gould; Ian Miles; Gary Painting; Andy Mehers; Shane Bonthuys; Greg Churcher; Chris Taylor; Drew Comley

Our Time Down Here was an English punk rock band from Southampton, England, formed in 2006. Their song "Black Ice & Bad Advice", from their second album Midnight Mass, gained radio play on BBC Radio. NME said, in reference to the band's debut album, "if there's a finer UK hardcore album released this year then I'd really, really really like to hear it". Vice Media referred to them as "UK punk's best-kept secret". Funeral for a Friend lead vocalist Matthew Davies-Kreye and Natives member Jack Fairbrother were outspoken supporters of the band. After the band's separation in 2013, Gould and Miles went on to form Creeper.

== History ==
Our Time Down Here formed in 2006, however their original singer was kicked out abruptly soon after, leading to their recruitment of former-Tight like Strings vocalist Will Gould, who at the time was in his teens, unlike Painting, Churcher and Taylor, who were into adulthood. Their name is a references to the Goonies. They went on their first UK tour with fellow Southampton band Take Em Out, which featured guitarist Ian Miles, who would eventually join Our Time Down Here as an additional guitarist in 2010. They released their eponymous debut EP on 25 October 2007 through Punktastic records, which was then re-released in 2008 through Banquet records, with an additional two demo tracks. Following the release of the EP, the band's bass player departed, being replaced by Andy Mehers.

On 13 October 2009 they released their debut album "Live. Love Let Go". It was around this time that some of the members had so little money that they were sharing a studio apartment in Shirley with drug dealers, that had a rat infestation.

In 2010, they toured Europe in support of the American band Hit the Switch, which was followed by a UK tour in support of A Loss for Words and LYU, which was followed by UK and European headline tours in December and over into 2011.

Their 2011 EP, entitled Last Light was written exclusively by Gould and the band's new guitarist Ian Miles. The two would record guitars and program drums in Gould's flat during the day, as his roommates were not home, and record vocals in a car in the countryside at night. They pursued an intentionally different, more cathartic and personal, sound on the record to avoid burnout. However, it was around this time that founding drummer Chris Taylor departed from the band due to the toll that so frequently touring took on some aspects of his life, being replaced by Shane Bonthuys. In January 2012 they announced that their second studio album, Midnight Mass, would be released on 6 March 2012, along with a series of UK headlining tour dates. Gould cited his intention for the sound of the record to be "if Green Day created a punk rock opera", doing so by embracing more theatrical influences, such as The Rise and Fall of Ziggy Stardust and the Spiders from Mars by David Bowie, The Art of Drowning by AFI, and Good Mourning by the Alkaline Trio. Lyrically, the album was based on love letters written by Gould's step-mother's broker and his wife, which Gould had found while clearing out the man's room after he a stroke. The album's opening track "7th October 1984" was made up entirely of words from the letters. In May of the same year, they opened the Macbeth stage at Slam Dunk Festival.

In 2013 they announced the dates for their final tour, with support by Grader, and would take place between 30 May and 6 June of the same year.

On 8 November 2022, the band announced a one-off reunion show at the Joiners, Southampton, which then took place on 10 December 2022.

=== Legacy ===
They have been cited as an influence by Southampton punk rock band Miss Vincent. After the band's 2013 breakup, Gould and Miles formed the band Creeper with former members of Hang the Bastard, Ghosts on Pegasus Bridge and Doomed from Day One, which was originally planned to be a dark wave project, but ended up embracing more punk influences.

== Musical style and influences ==
The band have been described as hardcore punk, punk rock, and melodic hardcore, incorporating elements of youth crew, characterised by fast tempos and melodic sections. Their sophomore album Midnight Mass has been described as more theatrical than their previous hardcore punk work. Their early releases were compared to groups such as Comeback Kid, Strike Anywhere, Shook Ones, Kid Dynamite and Lifetime, whereas Midnight Mass is considered more emotional and gothic, leading to it being compared to AFI and the Damned, and even categorised as horror punk. BBC has even cited them as an "indie metal" band.

They have cited influences including Lifetime, Jawbreaker, Hot Water Music and The Bouncing Souls, whereas their later sound was more-so influenced by early-AFI, David Bowie, Energy, Alkaline Trio, the Cult, the Damned, the Sisters of Mercy, the Cure and Dead Man's Bones.

== Members ==
Final line-up

- Will Gould - vocals (2006–2013, 2022)
- Gary Painting - guitar (2006-2013, 2022)
- Ian Miles - guitar (2010-2013, 2022)
- Andy Mehers - bass (2008-2012, 2022)

Past members

- Greg Churcher – bass (2006–2009)
- Chris Taylor – drums (2006–2011)
- Shane Bonthuys - drums (2011-2013)
- Drew Comley - bass (2012-2013)

Touring Members

- Jake Fogarty - drums (2022)

== Discography ==
Studio albums

- Live. Love. Let Go (2009)
- Midnight Mass (2012)

EPs

- Our Time Down Here (2007)
- Last Light (2011)
