= The Stranger (EP) =

EP by Creeper
- Released: 19 February 2016
- Recorded: 2015
- Studio: The Ranch Production House (Southampton, England)
- Genre: Horror punk; punk rock
- Length: 16:16
- Label: Roadrunner
- Producer: Neil Kennedy

Creeper chronology
The Callous Heart (2015)	The Stranger (2016)	Eternity, in Your Arms (2017)

Singles from The Stranger
- 1. "Black Mass" Released: 11 January 2016

The Stranger is the third EP by English rock band Creeper. Recorded at The Ranch Production House in Southampton with producer Neil Kennedy, it was released on 19 February 2016 by Roadrunner Records. The EP was the band's first release to chart, reaching the top ten of the UK Rock & Metal Albums Chart. "Black Mass" and "Astral Projection" were released as music videos.

The material for The Stranger was written mostly by Creeper vocalist Will Gould and guitarist Ian Miles, following the departure of second guitarist and frequent songwriter Sina Nemati in December 2015. The EP is the first to feature contributions from Oliver Burdett, who replaced Nemati, as well as keyboardist and backing vocalist Hannah Greenwood, who had previously been a touring member of the band.

The Stranger received positive reviews from the majority of music critics, who praised the EP in line with 2014's Creeper and 2015's The Callous Heart as an indication of the band's potential future success. Songs such as "Black Mass", "Misery" and "Astral Projection" in particular were highlighted as some of the year's best songs by multiple publications, earning Creeper a number of award nominations.

== Background ==
In December 2015, Creeper announced that their third EP The Stranger would be released in February 2016, and would feature contributions from new guitarist Oliver Burdett (who replaced Sina Nemati) and keyboardist Hannah Greenwood (who was originally a touring member for the band). The recording of the EP was influenced by the work of veteran producer Jim Steinman, which Stereoboard.com's Alec Chillingworth claimed is most evident on the songs "The Secret Society" and "Black Mass". Other artists named by vocalist Will Gould as influences on the EP include Arcade Fire ("The Secret Society" was originally written to sound like the song "Wake Up"), R.E.M. (Gould wrote "Valentine" with the band in mind to make it sound "Poppy but not patronisingly so") and Alkaline Trio (one of multiple influences on "Black Mass").

Prior to its release, The Stranger was made available for free online streaming on the band's website. "Black Mass" was released as the first song from the EP, along with a music video, on 28 January 2016. The video for the song was filmed in a rehearsal room in Southampton in which the band used to practise, which Gould claimed "gave the video a quiet sense of continuity". "Astral Projection" was released as the second music video from the EP on 11 May, featuring footage from the band's recent UK headline tour. The EP was promoted on a headline tour with Scottish support band Grader, as well as dates supporting Neck Deep and WSTR. In May 2016 Creeper supported Black Veil Brides vocalist Andy Biersack on his Homecoming Tour, performed second on the bill for Funeral for a Friend at their final show on 21 May at The Forum, London, and in August performed at the Reading and Leeds Festivals.

== Critical reception ==
Professional ratings
Review scores
Source	Rating
DIY	4/5 stars
Kerrang!	4/5 stars
Stereoboard	5/5 stars

Media response to The Stranger was generally positive. Reviewing the EP for DIY magazine, Tom Connick described that it "harbours a playful musicianship and songwriting talent that could turn groups ten times Creeper's age green with envy", praising Creeper's development on the EP from their previous releases. Kerrang! magazine's Paul Travers praised Creeper on The Stranger as "the closest anyone has come yet to MCR's punk-tinged sense of the grandiose", highlighting "Black Mass" as the EP's standout track and noting that the band "just get better and better". Awarding it a perfect score of five stars, Alec Chillingworth of Stereoboard also compared The Stranger favourably to The Callous Heart, highlighting "Misery" and "Astral Projection" and hailing the release as being "as good as rock music gets". In June 2016, Kerrang! featured "Black Mass" in its feature of "The Best Songs of 2016 So Far". Writer Paul Travers praised the track as "a supernatural goth-punk stalker with a bassline to kill for" and compared it stylistically to the work of My Chemical Romance, AFI and Misfits.

== Chart performance ==
The Stranger was Creeper's first release to chart, entering the UK Albums Chart at number 130, the UK Album Downloads Chart at number 59, the UK Rock & Metal Albums Chart at number 9, the UK Album Sales Chart at number 84, and the UK Vinyl Albums Chart at number 7.

== Track listing ==
No.	Title	Writer(s)	Length
1.	"The Secret Society"	Will Gould; Ian Miles	2:43
2.	"Valentine"	Gould; Miles; Sina Nemati	3:25
3.	"Black Mass"	Gould; Miles	2:21
4.	"Misery"	Gould; Miles	3:50
5.	"Astral Projection"	Gould; Miles	3:57

== Personnel ==
- Will Gould – vocals
- Ian Miles – guitar, backing vocals
- Oliver Burdett – guitar
- Sean Scott – bass
- Dan Bratton – drums
- Hannah Greenwood – keyboards
- Neil Kennedy – production, engineering

== Chart positions ==
Chart (2016)	Peak position
UK Albums (OCC)	130
UK Album Downloads (OCC)	59
UK Rock & Metal Albums (OCC)	9
UK Album Sales (OCC)	84
UK Vinyl Albums (OCC)	7
