= Energy (American band) =

American punk rock band

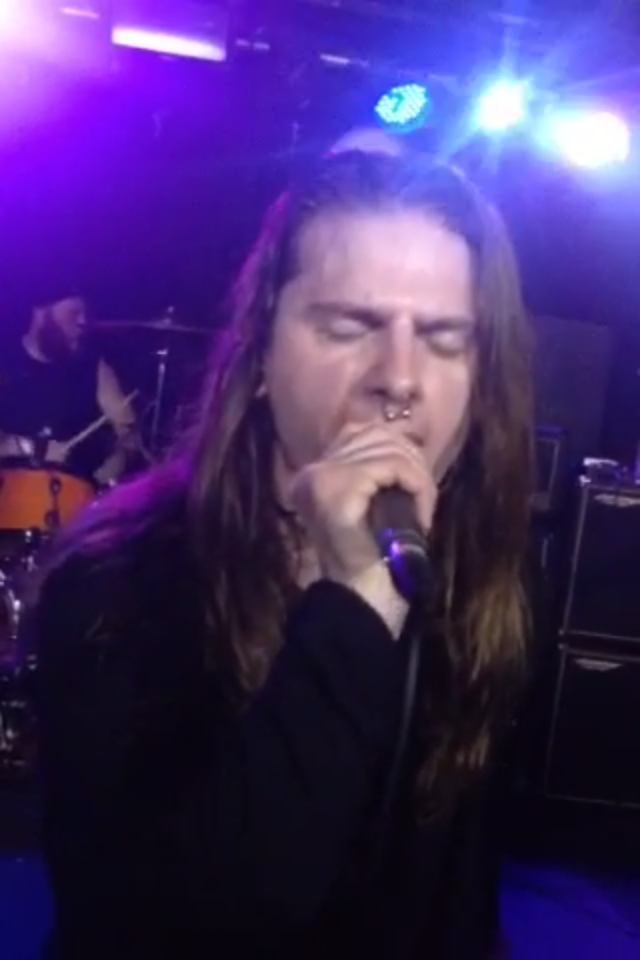
- Energy performing in 2017; Jason Tankerley (front).

Background information
- Origin: Stoughton, Massachusetts, United States
- Genres: Punk rock; melodic hardcore; horror punk; hardcore punk; pop punk
- Years active: 2006—present
- Labels: Bridge 9 Records; Rock Vegas Records; Monster Party Records
- Members: Jason Tankerley
- Past members: Mikey D.; Burton Wright; Rob Spearin; Joe Freedman; Dan Mancini; Mike Assatly; Craig Kenyon; Justin Flaherty; Keith Sidorowicz; Mike Rendini; Conor O'Brien; Nick Sullivan; Steve Duarte; Mike Natsios; Randy Mason; Mat Thompson; Jeremy Nichols; John Paolilli; Kevin Thompson; Chris Pina; Eric Molloy
- Website: www.thebandenergy.com

Energy is an American punk rock band, from Stoughton, Massachusetts, formed in 2006.

== History ==
=== Formation and Punch The Clock (2006–2007) ===
In 2006, Energy – which took its name from the title of punk rock band Operation Ivy's first release – formed before independently releasing their EP Punch The Clock, through Rock Vegas Records in 2007.

In August of that year, the band went on to play This Is Hardcore Festival alongside band such as Agnostic Front, Paint It Black, Have Heart, and Crime In Stereo.

=== Bridge 9 Records era: Invasions of the Mind, Race The Sun, & Walk Into the Fire (2008–2011) ===
After touring with The Carrier in March 2008, the band signed with Bridge 9 Records in May, to release their debut LP Invasions of the Mind, and EP Race The Sun.

In early July the band toured with Carry The Torch, and Heavy Hearted.

Throughout August/September they did a monthlong US tour with the band Know The Score.

The band then toured the U.S. with H_{2}O, Bane, and Cruel Hand in October, followed by their first European tour in support of Slapshot, alongside All for Nothing, in November, with one of the dates being Persistence Tour. Ending the year with a mini holiday tour with Set Your Goals, Four Year Strong and Every Avenue.

In March 2009, they toured the US with the band Defeater, before touring in May with The Mongoloids and Ambush!.

April would bring the band to New England Metal and Hardcore Festival XI 2009 where they would play alongside notable bands such as Lamb of God, As I Lay Dying, Children Of Bodom, God Forbid, Municipal Waste, Emmure, Winds Of Plague, All Shall Perish, Austrian Death Machine, iwrestledabearonce, Terror, Defeater, Have Heart, and Trapped Under Ice.

July they toured with Fallen From The Sky, and Debaser, playing Significant Festival 2009.

In September they did a headlining tour with support from A Loss For Words, and The Wonder Years.

October 2010 brought the release of the EP Walk Into The Fire.

With the release of the single "Secrets" in April 2011, came their departure from Bridge 9 Records shortly after.

=== Children of the Night (2011) ===
Forming in the fall of 2004, Children of the Night, a side project put together by singer Jason Tankerley and songwriter/producer Mike Rendini, began doing complex renditions of Misfits songs, before putting together original material containing the same morbid feel crossed with the catchiness of 50s Doo-Wop and early 60's rock n roll.

Initially self released under the Children of the Night moniker in 2006, the aforementioned material saw a proper release in 2011, as Energy's Children of the Night EP.

=== Apparition Sound, I Play for Keeps, & A Tribute to the Misfits (2012–2016) ===
After becoming the sole songwriter for Energy in 2012, Jason Tankerley began writing songs for what would eventually make up Energy's 2016 album Apparition Sound, released through Monster Party Records.

During this time, Energy released the single "I Play for Keeps" in February 2012 and a music video for the song "Another Yesterday" in October.

The band then went on to release their Misfits tribute album a Tribute to the Misfits, February 2014.(Down for Anything Records)

October 2015 saw the release of the music video for their cover of the Ramones' classic "Pet Sematary".

In 2016, the band released their music video for "They".

=== Under the Mask and UK tours (2017) ===
In March 2017, the band toured the UK for the first time ever with Creeper, Puppy, and Milk Teeth.

May brought the release of the music video for "A Prayer for Rain".

On July 21, the band released the EP Under the Mask through Shadowland Productions, which was followed by their first ever headlining tour of the U.K. with Miss Vincent as the support act.

=== Energy (2018–present) ===
Energy then went on to release a self titled compilation album Energy in 2018, which is a compilation album spanning the first five years (2012-2017) of lead singer Jason's musical output as the band's sole songwriter.

It was announced in June 2021 that Energy will be releasing a cover version of the Samhain song "Archangel” for the album "World Without End: An Underground Tribute To Samhain" on July 9, 2021, via Black Donut Records.

== Musical style and influence ==
The band's musical style has been described as punk rock, melodic hardcore, horror punk and pop punk, drawing from a wide range of musical influences from bands like The Misfits, The Ramones, Rancid, AFI, 7 Seconds, Minor Threat and Black Flag, to other influences such as Weezer, The Smashing Pumpkins, The Beach Boys and The Cure.

Over the years, Tankerley's vocal delivery has been compared to the likes of Davey Havok (AFI), Michale Graves (ex-misfits), and Zoltán Téglás (ex-Pennywise) while adding his own vast array of vocal influences.

The band has been cited as an influence by Creeper and Our Time Down Here.

== Discography ==
=== Albums ===
Year	Title	Label	Format
2008	Invasions of the Mind	Bridge 9 Records	CD, digital download, LP
2016	Apparition Sound	Monster Party Records	CD, digital download

=== Extended plays ===
Year	Title	label	Format
2007	Punch the Clock	Rock Vegas Records	CD, digital download
2008	Race the Sun	Bridge 9 Records	digital download, 7"
2010	Walk Into the Fire	Bridge 9 Records	digital download, 7"
2011	Children of the Night		CD, digital download, 7"
2012	I Play for Keeps		digital download
2013	New Worlds of Fear	Monster Party Records	CD, digital download
2014	A Tribute To the Misfits	Monster Party Records	CD, digital download
2017	Under the Mask	Shadowland Productions	CD, digital download

=== Live albums ===
Year	Title	Label	Format
2009	Into the Dark	Monster Party Records	CD

=== Compilations ===
Year	Title	label	Format
2018	Energy	Monster Party Records	digital download, CD

=== Singles ===
- Secrets (2011)
- The Letter (2011)
- Another Yesterday (2012)
- 25 Holidays (2012)
- The Witching Hour (2017)
- A Prayer for Rain (2017)
- Leave Me Alone (2019)
- Archangel (2021)

== Music videos ==
List of music videos, showing year released and director
Title	Year	Director(s)
"Streetlights"	2006	Rob Soucy
"Another Yesterday"	2012	Rose Glen Entertainment
"Pet Sematary"	2015	Meghan Caseau
"They"	2016	Anthony Grassetti
"A Prayer For Rain"	2017	Meghan Caseau

== Members ==
=== Current line-up ===
- Jason Tankerley – lead vocals (2006–present), guitar, bass, drums (2012–present)

=== Past members ===
- Mikey D. – guitar (2006)
- Burton Wright – drums (2006)
- Rob Spearin – guitar (2006—2007)
- Joe Freedman – guitar (2007—2010)
- Dan Mancini – guitar (2007—2010)
- Mike Assatly – drums (2006—2008)
- Craig Kenyon – drums (2008)
- Justin Flaherty – drums (2008)
- Keith Sidorowicz – drums (2008—2011)
- Kevin Thompson – drums (2011—2014)
- Mike Rendini – keyboard (2009-2011), guitar (2011—2012)
- Conor O'Brien – bass (2006—2012)
- Chris Pina – guitar (2011—2016)
- Jeremy Nichols – guitar (2012—2014)
- John Paolilli – guitar (2015—2016)
- Nick Sullivan – rhythm guitar (touring 2016-2017)
- Steve Duarte – lead guitar (touring 2016-2017)
- Mike Natsios – bass (touring 2016-2017)
- Randy Mason – drums (touring 2016-2017)
- Eric Molloy – drums (2017)

Timeline
