= Hiding with Boys =

Single by Creeper

from the album Eternity, in Your Arms
- Released: 12 December 2016
- Genre: Punk rock; emo
- Length: 3:34
- Label: Roadrunner
- Songwriter(s): Will Gould; Ian Miles; Hannah Greenwood; Sean Scott; Dan Bratton; Oliver Burdett; Neil Kennedy
- Producer(s): Neil Kennedy

Creeper singles chronology
"Suzanne" (2016)	"Hiding with Boys" (2016)	"Black Rain" (2017)

"Hiding with Boys" is a song by English rock band Creeper. Written by the band (Will Gould, Ian Miles, Hannah Greenwood, Sean Scott, Dan Bratton and Oliver Burdett) with producer Neil Kennedy, it was featured on the band's 2017 debut studio album Eternity, in Your Arms. The track was released as the second single and music video from the album on 12 December 2016.

== Composition and lyrics ==
"Hiding with Boys" was described by Creeper's record label Roadrunner Records in a press release as a song which captures the band's "unique cocktail of rollicking punk rock and dark gothic romanticism" and "marries [the band's frontman] Will Gould's impassioned croon with sweet harmonies from keyboardist Hannah Greenwood". Speaking at the time of the song's release, Gould proposed that "It's a bridge of sorts from the band we were on the EPs to the band that we are now, and creating it helped us to find a way to bring our incredibly varied influences together". The vocalist described it as "a song of unrequited love told from the perspective of a 'tragic monster'" and described it as "a lyrical sequel of sorts" to The Stranger single "Black Mass". It was the first song to be written by the band for inclusion on Eternity, in Your Arms.

Reviewing the track for DIY magazine, Tom Connick described "Hiding with Boys" as a "foot-to-the-floor summer anthem", claiming that it shows the band's "punk-rock, Warped Tour influences" through "double-time drumming and searing three chord runs". Ticketmaster's Ben Tipple called it a "morose melody driven track", while Kerrang! Radio presented it as "a towering rock anthem worthy of vast arenas". Clash writer Dannii Leivers categorised the song as "nu-emo", while Anita Bhagwandas of the NME compared its style to that of The Cure. Gould has claimed that the chorus was intended to sound like a "downtown musical", and that the song is "one of the most fun" to perform live.

== Promotion and release ==
On 11 December 2016, "Hiding with Boys" received its worldwide premiere on the BBC Radio 1 Rock Show with Daniel P. Carter. The song was released as a digital download the following day, alongside a music video for the track. The video was filmed in Southampton and directed by Jamie Carter, who also worked on "Suzanne" and later "Black Rain". Summarising the content of the music video, Cat Velez of Promo News explained that "Our troubled protagonist is a middle-aged man, haunted by demons visible to him for mere seconds before dissapearing [sic] out of sight – but not out of mind". The protagonist in question is paranormal investigator James Scythe, the fictional subject of the lyrical concept of Eternity, in Your Arms, who is "stalked" by the titular subject of the band's 2016 EP The Stranger. "Hiding with Boys" serves as the first in a trilogy of narratively-linked videos for the album, which continued on "Black Rain".

== Critical reception ==
Media response to "Hiding with Boys" was positive. Stephen Ackroyd of Upset magazine described it as "another 10/10 amazing track" following previous single "Suzanne", praising it as "an arms aloft anthem that proves exactly why Creeper are the most exciting rock band in, y'know, like, forever". Kerrang! Radio claimed that the song "proves why Creeper are one of the most hotly tipped acts around". In her review of Eternity, in Your Arms, Clash writer Dannii Leivers praised the song's "fantastic chorus".
