= Black Rain (Creeper song) =

Single by Creeper

from the album Eternity, in Your Arms
- Released: 15 February 2017
- Length: 3:30 (album version); 3:09 (edited version)
- Label: Roadrunner
- Songwriter(s): Will Gould; Ian Miles; Hannah Greenwood; Sean Scott; Dan Bratton; Oliver Burdett
- Producer(s): Neil Kennedy

Creeper singles chronology
"Hiding with Boys" (2016)	"Black Rain" (2017)	"Misery" (2017)

"Black Rain" is a song by English rock band Creeper. Written by the band (Will Gould, Ian Miles, Hannah Greenwood, Sean Scott, Dan Bratton and Oliver Burdett), it was produced by Neil Kennedy and featured as the opening track on the band's 2017 debut studio album Eternity, in Your Arms. The song was released as the third single and music video from the album on 15 February 2017.

== Composition and lyrics ==
"Black Rain" was one of the final songs written for Eternity, in Your Arms, and was intended to serve as a "dramatic" opener to the album. Creeper frontman Will Gould named the track as "one of [the band's] favourite" songs on the album, claiming that it "shows the full range of the band". The song is the band's first to feature a solo vocal by keyboardist Hannah Greenwood, who "yells" the line "So darling just you shut your pretty mouth" in the chorus. It also features additional guitar by James Harding, as well as a spoken word intro by Ellie Price of Southampton-based math rock band Signals. Upon the song's release, Gould and Greenwood described "Black Rain" as "a bitter love song".

Reviewing the song for Upset magazine, Ali Shutler described the lyrical content of "Black Rain" as being "Soaked in heartbreak and dramatic consequences", proposing that it deals with the concept of "the frustrations of being young, free and wanting more centre stage" which, he claims, then lead to "uncertainty and self-doubt". Speaking about the style of the song for the NME, Anita Bhagwandas outlined that the song "opens with twinkly piano before a slathering of AFI-esque vocals amble up to provide perfect spookiness". Clash writer Dannii Leivers claimed that the song is influenced by the work of record producer Jim Steinman, describing it as a track which features "goth majesty".

== Promotion and release ==
"Black Rain" was premiered worldwide on BBC Radio 1 as MistaJam's "Hottest Record in the World" for 14 February 2017. The song was released as a digital download the following day, alongside a music video for the track. The video was filmed in a church in London with director Jamie Carter, who also worked on the videos for "Suzanne" and "Hiding with Boys". Speaking about the making of the video, Carter revealed that it was inspired by the story of Romeo and Juliet, and that it was his favourite of the trilogy produced for Eternity, in Your Arms.

== Critical reception ==
Media response to "Black Rain" was positive. Writing for Upset magazine, Ali Shutler hailed the song as the band's "latest and greatest" upon release. In a review of the single, Shutler described "Black Rain" as "Epic and built to inspire a thousand ideas", praising it as "the first time Creeper have properly stuck their flag in the ground, taken a little bit of everything they love, and proudly declared 'this is us'". DIY writer Will Richards applauded the song as "a thunderous next step for the Southampton punks".
