= Christmas (Creeper EP) =

EP by Creeper
- Released: 8 December 2017
- Studio: Miloco Studios (London, England)
- Genre: Horror punk; punk rock; Christmas music
- Length: 9:15
- Label: Roadrunner
- Producer: Creeper

Creeper chronology
Eternity, in Your Arms (2017)	Christmas (2017)	Sex, Death & the Infinite Void (2020)

Singles from Christmas
- 1. "Fairytale of New York" Released: 1 December 2017

Christmas is the fourth EP by English rock band Creeper. Released on 8 December 2017 by Roadrunner Records, it features cover versions of two popular Christmas songs – "Fairytale of New York", originally recorded by The Pogues, and "Blue Christmas", most famously recorded by Elvis Presley – as well as an original track called "Same Time Next Year?". The EP was preceded by the release of "Fairytale of New York" as a single on 1 December 2017.

== Background ==
Creeper's Christmas EP was announced on 1 December 2017, with the band's recording of The Pogues' "Fairytale of New York" released on the same day. Speaking about the decision to cover the song, the band's frontman Will Gould explained that "Ever since we were kids, Fairytale Of New York has always been our favourite Christmas song. Shane MacGowan and Kirsty MacColl trading insults in the lyrics and the overall sad tone of the song always appealed to us – we've wanted to cover it for some time." The EP was released on 8 December 2017 as a digital download and on streaming platforms.

In a 2022 interview with the NME, Gould suggested that he regretted recording the Christmas EP. Talking about the potential release of new music, he stated: "We can't be one of those bands that chucks out a song a week, because you end up with a load of rubbish. Your Spotify is basically your permanent record. I know I've got some blemishes on there – I did do that Christmas record – but for the most part, I only want things on there that I'm proud of, rather than shit I threw out because nothing else was happening."

== Track listing ==
No.	Title	Writer(s)	Length
1.	"Same Time Next Year?"	Creeper	3:06
2.	"Fairytale of New York" (The Pogues cover)	Jem Finer; Shane MacGowan	4:02
3.	"Blue Christmas" (Elvis Presley cover)	Billy Hayes; Jay Johnson	2:07

== Personnel ==
- Will Gould – vocals, production
- Hannah Greenwood – keyboards, piano, penny whistle, vocals, production
- Ian Miles – guitars, keyboards, production
- Oliver Burdett – guitars, production
- Sean Scott – bass, production
- Dan Bratton – drums, percussion, production
- Ben Thackeray – engineering
- Rupert Christie – mixing
- Dick Beetham – mastering
