= Black Mass (song) =

Single by Creeper

from the album The Stranger
- Released: 11 January 2016
- Genre: Horror punk
- Length: 2:21
- Label: Roadrunner
- Songwriters: Will Gould; Ian Miles
- Producer: Neil Kennedy

Creeper singles chronology
"The Honeymoon Suite" (2015)	"Black Mass" (2016)	"Suzanne" (2016)

"Black Mass" is a song by English rock band Creeper. Written by the group's lead vocalist Will Gould and guitarist and backing vocalist Ian Miles, it was produced by Neil Kennedy and featured on the band's 2016 third extended play (EP) The Stranger. The song was released as the only single from the EP on 11 January 2016, and as the first of two music videos on 28 January.

== Composition and lyrics ==
According to Creeper's lead vocalist Will Gould, the lyrics of "Black Mass" were written "from the perspective of the character of The Stranger, the heartbroken monster who is the EP's namesake. They're partly inspired by recounts of sleep paralysis, where sufferers describe seeing a 'black matter' or 'black mass' haunting them in their rooms at night, while they lie paralysed in bed." The song draws from a number of inspirations, including punk rock band Jawbreaker (on the verses), singer Elvis Presley (in the middle eight) and record producer Jim Steinman (on the chorus), all of which the band's frontman described as "on purpose and very intentional ... a pastiche, a wink and a nod to the listener".

Ali Shutler of Upset magazine described "Black Mass" as one of the fastest songs released by Creeper to date, noting a "rhythmic, frantic dance" pace in the intro and "the hurried yell of, 'Hey!'" which "sees the track kick in proper". In a review of the song for DIY, Tom Connick described "Black Mass" as a mix between "fist-aloft punk-rock and ballroom blitz", comparing its style to that of singer Meat Loaf and punk band Misfits. Shutler continued by claiming that, despite its fast pace and short running length, the track has "plenty of room for those big band theatrics", including Gould "channeling his inner-crooner".

== Promotion and release ==
"Black Mass" was premiered on the BBC Radio 1 Rock Show with Daniel P. Carter on 10 January 2016 as the day's "Rockest Record", before its single release the following day. The music video for the track followed on 28 January. Directed by Jamie Carter, the video was filmed in the band's hometown of Southampton at a rehearsal space in which Gould and others used to practise. Gould described the choice of location for the filming of the video as "really nice ... as it gave the video a quiet sense of continuity".

The music video for "Black Mass" combines footage of the band performing with "glimpses of [The Stranger]", the titular subject of the band's 2016 EP on which the song is featured. Gould outlined the concept of the video as "a dream that our EP's cover character named Madeline is experiencing. She's in the middle of an episode of sleep psychosis with the band performing to her in her dream. She awakes to find herself in her bedroom." He went on to describe the band's part in the video as "performing in a dream world".

== Critical reception ==
Media response to "Black Mass" was positive. Upset magazine's Ali Shutler claimed that the song is "made for massive rooms", while still being "just as unifying, emotional and powerful as anything [the band have] put their name to yet". Tom Connick of DIY magazine praised the song for showcasing The Stranger, which he claimed was the band's "most triumphant step ... yet", while Rock Sound writer Andy Biddulph hailed the track as "a goth-punk dream" and "just wonderful". The song was Q magazine's Track of the Day on 6 February 2016, and was also featured in the Kerrang! Best Songs of 2016 So Far" feature in June 2016, with writer George Garner praising it as "a supernatural goth-punk stalker with a bassline to kill for".
