= The Callous Heart =

EP by Creeper
- Released: 18 September 2015
- Recorded: 2015
- Studio: The Ranch Production House (Southampton, England)
- Genre: Horror punk; punk rock
- Length: 15:58
- Label: Roadrunner
- Producer: Neil Kennedy

Creeper chronology
Creeper (2014)	The Callous Heart (2015)	The Stranger (2016)

Singles from The Callous Heart
- 1. "Lie Awake" Released: 10 July 2015; 2. "The Honeymoon Suite" Released: 10 August 2015

The Callous Heart is the second extended play (EP) by English rock band Creeper. Recorded in early 2015 at the Ranch Production House in Southampton with producer Neil Kennedy, it was originally released in the UK on 18 September 2015 as the band's first release on Roadrunner Records. The EP was later issued internationally on 15 January 2016. The Callous Heart spawned Creeper's first two singles, "Lie Awake" and "The Honeymoon Suite", as well as a music video for "Allergies".

Written by the band's lead vocalist Will Gould and guitarists Ian Miles and Sina Nemati, the Callous Heart was Creeper's first release since signing with major label Roadrunner in June 2015. The EP was launched on 15 September with a special show at the Old Blue Last in London, and promoted on the UK Warped Tour later in the year. It was the group's last release with Sina Nemati, who left in December, and the first with keyboardist and vocalist Hannah Greenwood who joined at the same time.

== Background ==
Following the promotion of their self-titled debut EP, it was announced in June 2015 that Creeper had signed with Roadrunner Records. As part of the announcement, they also released the first track and music video from their upcoming second EP, "Lie Awake", which was described in the Roadrunner press release as "the first instalment of a two part story of life, love and obsession". Speaking to Upset magazine shortly after the announcement, vocalist Will Gould described "Lie Awake" as "the ultimate Creeper song", as well as explaining to Kerrang! that "I wrote this at a time when we were on tour and struggling to sleep. I would lie awake worrying about this life, my lifestyle, my relationships with people back home and the things I've missed out on!" A month later, "The Honeymoon Suite" was released as the EP's second song and video.

The Callous Heart was released on 18 September 2015, with the band celebrating the release with a launch show at the Old Blue Last in London. A third music video, for the song "Allergies", was released on 23 September. In promotion of the EP, Creeper supported influential horror punk band Misfits on a UK tour in August, followed by a number of shows with emo group Moose Blood in September. In October, they also joined newly formed hardcore punk band Frank Carter & The Rattlesnakes on tour in the UK. The Callous Heart was released internationally on 15 January 2016, when it was made available on digital platforms for the first time outside of the UK.

Creeper's second EP was their last release to feature guitarist Sina Nemati, who left the band in December 2015 to focus on his career as an audio engineer in London. He was replaced by Oliver Burdett, while at the same time keyboardist Hannah Greenwood – also featured on the Callous Heart – joined the group.

== Critical reception ==
Professional ratings
Review scores
Source	Rating
Dead Press	8/10 stars
Kerrang!	4/5 stars
Upset	5/5 stars

Media response to the Callous Heart was generally positive. Reviewing the EP for Kerrang! magazine, Thomas Doyle described Creeper's second release as "a record unafraid to step off into more esoteric, experimental territory," which he praised for building upon its predecessor Creeper, rather than the band having written "a carbon copy" of the previous release. Doyle compared the style of the Callous Heart to the music of AFI, Alkaline Trio, David Bowie, Brand New and My Chemical Romance, concluding that "This, then, is the sound of one of the most exciting bands in Britain getting even more exciting."

Upset writer Ali Shutler praised all five tracks on the Callous Heart and called the release "bewitching". Speaking about the style of the music on the EP, Shutler added that "The storytelling transport that gave Creeper its charm is alive and well here, but instead of scratching tales by candlelight, Creeper are standing, arms outstretched, ready and willing to pull you into this world." Zach Redrup of Dead Press described the EP as "the next step in Creeper's ladder towards becoming one of the UK's brightest new hopes", comparing its sound primarily to the music of My Chemical Romance and Alkaline Trio, which he claimed is evident in vocalist Will Gould's style compared to that of Gerard Way and Matt Skiba, respectively. Cassie Whitt of Alternative Press likened "The Honeymoon Suite" to AFI and Tiger Army.

== Track listing ==
No.	Title	Writer(s)	Length
1.	"Black Cloud"	Will Gould; Ian Miles	3:37
2.	"Honeymoon Suite"	Gould; Miles; Sina Nemati	2:50
3.	"Allergies"	Gould; Miles; Nemati	2:55
4.	"Lie Awake"	Gould; Miles; Nemati	3:20
5.	"Henley's Ghost"	Gould; Miles; Nemati	3:16

== Personnel ==
Creeper

- Will Gould – vocals
- Ian Miles – guitar
- Sina Nemati – guitar
- Sean Scott – bass
- Dan Bratton – drums

Additional personnel

- Hannah Greenwood – keyboards, strings, vocals
- Neil Kennedy – production, engineering
- Daly George – engineering assistance
