= Suzanne (Creeper song) =

Single by Creeper

from the album Eternity, in Your Arms
- Released: 3 October 2016
- Genre: Pop punk; punk rock
- Length: 2:40
- Label: Roadrunner
- Songwriter(s): Will Gould; Ian Miles; Hannah Greenwood; Sean Scott; Dan Bratton; Oliver Burdett
- Producer(s): Neil Kennedy

Creeper singles chronology
"Black Mass" (2016)	"Suzanne" (2016)	"Hiding with Boys" (2016)

"Suzanne" is a song by English rock band Creeper. Written by the band (Will Gould, Ian Miles, Hannah Greenwood, Sean Scott, Dan Bratton and Oliver Burdett), it was produced by Neil Kennedy and featured on the band's 2017 debut studio album Eternity, in Your Arms. The track was released as the lead single and music video from the album on 3 October 2016.

== Composition and lyrics ==
"Suzanne" was described by Creeper's record label Roadrunner Records in a press release as a song "which blends flamboyant teen scream theatrics with an adrenalised shot of punk 'n' roll and the impassioned mantra: 'I wanna die holding hands'." Speaking at the time of its release, the band's lead vocalist Will Gould presented the track as "a new landscape to explore, and a perfect introduction to the world of our album", describing the musical style of the track as a blend between 1990s punk rock and older rock and roll music.

In her review of Eternity, in Your Arms, Clash writer Dannii Leivers described "Suzanne" as "raging pop punk capable of uniting the hardcore kids, crusty punks and goths in one uber-alt mob", comparing it stylistically to preceding album track "Poison Pens". Anita Bhagwandas of the NME also categorised the track as pop punk, as well as likening Gould's vocals to those of Meat Loaf.

== Promotion and release ==
After their performances at the Reading and Leeds Festivals in August 2016, Creeper "vanished" from the public eye and began sharing clues for fans to follow in order to obtain information regarding the band. The clues eventually led to an answerphone message which detailed "the disappearance of James Scythe", the fictional subject of several songs to be featured on the album. The message also featured the line "On the 2nd of October 2016, we'll die holding hands", a reference to a line in "Suzanne".

When the band resurfaced on 2 October, "Suzanne" received its worldwide premiere on the BBC Radio 1 Rock Show with Daniel P. Carter. It was made available as a digital download the following day, when it was also given free to customers who pre-ordered Eternity, in Your Arms on the official Roadrunner Records store. The music video, directed by Jamie Carter, was also released the same day. According to TeamRock, the video combines "found footage belonging to the missing Scythe" with "neon-bathed performance" footage, was released on the same day. On 11 January 2017, the version of the song featured on music streaming service Spotify was changed to feature new lyrics.

== Critical reception ==
Media response to "Suzanne" was positive. Tom Connick of DIY claimed that the song "takes every facet of Creeper's delicately constructed world and polishes it to a blinding shine", hailing it as "nothing short of dazzling". Clash writer Robin Murray praised the band's "inherent live energy" on the recording. Upset magazine's Ali Shutler described "Suzanne" as "Snarling and built for mass participation but doused in young romance and a touch of magic", claiming that it "sees Creeper reaching scary new heights all over again".
