= Creeper (band) =

English rock band

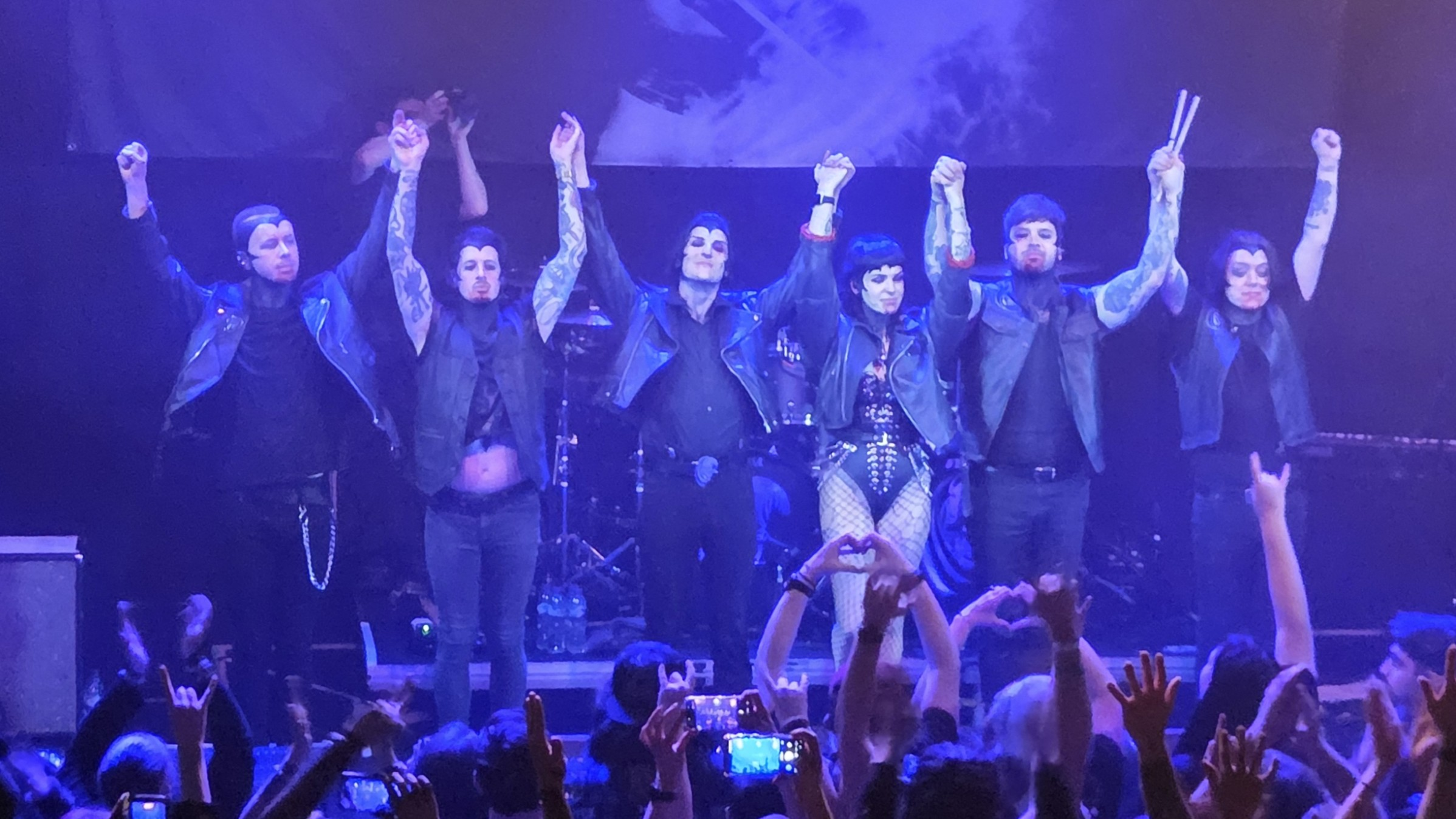
- Creeper onstage in Exeter, April 2026. L–R: Lawrie Pattison, Sean Scott, Will Gould, Hannah Greenwood, Jake Fogarty, Ian Miles.

Background information
- Also known as: Fugitives of Heaven (2019); The Weeping Widow (2022)
- Origin: Southampton, England
- Genres: Horror punk; gothic rock; glam rock; art rock
- Years active: 2014–present
- Labels: Spinefarm; Roadrunner
- Spinoffs: Salem
- Spinoff of: Our Time Down Here
- Members: Will Gould; Ian Miles; Sean Scott; Hannah Greenwood; Jake Fogarty; Lawrie Pattison
- Past members: Sina Nemati; Dan Bratton; Oliver Burdett
- Website: creepercult.com

Creeper are an English rock band from Southampton. Formed in 2014, the group originally featured vocalist Will Gould, guitarists Ian Miles and Sina Nemati, bassist Sean Scott, and drummer Dan Bratton. The band independently released their self-titled debut EP in 2014, before signing with Roadrunner Records and issuing follow-up The Callous Heart the next year. At the end of 2015, Nemati was replaced by Oliver Burdett and touring keyboardist/second vocalist Hannah Greenwood became an official band member. A third EP, The Stranger, was released in 2016 and reached the UK Rock & Metal Albums Chart top ten.

The group's full-length debut Eternity, in Your Arms reached number 18 on the UK Albums Chart in 2017. After touring extensively, Creeper took a year-long break and returned in 2020 with Sex, Death & the Infinite Void, which reached number 5 in the UK. Bratton and Burdett left shortly thereafter and the group released American Noir in 2021, after which Jake Fogarty took over from Bratton. Following tours for the pair of releases, Creeper signed with Spinefarm Records for 2023's Sanguivore. Guitarist Lawrie Pattison, who had been touring with the band since Burdett's departure, became an official band member in 2024.

Each of the band's albums are concept albums, featuring a distinct shift in musical style linking to their individual narratives. Album's musical styles have ranged from horror punk, to Americana-influenced glam rock, to gothic rock. The band's songwriting is typically led by Gould and Miles, although Nemati also co-wrote many of their early songs, while more recent material has been co-written by Greenwood and/or each album's producer. Creeper were hailed by critics as one of the best new rock bands shortly after their formation, winning awards from magazines Metal Hammer, Kerrang! and Rock Sound in 2016.

== History ==
=== 2014–2016: Formation and early years ===
Creeper were formed in Southampton in 2014 by lead vocalist Will Gould and guitarist and backing vocalist Ian Miles - who had previously worked together as members of punk rock band Our Time Down Here - along with second guitarist Sina Nemati, bassist and backing vocalist Sean Scott, and drummer Dan Bratton. When Miles and Gould originally conceived the idea for the band, they intended for it to be a New Romantic-influenced take on dark wave, before it eventually developed into a much more punk-influenced sound. It was Gould's idea to name the band Creeper, pleased by how it sounded like the name of a Stephen King novel and there wasn't any genre implied by it, two other names thrown around early on were Coven and Witch Cat. The quintet independently released their self-titled debut EP on 19 June 2014, which was later issued as a limited edition 12" vinyl by Palm Reader Records on 18 December. The band played their first headline show at the Joiners Arms on 1 August, followed by their first performance in London at The Old Blue Last on 13 September and a stint supporting Welsh group Funeral for a Friend. In June 2015 the group signed with Roadrunner Records and played at Download Festival for the first time. The band's second EP, The Callous Heart, was released on 18 September 2015 and launched at a special show three days before. Later in the year, the group toured with Misfits and later Moose Blood, as well as performing at the UK Warped Tour.

In December 2015, it was announced that Nemati had left Creeper in order to "concentrate on his sound engineering career in London", while touring keyboardist Hannah Greenwood was upgraded to a full-time member. The group's third EP, The Stranger, was released on 19 February 2016 and entered the UK Albums Chart at number 130. The EP was promoted on a headline tour with Scottish support band Grader, as well as dates supporting Neck Deep and WSTR. In May 2016, Creeper supported Black Veil Brides vocalist Andy Biersack on his Homecoming Tour, as well as performing second on the bill for Funeral for a Friend at their final show on 21 May at the O2 Forum. In June, the group contributed a cover of Iron Maiden's "The Evil That Men Do" to Kerrang! magazine's Maiden Heaven Volume 2: An All-Star Tribute To Iron Maiden album, and in August they contributed a recording of My Chemical Romance's "This Is How I Disappear" to the Rock Sound free release Rock Sound Presents... The Black Parade, a tribute album to The Black Parade.

=== 2016–2018: Eternity, in Your Arms cycle ===
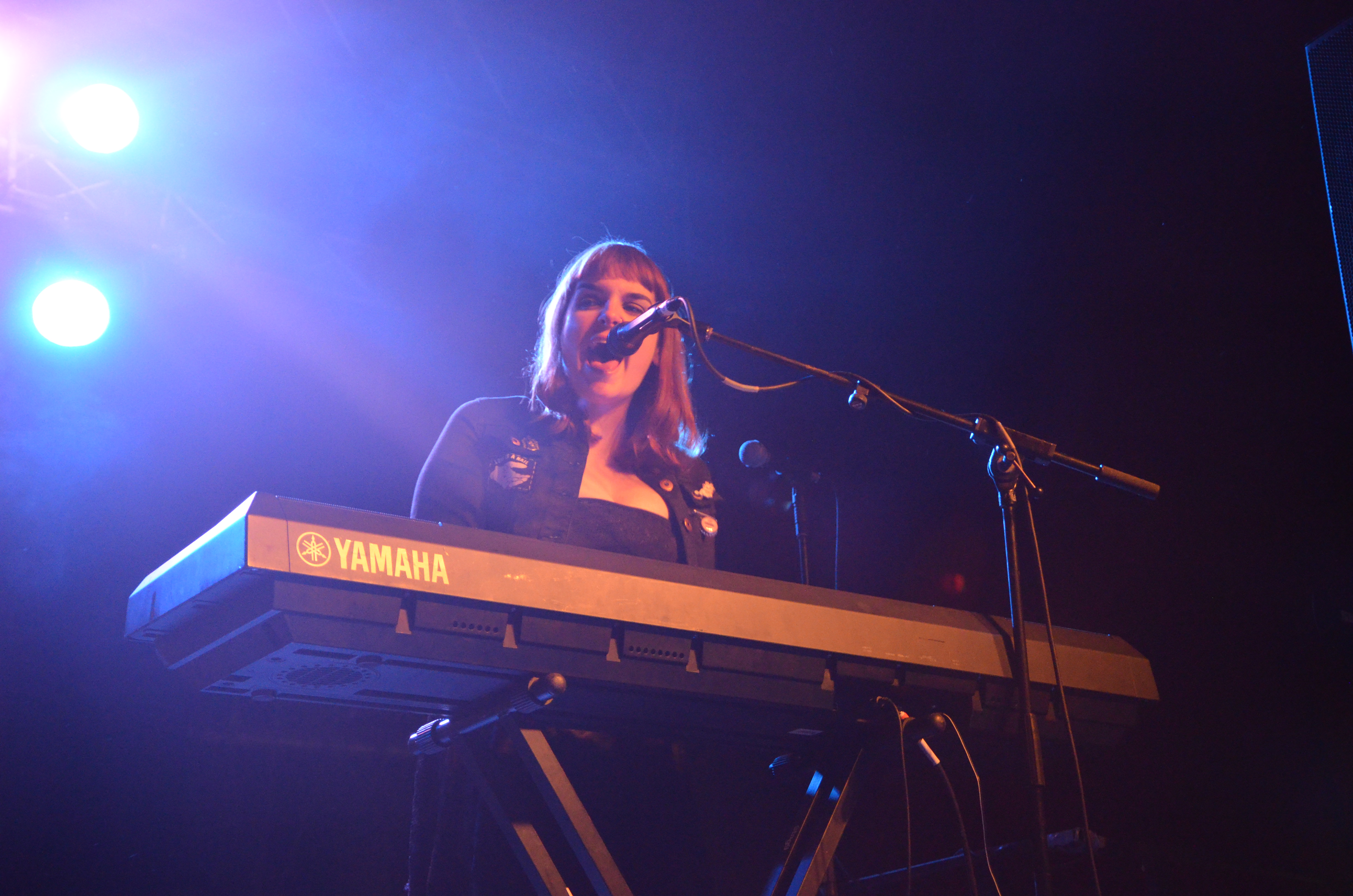
Keyboardist Hannah Greenwood, formerly a touring musician for the band, joined Creeper full-time in late 2015.

After Creeper performed at the Reading and Leeds Festivals in August 2016, the band's Twitter account began posting images of white noise, before their personal accounts were hidden or removed. A Southampton phone number used to promote The Stranger then featured a new voicemail message, which provided a link to a website detailing "the disappearance of James Scythe", featuring references to the band's EPs. In October, the band resurfaced with the announcement of their debut full-length album Eternity, in Your Arms, along with the release of its first track and video "Suzanne". Gould offered the following explanation of the album's inspiration: "Eternity, in Your Arms is a record, this time not only about being young and heartbroken, but about transition, about age and loss. Not only the loss of life, but the loss of ourselves. The pieces of the people we were." The band later supported Pierce the Veil alongside Letlive on a tour of the UK and Europe, which started on 29 October and ran until 6 December.

"Hiding with Boys" was released as the second track from Eternity, in Your Arms on 11 December 2016 when it was premiered on the BBC Radio 1 Rock Show, with a music video released for the track the following day. In promotion of the album, Creeper embarked on a headline tour on 25 March 2017 which included dates throughout Europe running into mid-April, alongside support acts Milk Teeth, Puppy and Energy. At the end of 2016, Creeper topped the Rock Sound readers' poll for Best British Newcomer, as well as being featured at seventh place in the poll for Best British Band and at fourth place in the Worst British Band poll. The magazine ranked The Stranger as its 36th best release of the year. The third song and video from Eternity, in Your Arms, entitled "Black Rain", were released on 14 February 2017.

Upon its release, Eternity, in Your Arms debuted in the top 20 of the UK Albums Chart, at number 18. It also debuted at number 1 on the UK Rock & Metal Albums Chart, and at number 17 on the Scottish Albums Chart. In April 2017, Creeper were nominated in the category of Breakthrough Band in the Alternative Press Music Awards. They were also nominated in the category of Best UK Band at the inaugural Heavy Music Awards, and headlined the awards ceremony on 24 August at the House of Vans in London. The band continued touring throughout 2017, including their first appearance on the main stage of Download Festival and all dates of the 2017 Warped Tour in the US and Canada between June and August. In June they announced another headline UK tour for the end of the year, The Theatre of Fear, which was described in its announcement as "a one-of-a-kind production being brought to six theatres across the country". The band have also worked on a book titled The Last Days of James Scythe, based on the ongoing story of the eponymous character, which is to be released on 30 November 2017 by independent publishers 404 Ink.

Creeper released Christmas on 8 December 2017, a holiday EP which includes covers of "Fairytale of New York" and "Blue Christmas", as well as the original track "Same Time Next Year?" The band supported Neck Deep and All Time Low on tour the following year, and later returned to the festival circuit with performances at 2000 Trees and Reading and Leeds. At their 1 November 2018 gig at London's Koko Venue, the band hung up their Callous Heart jackets and frontman Will Gould stated that "Not only is it the last show of this album, but it's the last show that we'll ever do" – a reference to David Bowie's Hammersmith Apollo gig on 3 July 1973 at which he announced the death of his Ziggy Stardust character. The band then left the stage and a montage of their career highlights was shown, which ended with the words "Even eternity ends". While Bowie continued his career after his 1973 show, no official statement was issued regarding whether or not Creeper would return in the future.

=== 2019–2022: Sex, Death & the Infinite Void ===
In September 2019, Creeper's members began teasing a return for the band online. A few days later, a show was announced for 1 November 2019 – exactly one year since their last appearance – at the 620-capacity venue 229 in London, under the pseudonym Fugitives of Heaven. The performance included the debut of a new song, "Born Cold", which was debuted on the BBC Radio 1 Rock Show the same night and released as a single on 3 November. In January 2020, it was announced that the band's second studio album would be titled Sex, Death & the Infinite Void. Like Eternity, in Your Arms, the album features a central narrative around which the songs are written, in this case focusing on the story of a relationship between protagonists Roe and Annabelle, who live in a fictional American city called Calvary Falls. "Annabelle" and "Cyanide" were issued as pre-release singles with accompanying music videos in January and February 2020, respectively. Regarding the break between releases, Gould explained that the band members had needed a break after the release of their first album and their subsequent success.

Due to the impact of the COVID-19 pandemic on the music industry, Creeper delayed the release of Sex, Death & the Infinite Void from May to July 2020, as well as pushing back the promotional God Can't Save Us Tour from April to August. The tour was later delayed again to December, postponed again partway through, and delayed until March 2022 with additional shows added. Upon the release of Sex, Death & the Infinite Void, the album debuted at number 5 on the main UK Albums Chart and followed Eternity, in Your Arms in topping the UK Rock & Metal Albums Chart. In September 2020, shortly after the album's release, the band announced that they had parted ways with drummer Dan Bratton, although no explanation was given for his departure.

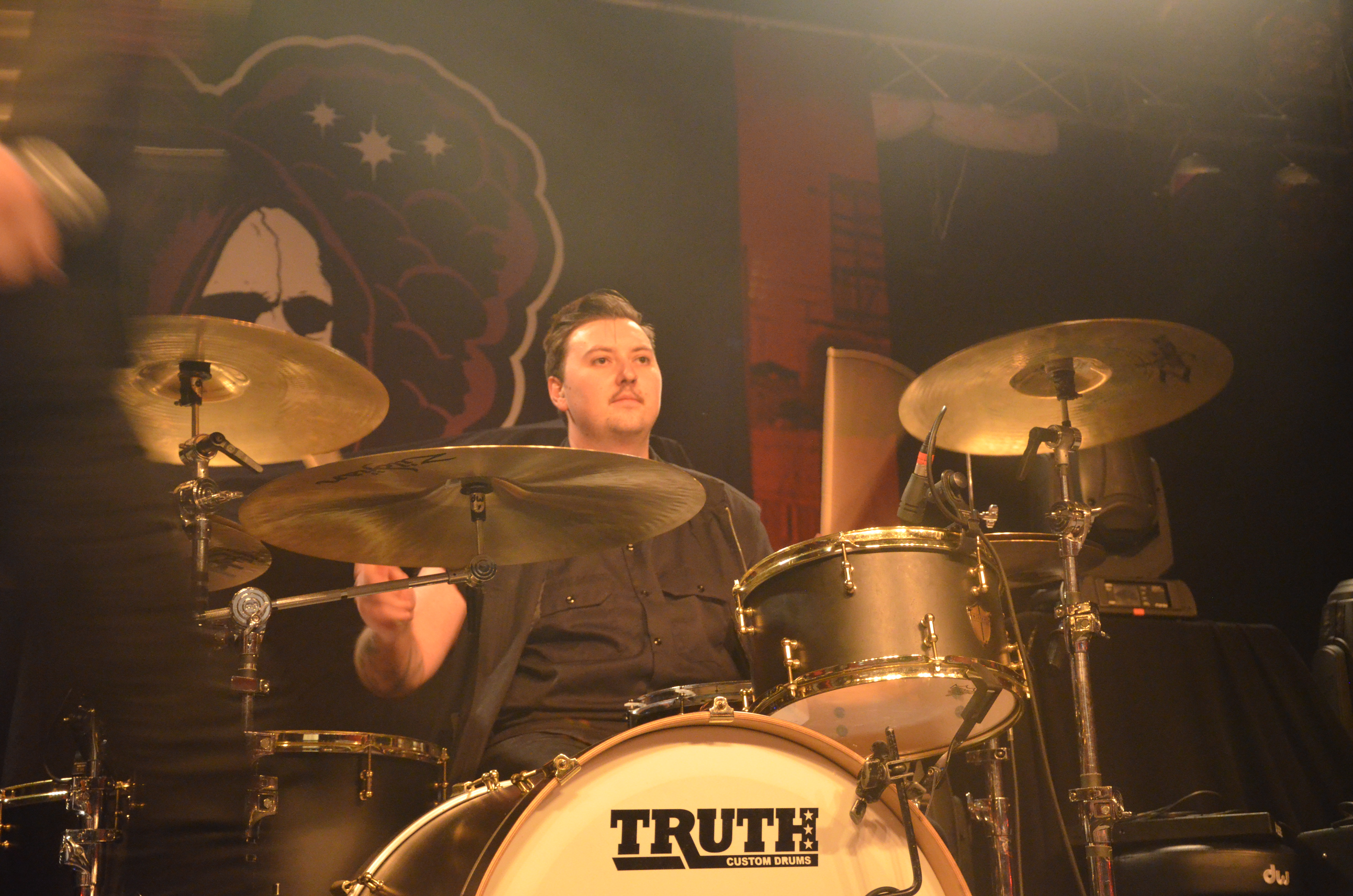
Shortly after the release of Sex, Death & the Infinite Void, Creeper parted ways with drummer Dan Bratton.

Following a hiatus due to COVID-19 challenges, during which time Gould launched a side project called Salem, in May 2021 Creeper released "Midnight" and announced new EP American Noir for release in July. They also announced that Oliver Burdett had left the band, while Jake Fogarty had taken over as drummer. American Noir reached number 13 on the UK Albums Chart. During the summer, the band headlined the Second Stage at Download Festival and performed at Slam Dunk Festival, with Miss Vincent's Lawrie Pattison brought in to perform as second guitarist. At the end of the year and beginning of 2022, the group completed their God Can't Save Us Tour following multiple postponements dating back almost two years. In May, the group supported Alice Cooper and The Cult on their UK co-headlining tour, which was followed by shows in Europe dubbed the "Angels Over Europe" tour, including support slots for My Chemical Romance. On 10 September, the band performed at Rise Festival in Newcastle under the name the Weeping Widow, which saw Greenwood singing for the entire set, without Gould. The band concluded 2022 with support dates for Enter Shikari in Australia in November, preceded by a special one-off headline show dubbed When the Sun Comes at the Roundhouse in London on 4 November 2022.

=== 2022–present: Sanguivore and Sanguivore II ===
At their 4 November 2022 show, Creeper announced that they had signed with Spinefarm Records and released a new single, "Ghost Brigade". In March 2023, the track was nominated at the Heavy Music Awards for Best Single, while the band were nominated in the categories of Best UK Artist and Best UK Live Artist. On 26 May 2023, the band released "Cry to Heaven" as the lead single from their third album Sanguivore, which was released on 13 October. The album will be promoted on the five-date Sacred Blasphemy UK Tour in November. Shortly after the album's announcement, Creeper performed live at the Heavy Music Awards, Slam Dunk Festival, and Download Festival. The band were featured on a reworked version of Static Dress's song "Welcome In...", which was released as a part of their EP Rouge Carpet Disaster (Redux) Volume 3, released on 3 November.

Sanguivore reached number 29 on the UK Albums Chart. At the end of the year, Metal Hammer named it the publication's album of the year based on votes from its staff writers. In promotion of the release, Creeper completed the six-date Sacred Blasphemy Tour in England and Scotland in early November, followed by a stint supporting Atreyu on the European leg of their We Want Your Skulls Tour, starting later that month. In March 2024, the band completed another run of UK shows dubbed the 12 Days of Night Tour, which was followed by a stint supporting Black Veil Brides on the band's Bleeders Tour in the US. Ahead of these tours, touring guitarist Lawrie Pattison was made an official member of the band.

At a one-off show at Koko in London on 31 May 2025, Creeper announced that their next album would be a sequel to Sanguivore, titled Sanguivore II: Mistress of Death. The first single from the album, "Headstones", was released on 6 June 2025. This was followed two months later by "Blood Magick (It's a Ritual)", alongside confirmation of a 31 October 2025 release date. Sanguivore II's storyline would follow the Mistress of Death as she hunts the fictitious rock vampire band. The band also confirmed in an interview with Valentino from the Aquarian, that "Prey For The Night" was originally written for Sex, Death & the Infinite Void.

== Musical style, influences and themes ==
Through their career, Creeper have consistently reinvented their sound and aesthetic. Each of their records and surrounding EPs, music videos and stage performances have been ways of telling the albums' stories. This style of theatricality has led publications such as Clash to call them an art rock band. In an interview with Riot Magazine, Gould stated:

when I was younger I never thought I’d be in a band, I thought I’d be making movies! I love music but I always wanted to tell stories and create a visual world. I ended up falling into a place where I was in Creeper and I was using those elements of screenwriting and storytelling in my music. So the concept thing came naturally as albums work like little films to us and come as second nature to me. I wanted it to feel like when you listen to it you escape into some other place and see something visual..

Eternity, in Your Arms and its preceding EPs were categorised by critics as horror punk, emo and goth punk, and compared to the sound of Alkaline Trio, Ink & Dagger, AFI, and My Chemical Romance. These songs included elements of glam rock, post-hardcore, pop punk, post-punk and psychobilly. The Stranger and The Callous Heart EPs were named for and established this era's titular characters: the Callous Hearts, based on the Lost Boys and the Stranger, based on Tick-Tock the Crocodile. Eternity, in Your Arms then followed a character inspired by Captain Hook known as James Scythe, a paranormal investigator who had gone missing. The band finally concluded this concept at their November 2018 performance at the Koko in London, where they killed off the Callous Hearts. During this era, the band cited musical influences including Marilyn Manson, AFI, Jawbreaker, Jim Steinman, Energy, David Bowie, Metallica, Tiger Army, Meat Loaf, Bonnie Tyler, Alkaline Trio, the Misfits, the Nerve Agents and the Cramps, in conjunction with taking influence from the imagery of films like Baz Luhrmann's Romeo + Juliet, Joel Schumacher's The Lost Boys and Phantom of the Paradise by Brian De Palma as well as novels and plays like J. M. Barrie's 1904 book Peter and Wendy and its 1954 stage musical adaptation.

Sex, Death and the Infinite Void was categorised by critics as rock and roll, gothic rock and glam rock, in addition to incorporating elements of pop punk, rockabilly and country music. This era's narrative followed an angel called Roe who comes to the small town of Calvary Falls, based on Dunsmuir, California, intending to warn people that in seven days the apocalypse will come. However, he soon finds himself turning to sin and falling in love with Annabelle, a married human woman, with whom he begins an affair. Roe is subsequently murdered by Annabelle's husband Buddy Calvary. On this album, the band cited their influences as David Bowie's Aladdin Sane, Roy Orbison's Mystery Girl, Roxy Music, T. Rex, Mott the Hoople, the Beatles and Britpop bands such as Suede, Pulp and Oasis. NME writer Dannii Leivers described it as "a bombastic, goth rock epic, as theatrical and sweeping as a batwing lace sleeve" and Ashley Perez Hollingsworth of Genre is Dead said that it "isn’t just an album. It’s the soundtrack for the movie Creeper has yet to make". The album's accompanying EP American Noir was categorised as gothic rock.

Their third album Sanguivore was categorised by critics as gothic rock and heavy metal. The band cited the Sisters of Mercy, Danzig, the Damned, the Cult, Orchestral Manoeuvres in the Dark, Celine Dion, Jim Steinman's Bad for Good (1981), and Nick Cave and the Bad Seeds' Murder Ballads (1996), as influences.

== Band members ==
Current

- Will Gould (aka. William von Ghould) – lead vocals (2014–present)
- Ian Miles – guitar, backing vocals (2014–present)
- Sean Scott – bass, backing vocals (2014–present)
- Hannah Greenwood – keyboards, backing and lead vocals, violin (2015–present; touring member 2015)
- Jake Fogarty – drums, percussion (2021–present)
- Lawrie Pattison – guitar (2024–present; touring member 2021–2024)

Former

- Dan Bratton – drums, percussion (2014–2020)
- Sina Nemati – guitar, backing vocals (2014–2015)
- Oliver Burdett – guitar, backing vocals (2015–2021)

Timeline

Gallery
Members of Creeper performing in Exeter, 10 April 2026:

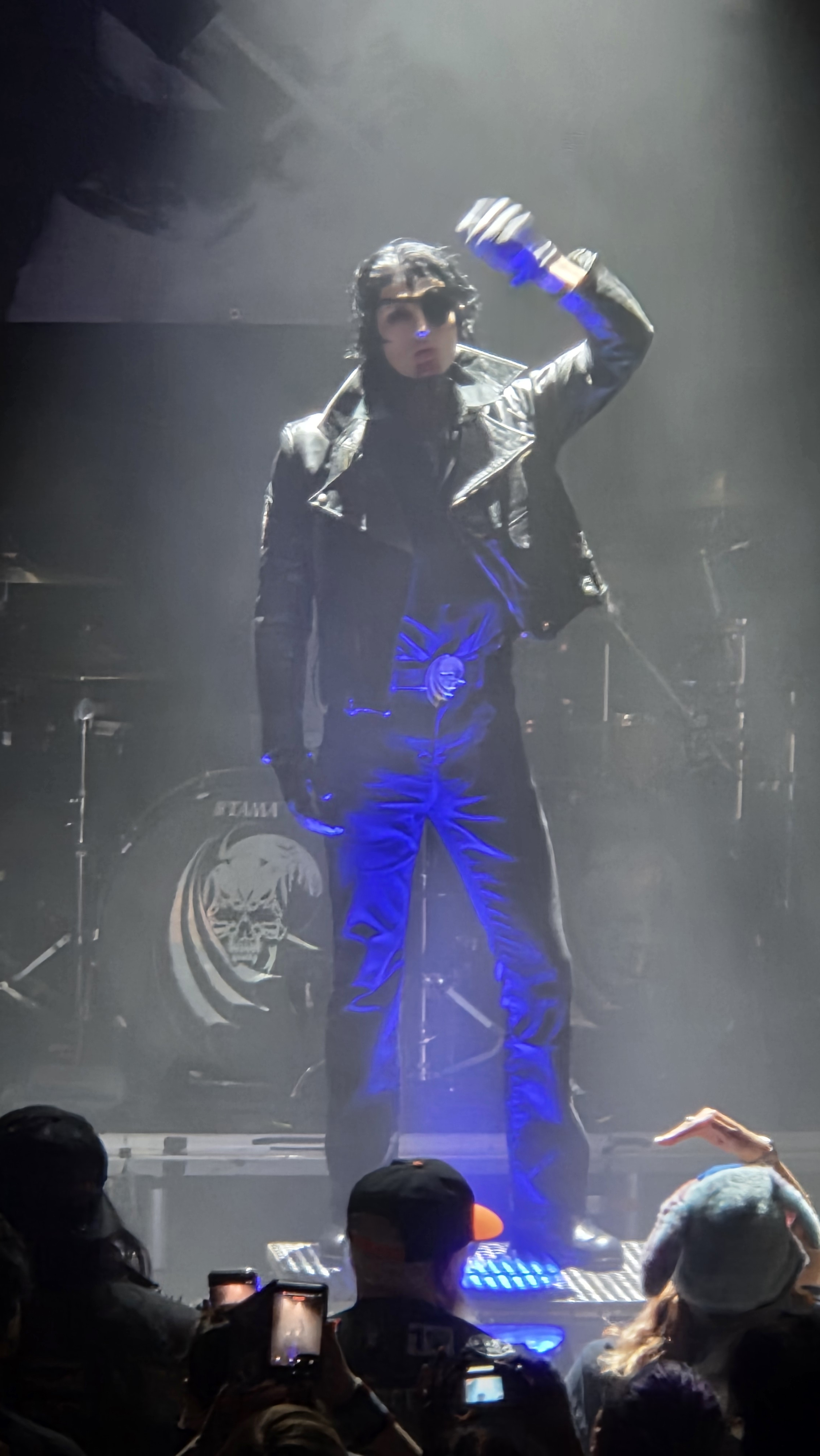
Will Gould

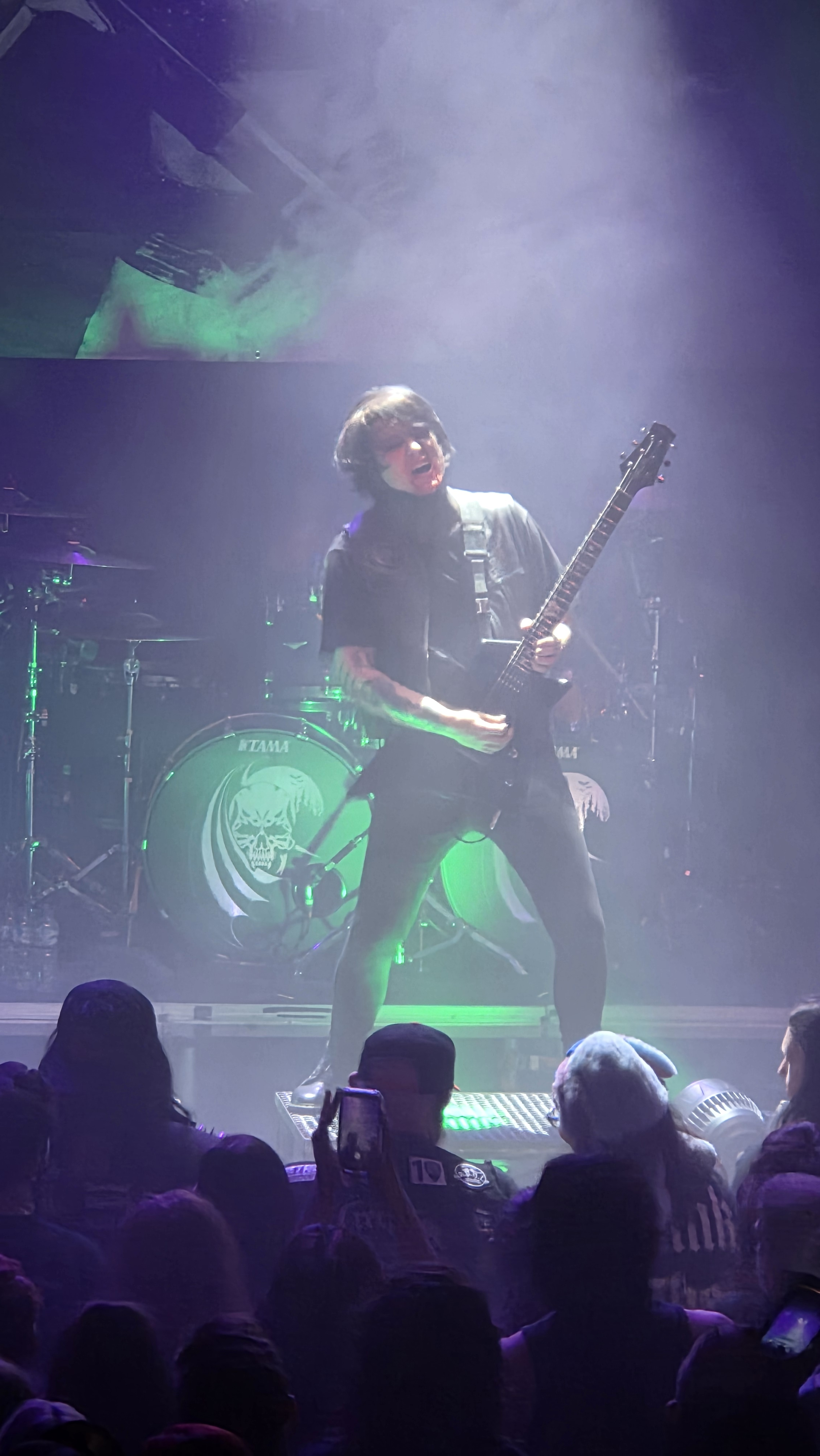
Ian Miles

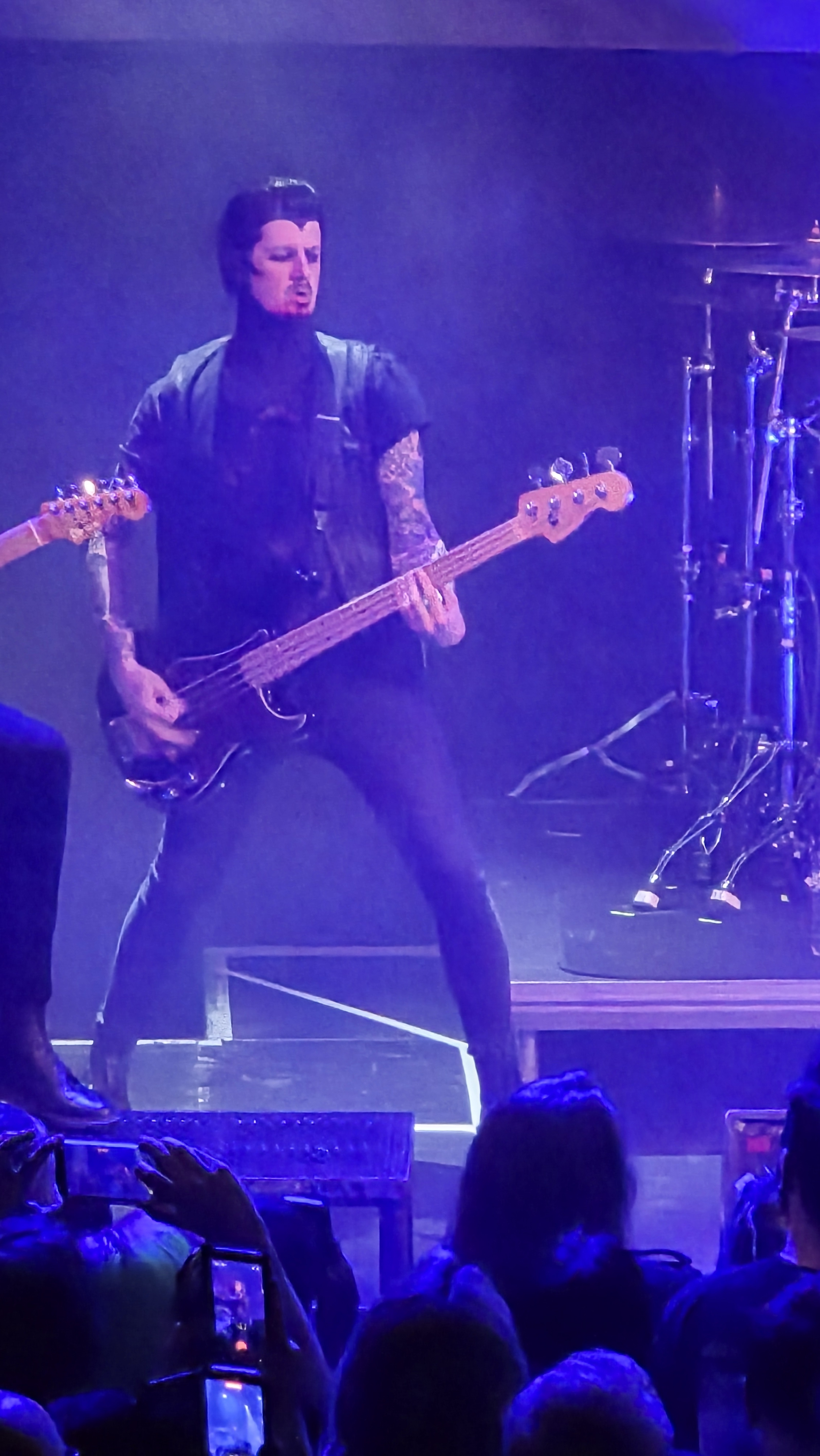
Sean Scott

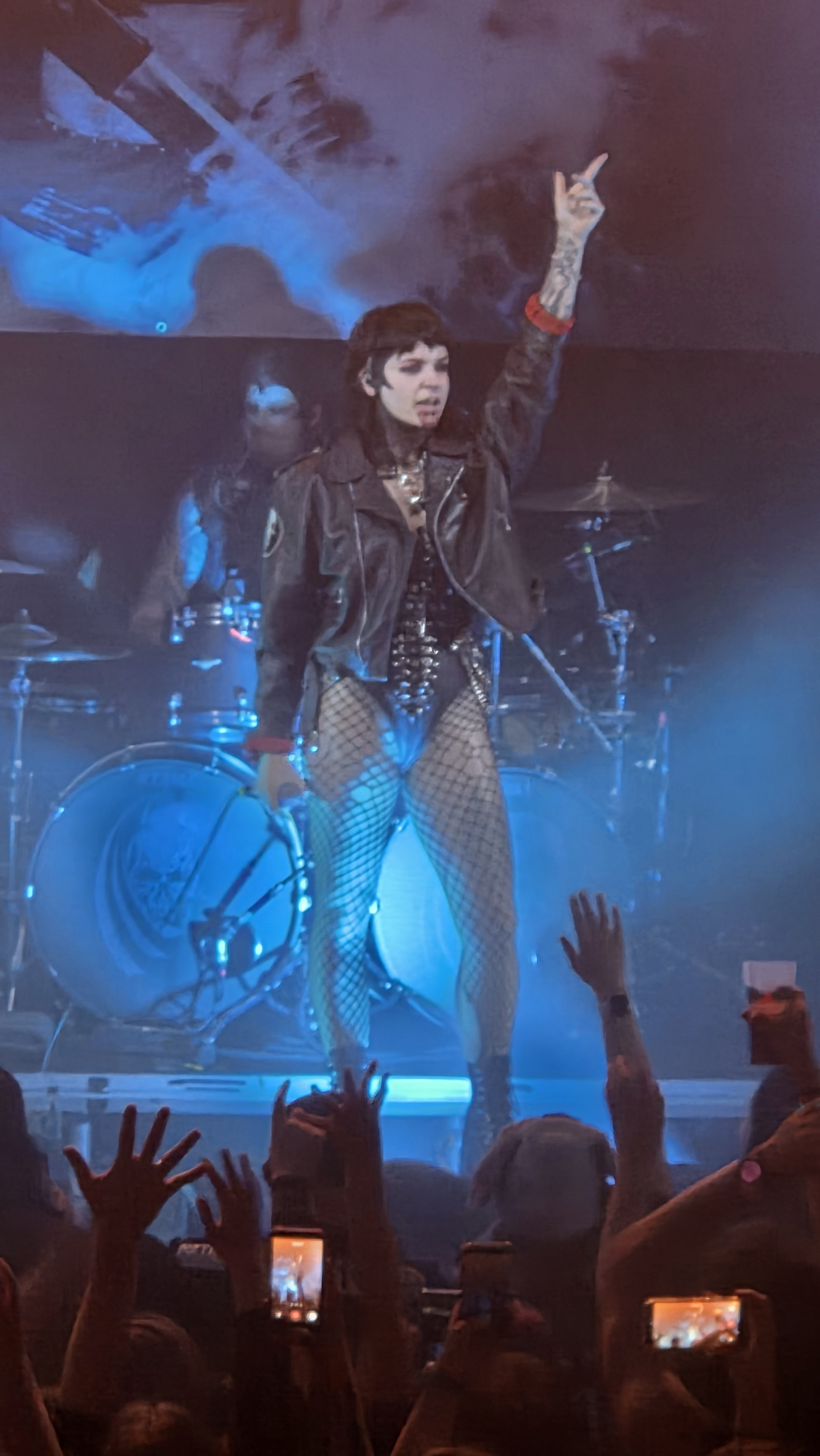
Hannah Greenwood

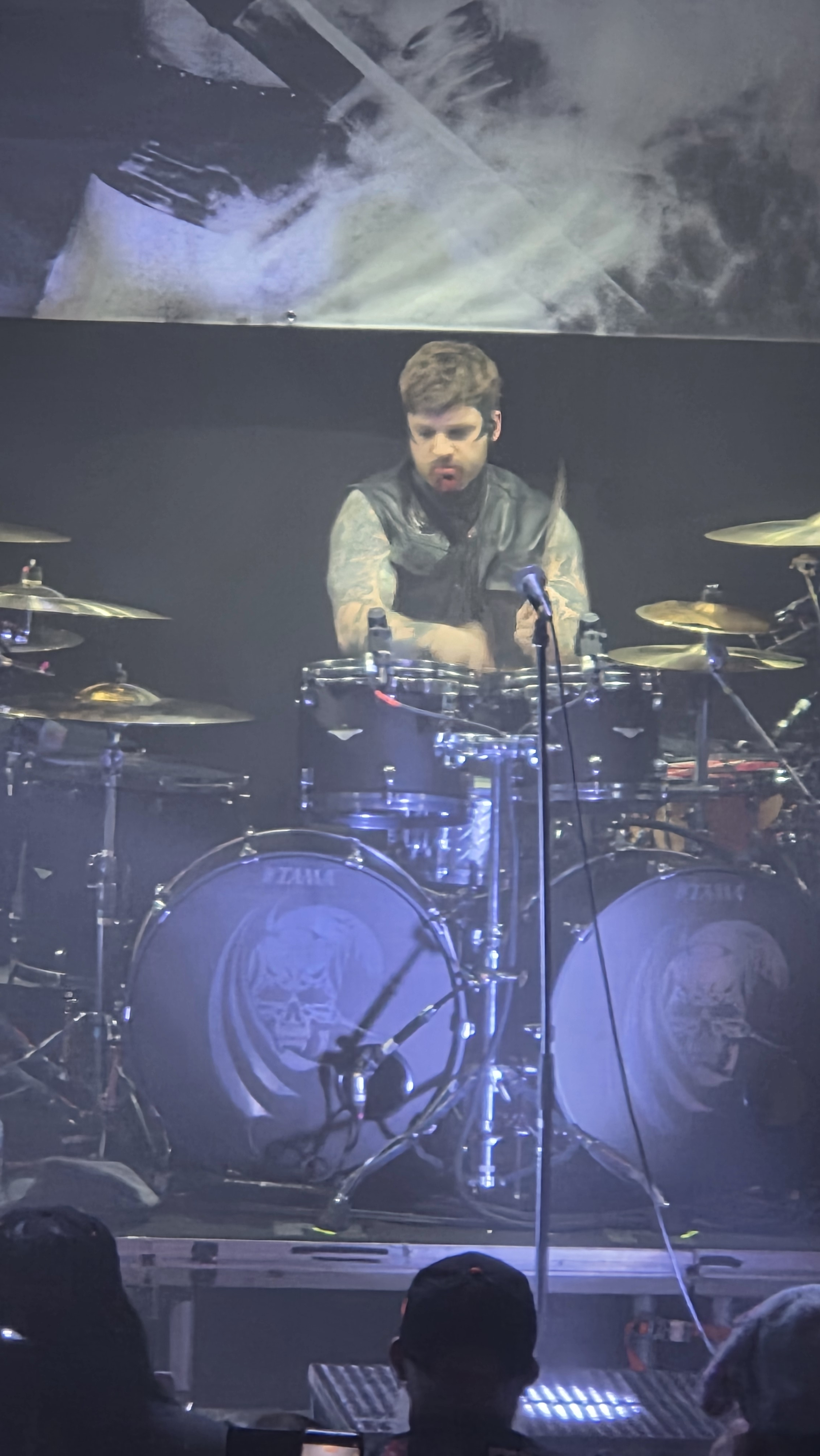
Jake Fogarty

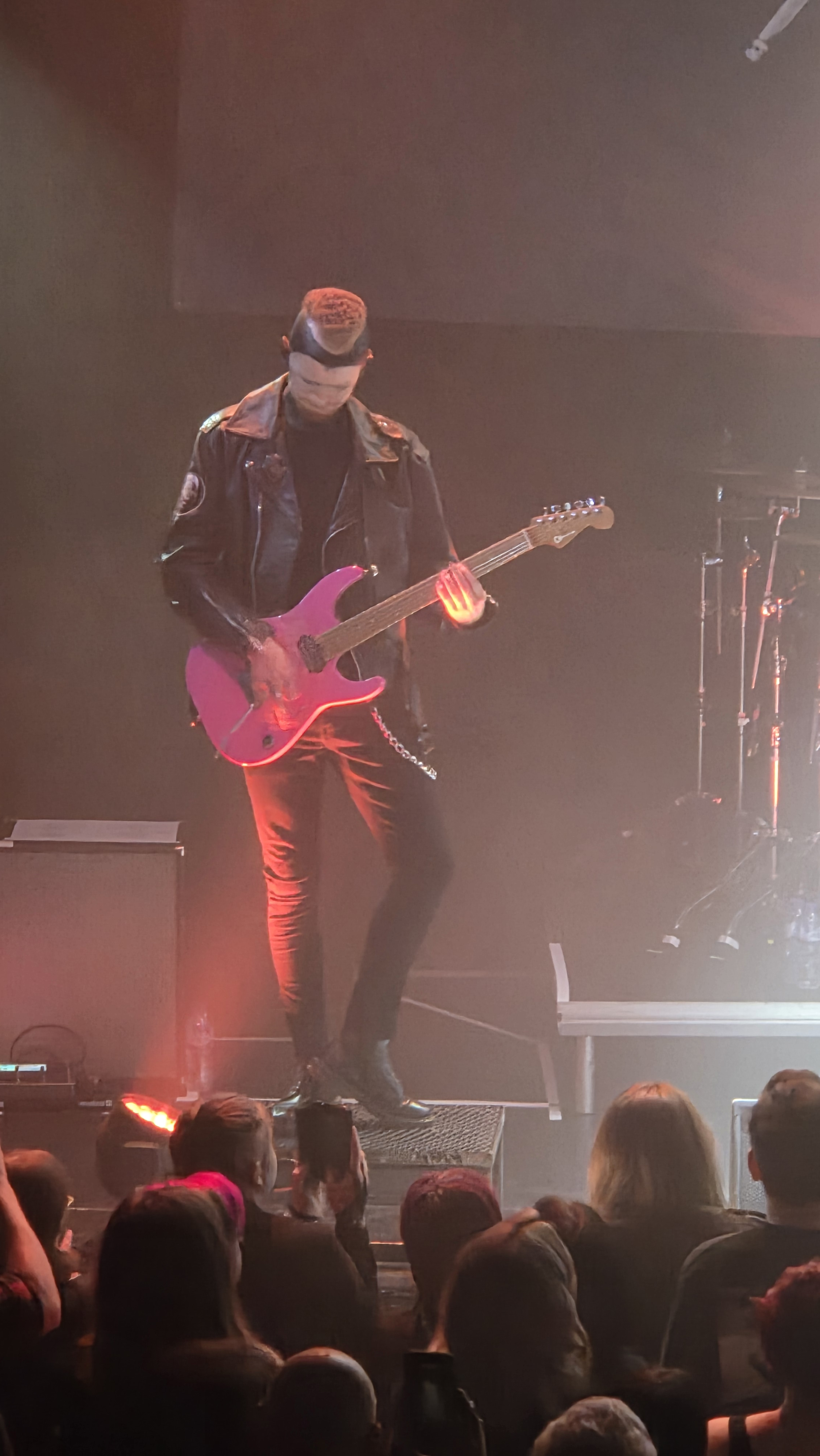
Lawrie Pattison

== Discography ==
Studio albums

- Eternity, in Your Arms (2017)
- Sex, Death & the Infinite Void (2020)
- Sanguivore (2023)
- Sanguivore II: Mistress of Death (2025)

== Awards ==
Alternative Press Music Awards

Year	Recipient/work	Award	Result	Ref.
2016	Creeper	Best Underground Band	Nominated	
2017	Creeper	Breakthrough Band	Nominated	

Heavy Music Awards

Year	Recipient/work	Award	Result	Ref.
2016	Creeper	Best UK Band	Nominated	
2017	Creeper	Best UK Band	Nominated	
2018	Creeper	Best UK Band	Nominated	
2018	Eternity, in Your Arms	Best Album	Nominated	
2018	Eternity, in Your Arms	Best Album Artwork	Nominated	
2020	"Born Cold"	Best Video	Nominated	
2021	Creeper	Best UK Band	Nominated	
2021	Sex, Death & the Infinite Void	Best Album	Nominated	
2021	Sex, Death & the Infinite Void	Best Album Artwork	Nominated	
2021	Sex, Death & the Infinite Void	Best Production	Nominated	
2023	Creeper	Best UK Artist	Nominated	
2023	Creeper	Best UK Live Artist	Nominated	
2023	"Ghost Brigade"	Best Single	Nominated	
2024	Sanguivore	Best Album	Nominated	
2024	Sanguivore	Best Album Artwork	Won	

Kerrang! Awards

Year	Recipient/work	Award	Result	Ref.
2016	Creeper	Best British Newcomer	Won	
2018	Creeper	Best British Live Band	Nominated	

Metal Hammer Golden Gods Awards

Year	Recipient/work	Award	Result	Ref.
2016	Creeper	Best New Band	Won	

Rock Sound Awards

Year	Recipient/work	Award	Result	Ref.
2017	Creeper	Best British Breakthrough	Won	
