= Creeper (EP) =

EP by Creeper
- Released: 19 June 2014
- Recorded: April 2014
- Studios: The Ranch Production House (Southampton, England)
- Genres: Horror punk; punk rock
- Length: 17:28
- Label: Palm Reader (vinyl edition) Roadrunner (2020 Reissue)
- Producer: Neil Kennedy

Creeper chronology
Creeper (2014)	The Callous Heart (2015)

Creeper is the debut extended play (EP) by English rock band Creeper. Recorded in April 2014 at the Ranch Production House in Southampton with producer Neil Kennedy, it was originally released independently as a digital download on 19 June 2014. The EP was later issued on limited edition 12" vinyl by Palm Reader Records in December 2014, followed by another limited edition reissue in November 2020 by Roadrunner Records. "Gloom" and "VCR" were released as music videos.

Written primarily by the band's lead vocalist Will Gould and lead guitarist Ian Miles (with two tracks co-written by rhythm guitarist Sina Nemati), Creeper received positive reviews from music critics. Several commentators praised the release as a strong example of modern punk rock and a promising debut from the band, as well as comparing its sound to that of Alkaline Trio and AFI. Creeper was officially launched at a local show in August 2014, and promoted at more UK shows later in the year.

== Background ==
Creeper recorded their debut EP at The Ranch Production House in their hometown of Southampton with producer and engineer Neil Kennedy. The EP was self-released by the band as a digital download on the website Bandcamp on 19 June 2014, and was later made available for streaming on the Kerrang! website in July. Following its digital release, Creeper was issued as a limited edition 12" vinyl on 8 December 2014 by Palm Reader Records limited to 300 copies – 100 on "Creeper Purple" vinyl and 200 on black vinyl. The EP was written primarily by vocalist Will Gould and guitarist Ian Miles, with second guitarist Sina Nemati co-writing "We Had a Pact" and "Gloom".

In promotion of the EP, a music video for "Gloom" was released on 3 September 2014. The track was also included on the Rock Sound compilation Rock Sound 100% Volume #192 in October. "Gloom" was followed in January 2015 by a video for "VCR", which was filmed "in the heart of [the] Leicestershire countryside". Both videos were produced by Rolling Vision. "VCR" was also later made available as a free download from the Kerrang! website as part of the magazine's #KerrangFreshBlood feature.

After making their live debut at the Creeper EP release show on 1 August 2014 at Southampton's Joiners Arms, the band played their first show in London on 13 September. They later supported Funeral for a Friend on a UK tour in January 2015, as well as opening for Gallows in May and playing at Download Festival in June.

== Critical reception ==
Professional ratings
Review scores
Source	Rating
DIY	4/5 stars
Rock Sound	8/10

Media response to Creeper was generally positive. Tom Connick of DIY magazine described the EP as "perfectly executed punk rock", praising vocalist Will Gould's "impassioned accounts of love and loss" in his lyrics and the "soaring vocal harmonies and three-chord melodies" present on many of the songs, which he compared to the style of bands like Alkaline Trio and AFI. Rock Sound writer Chris Hidden described Creeper as a "highly accomplished debut EP", describing the band's style as "a dark, slightly gothic twist on peppy punk rock" and also comparing them to Alkaline Trio. Katie Clare of Louder Than War remarked that the EP contained "five flawless tracks of dark hued pop punk".

== Track listing ==
No.	Title	Writer(s)	Length
1.	"We Had a Pact"	Will Gould; Ian Miles; Sina Nemati	3:53
2.	"Gloom"	Gould; Miles; Nemati	3:23
3.	"VCR"	Gould; Miles	3:33
4.	"Into the Black"	Gould; Miles	3:10
5.	"Novena"	Gould; Miles	3:29

== Personnel ==
Creeper

- Will Gould – vocals
- Ian Miles – guitar
- Sina Nemati – guitar
- Sean Scott – bass
- Dan Bratton – drums

Additional personnel

- Neil Kennedy – production, engineering
- Alan Douches – mastering
